= List of United Kingdom locations: Is-Ix =

The United Kingdom

This is part of the list of United Kingdom locations: a gazetteer of place names in the United Kingdom showing each place's locality and geographical coordinates.

== Is ==
Location	Locality	Coordinates (links to map & photo sources)	OS grid reference
Isallt Bach	Isle of Anglesey	53.27°N 04.62°W	SH2579
Isauld	Highland	58.56°N 03.77°W	NC9765
Isay	Highland	57.51°N 06.64°W	NG219565
Isbister (Whalsay)	Shetland Islands	60.34°N 00.96°W	HU5763
Isbister (near North Roe, Northmavine)	Shetland Islands	60.59°N 01.32°W	HU3790
Isbister (East Mainland)	Orkney Islands	59.04°N 03.06°W	HY3918
Isbister (West Mainland)	Orkney Islands	59.08°N 03.29°W	HY2623
Isbister Holm	Shetland Islands	60.35°N 00.90°W	HU603642
Isel	Cumbria	54.68°N 03.32°W	NY1533
Isfield	East Sussex	50.93°N 00.06°E	TQ4517
Isham	Northamptonshire	52.34°N 00.70°W	SP8873
Isington	Hampshire	51.17°N 00.89°W	SU7742
Island Carr	North Lincolnshire	53.54°N 00.50°W	SE9906
Island Davaar	Argyll and Bute	55.42°N 05.54°W	NR759201
Island Macaskin	Argyll and Bute	56.13°N 05.56°W	NR789992
Island of Rona	Highland	57.54°N 05.97°W	NG624575
Island of Stroma	Highland	58.68°N 03.12°W	ND349775
Islands Common	Cambridgeshire	52.23°N 00.27°W	TL1861
Islands of Fleet	Dumfries and Galloway	54.82°N 04.22°W	NX571495
Islay	Argyll and Bute	55.76°N 06.23°W	NR348608
Isle Abbotts	Somerset	50.97°N 02.92°W	ST3520
Isle Brewers	Somerset	50.98°N 02.91°W	ST3621
Isleham	Cambridgeshire	52.33°N 00.40°E	TL6474
Isle Martin	Highland	57.94°N 05.22°W	NH093993
Isle of Arran	North Ayrshire	55.58°N 05.23°W	NR960366
Isle of Axholme	North Lincolnshire	53.54°N 00.82°W	SE7806
Isle of Bute	Argyll and Bute	55.84°N 05.10°W	NS056655
Isle of Danna	Argyll and Bute	55.94°N 05.69°W	NR697784
Isle of Dogs	London Borough of Tower Hamlets	51.48°N 00.02°W	TQ3778
Isle of Ewe	Highland	57.83°N 05.61°W	NG852881
Isle of Grain	Kent	51.44°N 00.68°E	TQ868757
Isle of Lewis	Western Isles	58.15°N 06.67°W	NB250282
Isle of Man	Isle of Man	54.25°N 04.47°W	SC386873
Isle of Man	Dumfries and Galloway	55.05°N 03.56°W	NY0075
Isle of May	Fife	56.18°N 02.55°W	NT654990
Isle of Mull	Argyll and Bute	56.42°N 05.88°W	NM603329
Isle of Nibon	Shetland Islands	60.43°N 01.46°W	HU297727
Isle of Noss	Shetland Islands	60.14°N 01.02°W	HU545401
Isle of Portland	Dorset	50.54°N 02.43°W	SY690720
Isle of Purbeck	Dorset	50.63°N 02.03°W	SY974818
Isle of Raasay	Highland	57.41°N 06.05°W	NG568429
Isle of Sheppey	Kent	51.41°N 00.80°E	TQ948717
Isle of Skye	Highland	57.38°N 06.26°W	NG439410
Isle of Stenness	Shetland Islands	60.47°N 01.62°W	HU205764
Isle of Thanet	Kent	51.35°N 01.39°E	TR361676
Isle of West Burrafirth	Shetland Islands	60.31°N 01.55°W	HU248585
Isle of Whithorn	Dumfries and Galloway	54.69°N 04.37°W	NX4736
Isle of Wight	Isle of Wight	50.67°N 01.29°W	SZ496869
Isleornsay	Highland	57.14°N 05.82°W	NG6912
Isle Ristol	Highland	58.04°N 05.43°W	NB971111
Isles of Scilly	Isles of Scilly	49.92°N 06.29°W	SV917119
Islesteps	Dumfries and Galloway	55.03°N 03.62°W	NX9672
Isleworth	Hounslow	51.46°N 00.34°W	TQ1575
Isley Walton	Leicestershire	52.82°N 01.37°W	SK4225
Isley Woodhouse	Leicestershire		SK4225
Islibhig	Western Isles	58.12°N 07.11°W	NA9927
Islington	London Borough of Islington	51.53°N 00.11°W	TQ3184
Islington	Shropshire	52.77°N 02.38°W	SJ7420
Islip	Northamptonshire	52.40°N 00.56°W	SP9879
Islip	Oxfordshire	51.82°N 01.24°W	SP5214
Isombridge	Shropshire	52.71°N 02.57°W	SJ6113
Istead Rise	Kent	51.40°N 00.34°E	TQ6370
Isycoed	Wrexham	53.04°N 02.89°W	SJ4050

== It ==
Location	Locality	Coordinates (links to map & photo sources)	OS grid reference
Itchen	City of Southampton	50.89°N 01.37°W	SU4411
Itchen Abbas	Hampshire	51.08°N 01.24°W	SU5332
Itchen Stoke	Hampshire	51.08°N 01.21°W	SU5532
Itchingfield	West Sussex	51.04°N 00.38°W	TQ1328
Itchington	South Gloucestershire	51.57°N 02.50°W	ST6586
Itteringham	Norfolk	52.82°N 01.17°E	TG1430
Itteringham Common	Norfolk	52.81°N 01.18°E	TG1529
Itton	Monmouthshire	51.65°N 02.73°W	ST4995
Itton Common	Monmouthshire	51.66°N 02.75°W	ST4896

== Iv ==
Location	Locality	Coordinates (links to map & photo sources)	OS grid reference
Ivegill	Cumbria	54.77°N 02.91°W	NY4143
Ivelet	North Yorkshire	54.36°N 02.10°W	SD9397
Iver	Buckinghamshire	51.51°N 00.51°W	TQ0381
Iver Heath	Buckinghamshire	51.53°N 00.53°W	TQ0283
Iverley	Staffordshire	52.42°N 02.19°W	SO8781
Iveston	Durham	54.84°N 01.79°W	NZ1350
Ivinghoe	Buckinghamshire	51.83°N 00.63°W	SP9416
Ivinghoe Aston	Buckinghamshire	51.85°N 00.62°W	SP9518
Ivington	Herefordshire	52.19°N 02.77°W	SO4756
Ivybridge	Devon	50.38°N 03.92°W	SX6356
Ivy Chimneys	Essex	51.68°N 00.09°E	TL4500
Ivychurch	Kent	51.00°N 00.87°E	TR0227
Ivy Cross	Dorset	51.00°N 02.20°W	ST8623
Ivy Hatch	Kent	51.26°N 00.26°E	TQ5854
Ivy Todd	Norfolk	52.64°N 00.79°E	TF8909

== Iw ==
Location	Locality	Coordinates (links to map & photo sources)	OS grid reference
Iwade	Kent	51.37°N 00.71°E	TQ8967
Iwerne Courtney or Shroton	Dorset	50.90°N 02.21°W	ST8512
Iwerne Minster	Dorset	50.92°N 02.20°W	ST8614
Iwood	North Somerset	51.36°N 02.79°W	ST4563

== Ix ==
Location	Locality	Coordinates (links to map & photo sources)	OS grid reference
Ixworth	Suffolk	52.29°N 00.81°E	TL9270
Ixworth Thorpe	Suffolk	52.31°N 00.80°E	TL9172
