= List of United Kingdom locations =

A gazetteer of place names in the United Kingdom showing each place's county, unitary authority or council area and its geographical coordinates.

The United Kingdom

Location names beginning with A

- Location names beginning with Aa–Ak
- Location names beginning with Al
- Location names beginning with Am–Ar
- Location names beginning with As–Az

Location names beginning with B

- Location names beginning with Bab–Bal
- Location names beginning with Bam–Bap
- Location names beginning with Bar
- Location names beginning with Bas–Baz
- Location names beginning with Bea–Bem
- Location names beginning with Ben–Bez
- Location names beginning with Bi
- Location names beginning with Bla–Blac
- Location names beginning with Blad–Bly
- Location names beginning with Boa–Bot
- Location names beginning with Bou–Boz
- Location names beginning with Bra
- Location names beginning with Bre–Bri
- Location names beginning with Bro–Bron
- Location names beginning with Broo–Brt
- Location names beginning with Bru–Bun
- Location names beginning with Bur–Bz

Location names beginning with C

- Location names beginning with Ca–Cap
- Location names beginning with Car–Cd
- Location names beginning with Ce–Chap
- Location names beginning with Char–Che
- Location names beginning with Chi–Ck
- Location names beginning with Cl–Cn
- Location names beginning with Co–Col
- Location names beginning with Com–Cor
- Location names beginning with Cos–Cou
- Location names beginning with Cov–Coy
- Location names beginning with Cra
- Location names beginning with Cre–Croc
- Location names beginning with Croe–Cros
- Location names beginning with Crot–Croz
- Location names beginning with Cru–Cu
- Location names beginning with Cw–Cz

Location names beginning with D

- Location names beginning with Da–Dam
- Location names beginning with Dan–Ddu
- Location names beginning with De–Dee
- Location names beginning with Deo–Dn
- Location names beginning with Do–Dor
- Location names beginning with Dos–Doz
- Location names beginning with Dr
- Location names beginning with Ds–Dz

Location names beginning with E

- Location names beginning with Ea–Eass
- Location names beginning with East A–East D
- Location names beginning with East E–East L
- Location names beginning with East M–East Y
- Location names beginning with Eat–Ee
- Location names beginning with Ef–El
- Location names beginning with Em–Ez

Location names beginning with F

- Location names beginning with Fa–Fe
- Location names beginning with Ff–Fn
- Location names beginning with Fo
- Location names beginning with Fr–Fz

Location names beginning with G

- Location names beginning with Gab–Gan
- Location names beginning with Gao–Gar
- Location names beginning with Gas–Gaz
- Location names beginning with Ge–Gl
- Location names beginning with Gm–Gq
- Location names beginning with Gr–Gred
- Location names beginning with Gree–Gz

Location names beginning with H

- Location names beginning with Ha–Ham
- Location names beginning with Han–Har
- Location names beginning with Has–Hd
- Location names beginning with He–Hem
- Location names beginning with Hen–Hh
- Location names beginning with Hi–Highr
- Location names beginning with Highs–Hn
- Location names beginning with Ho–Hoo
- Location names beginning with Hop–Ht
- Location names beginning with Hu–Hz

Location names beginning with I, J

- Location names beginning with Ia–Im
- Location names beginning with In–Ir
- Location names beginning with Is–Ix
- Location names beginning with J

Location names beginning with K

- Location names beginning with Ka–Key
- Location names beginning with Kib–Kin
- Location names beginning with Kip–Kz

Location names beginning with L

- Location names beginning with La
- Location names beginning with Lea–Lei
- Location names beginning with Lel–Lez
- Location names beginning with Lf–Litm
- Location names beginning with Litn–Liz
- Location names beginning with Llae–Llane
- Location names beginning with Llanf–Llann
- Location names beginning with Llano–Lly
- Location names beginning with Lm–Loi
- Location names beginning with Lol–Lov
- Location names beginning with Low–Loz
- Location names beginning with Lu–Ly

Location names beginning with M

- Location names beginning with Ma–Maq
- Location names beginning with Mar–Md
- Location names beginning with Me–Mic
- Location names beginning with Mid–Mig
- Location names beginning with Milb–Milk
- Location names beginning with Mill
- Location names beginning with Miln–Mix
- Location names beginning with Mo–Mor
- Location names beginning with Mos–Mz

Location names beginning with N

- Location names beginning with Na–Nev
- Location names beginning with New–Newl
- Location names beginning with Newm–Newto
- Location names beginning with Newton
- Location names beginning with New T–Ney
- Location names beginning with Ni–North G
- Location names beginning with North H–Nz

Location names beginning with O

- Location names beginning with Oa–Od
- Location names beginning with Of–Old G
- Location names beginning with Old H–Om
- Location names beginning with On–Oz

Location names beginning with P

- Location names beginning with Pab–Pap
- Location names beginning with Par–Pay
- Location names beginning with Pe–Pen
- Location names beginning with Peo–Pn
- Location names beginning with Po
- Location names beginning with Pr–Pz

Location names beginning with Q

- Location names beginning with Q

Location names beginning with R

- Location names beginning with Ra–Ray
- Location names beginning with Re–Rh
- Location names beginning with Ri–Ror
- Location names beginning with Ros–Rz

Location names beginning with S

- Location names beginning with Saa–Sanc
- Location names beginning with Sand–Say
- Location names beginning with Sb–Sf
- Location names beginning with Sg–Sh
- Location names beginning with Si–Sm
- Location names beginning with Sn–Soute
- Location names beginning with South
- Location names beginning with Sow–Stao
- Location names beginning with Stap–St N
- Location names beginning with Sto–St Q
- Location names beginning with Str–Stt
- Location names beginning with Stu–Sz

Location names beginning with T

- Location names beginning with Ta–Tha
- Location names beginning with The–Thh
- Location names beginning with Thi–Thw
- Location names beginning with Ti
- Location names beginning with To–Tq
- Location names beginning with Tr–Tre
- Location names beginning with Tri–Tz

Location names beginning with U

- Location names beginning with U–Uppen
- Location names beginning with Upper A–Upper H
- Location names beginning with Upper I–Upper W
- Location names beginning with Uppi–Uz

Location names beginning with V

- Location names beginning with V

Location names beginning with W

- Location names beginning with Wa–Wal
- Location names beginning with Wam–Way
- Location names beginning with Wd–West End
- Location names beginning with Weste–West L
- Location names beginning with West M–Wey
- Location names beginning with Wha–Whitc
- Location names beginning with White
- Location names beginning with Whitf–Why
- Location names beginning with Wi–Win
- Location names beginning with Wir–Wood
- Location names beginning with Woof–Wy

Location names beginning with X–Z

- Location names beginning with X–Z

== See also ==
- List of places in England
- Lists of places in Wales
- List of places in Scotland
- List of places in Northern Ireland
- Toponymy in the United Kingdom and Ireland, the study of place names
- List of generic forms in place names in the British Isles
- United Nations Group of Experts on Geographical Names
