= List of United Kingdom locations: Dos-Doz =

The United Kingdom

This is part of the list of United Kingdom locations: a gazetteer of place names in the United Kingdom showing each place's locality and geographical coordinates.

== Do (continued) ==
=== Dos-Doz ===
Location	Locality	Coordinates (links to map & photo sources)	OS grid reference
Doseley	Shropshire	52.65°N 02.48°W	SJ6706
Dosthill	Staffordshire	52.59°N 01.69°W	SK2100
Dothan	Isle of Anglesey	53.23°N 04.44°W	SH3774
Dothill	Shropshire	52.70°N 02.53°W	SJ6412
Dottery	Dorset	50.75°N 02.78°W	SY4595
Doublebois	Cornwall	50.44°N 04.53°W	SX2064
Double Hill	Bath and North East Somerset	51.31°N 02.41°W	ST7157
Doughton	Gloucestershire	51.61°N 02.18°W	ST8791
Doughton	Norfolk	52.82°N 00.77°E	TF8729
Douglas	South Lanarkshire	55.55°N 03.85°W	NS8330
Douglas	Isle of Man	54.14°N 04.48°W	SC3875
Douglas and Angus	City of Dundee	56.47°N 02.91°W	NO4432
Douglastown	Angus	56.61°N 02.96°W	NO4147
Douglas Water	South Lanarkshire	55.60°N 03.79°W	NS8736
Douglas West	South Lanarkshire	55.55°N 03.87°W	NS8231
Doulting	Somerset	51.18°N 02.51°W	ST6443
Dounby	Orkney Islands	59.06°N 03.23°W	HY2920
Doun Chàrlabhaigh / Dùn Chаrlàbhaigh	Western Isles	58.26°N 06.81°W	NB1841
Doune	Highland	57.15°N 03.85°W	NH8809
Doune	Stirling	56.18°N 04.04°W	NN7301
Dounie (Sutherland)	Highland	57.87°N 04.43°W	NH5690
Dounie (Dornoch Firth)	Highland	57.84°N 04.20°W	NH6986
Doura	North Ayrshire	55.64°N 04.63°W	NS3442
Dousland	Devon	50.49°N 04.07°W	SX5368
Dovaston	Shropshire	52.77°N 02.97°W	SJ3420
Dovecot	Knowsley	53.41°N 02.88°W	SJ4191
Dovecothall	East Renfrewshire	55.80°N 04.37°W	NS5159
Dove Green	Nottinghamshire	53.06°N 01.31°W	SK4652
Dove Holes	Derbyshire	53.29°N 01.89°W	SK0778
Dovenby	Cumbria	54.68°N 03.41°W	NY0933
Dovendale	Lincolnshire	53.31°N 00.04°W	TF3082
Dove Point	Wirral	53.40°N 03.15°W	SJ2390
Dover	Kent	51.12°N 01.29°E	TR3141
Dover	Wigan	53.50°N 02.58°W	SD6101
Dovercourt	Essex	51.93°N 01.27°E	TM2531
Doverdale	Worcestershire	52.29°N 02.20°W	SO8666
Doverhay	Somerset	51.20°N 03.60°W	SS8846
Doveridge	Derbyshire	52.90°N 01.83°W	SK1134
Doversgreen	Surrey	51.21°N 00.21°W	TQ2548
Dowanhill	City of Glasgow	55.87°N 04.30°W	NS5667
Dowbridge	Lancashire	53.77°N 02.86°W	SD4331
Dowe Hill	Norfolk	52.68°N 01.69°E	TG5016
Dowlais	Merthyr Tydfil	51.75°N 03.34°W	SO0707
Dowlais Top	Merthyr Tydfil	51.76°N 03.34°W	SO0708
Dowland	Devon	50.87°N 04.04°W	SS5610
Dowles	Worcestershire	52.38°N 02.33°W	SO7776
Dowlesgreen	Berkshire	51.41°N 00.83°W	SU8169
Dowlish Ford	Somerset	50.91°N 02.92°W	ST3513
Dowlish Wake	Somerset	50.90°N 02.89°W	ST3712
Downall Green	St Helens	53.49°N 02.67°W	SD5500
Down Ampney	Gloucestershire	51.67°N 01.85°W	SU1097
Downderry	Cornwall	50.36°N 04.37°W	SX3154
Downe	Bromley	51.33°N 00.05°E	TQ4361
Down End	Somerset	51.16°N 02.98°W	ST3141
Downend	Isle of Wight	50.68°N 01.25°W	SZ5387
Downend	Gloucestershire	51.68°N 02.24°W	ST8398
Downend	City of Bristol	51.49°N 02.51°W	ST6477
Downend	Berkshire	51.47°N 01.32°W	SU4775
Down Field	Cambridgeshire	52.31°N 00.34°E	TL6071
Downfield	City of Dundee	56.48°N 03.00°W	NO3833
Downgate (Linkinhorne)	Cornwall	50.51°N 04.42°W	SX2871
Downgate (Stokeclimsland)	Cornwall	50.52°N 04.31°W	SX3672
Down Hall	Cumbria	54.85°N 03.12°W	NY2852
Downham	Essex	51.62°N 00.48°E	TQ7295
Downham	Lewisham	51.42°N -00.00°E	TQ3971
Downham	Northumberland	55.59°N 02.22°W	NT8633
Downham	Lancashire	53.89°N 02.33°W	SD7844
Downham Market	Norfolk	52.60°N 00.37°E	TF6103
Down Hatherley	Gloucestershire	51.89°N 02.20°W	SO8622
Downhead (West Camel)	Somerset	51.02°N 02.62°W	ST5625
Downhead (Mendip)	Somerset	51.20°N 02.44°W	ST6945
Downhead Park	Milton Keynes	52.05°N 00.74°W	SP8640
Downhill	Cornwall	50.48°N 05.01°W	SW8669
Downhill	Sunderland	54.92°N 01.45°W	NZ3559
Downholland Cross	Sefton	53.54°N 02.96°W	SD3606
Downholme	North Yorkshire	54.36°N 01.83°W	SE1197
Downicary	Devon	50.68°N 04.30°W	SX3790
Downies	Aberdeenshire	57.04°N 02.13°W	NO9295
Downinney	Cornwall	50.68°N 04.54°W	SX2090
Downley	Buckinghamshire	51.64°N 00.78°W	SU8495
Down Park	West Sussex	51.12°N 00.10°W	TQ3338
Downs	The Vale Of Glamorgan	51.45°N 03.28°W	ST1174
Downside	Bedfordshire	51.86°N 00.50°W	TL0320
Downside	East Sussex	50.77°N 00.25°E	TQ5900
Downside	North Somerset	51.38°N 02.73°W	ST4965
Downside	Somerset	51.19°N 02.54°W	ST6244
Downside (near Cobham)	Surrey	51.31°N 00.42°W	TQ1058
Downside (near Leatherhead)	Surrey	51.28°N 00.32°W	TQ1755
Down St Mary	Devon	50.82°N 03.79°W	SS7404
Down Street	East Sussex	50.99°N 00.05°E	TQ4424
Down Thomas	Devon	50.33°N 04.10°W	SX5050
Downton	Wiltshire	50.98°N 01.74°W	SU1821
Downton	Hampshire	50.73°N 01.63°W	SZ2693
Downton	Powys	52.23°N 03.12°W	SO2360
Downton	Shropshire	52.70°N 02.68°W	SJ5412
Dowsby	Lincolnshire	52.84°N 00.35°W	TF1129
Dowsdale	Lincolnshire	52.67°N 00.10°W	TF2810
Dowslands	Somerset	50.99°N 03.09°W	ST2322
Doxey	Staffordshire	52.80°N 02.14°W	SJ9023
Doxford Park	Sunderland	54.86°N 01.42°W	NZ3752
Doynton	South Gloucestershire	51.46°N 02.41°W	ST7174
