= List of United Kingdom locations: Llae-Llane =

The United Kingdom

This is part of the list of United Kingdom locations: a gazetteer of place names in the United Kingdom showing each place's locality and geographical coordinates.

== Llae-Llam ==
Location	Locality	Coordinates (links to map & photo sources)	OS grid reference
Llaingoch	Isle of Anglesey	53.30°N 04.65°W	SH2382
Llaithddu	Powys	52.41°N 03.38°W	SO0680
Llampha	The Vale Of Glamorgan	51.46°N 03.55°W	SS9275

== Llan ==
=== Llana ===
Location	Locality	Coordinates (links to map & photo sources)	OS grid reference
Llanaber	Gwynedd	52.73°N 04.07°W	SH6017
Llanaelhaearn	Gwynedd	52.96°N 04.41°W	SH3844
Llanafan	Ceredigion	52.33°N 03.93°W	SN6872
Llanafan Fawr	Powys	52.18°N 03.52°W	SN9655
Llanallgo	Isle of Anglesey	53.34°N 04.26°W	SH4985
Llanandras	Powys	52.27°N 03.01°W	SO3164
Llananno	Powys	52.35°N 03.33°W	SO0974
Llanarmon	Gwynedd	52.92°N 04.35°W	SH4239
Llanarmon Dyffryn Ceiriog	Wrexham	52.87°N 03.26°W	SJ1532
Llanarmon Mynydd Mawr	Powys	52.83°N 03.29°W	SJ1327
Llanarmon-yn-Ial	Denbighshire	53.09°N 03.21°W	SJ1956
Llanarth	Ceredigion	52.18°N 04.31°W	SN4257
Llanarth	Monmouthshire	51.78°N 02.91°W	SO3710
Llanarthney	Carmarthenshire	51.85°N 04.13°W	SN5320
Llanasa	Flintshire	53.31°N 03.35°W	SJ1081

=== Llanb ===
Location	Locality	Coordinates (links to map & photo sources)	OS grid reference
Llanbabo	Isle of Anglesey	53.34°N 04.45°W	SH3786
Llanbad	Bridgend	51.54°N 03.47°W	SS9884
Llanbadarn Fawr	Ceredigion	52.40°N 04.05°W	SN6080
Llanbadarn Fynydd	Powys	52.39°N 03.33°W	SO0978
Llanbadarn-y-garreg	Powys	52.12°N 03.30°W	SO1148
Llanbadoc	Monmouthshire	51.69°N 02.91°W	SO3700
Llanbadrig	Isle of Anglesey	53.41°N 04.45°W	SH3794
Llanbeder	City of Newport	51.60°N 02.89°W	ST3890
Llanbedr (near Painscastle)	Powys	52.10°N 03.25°W	SO1446
Llanbedr (near Crickhowell)	Powys	51.87°N 03.11°W	SO2320
Llanbedr	Gwynedd	52.81°N 04.10°W	SH5826
Llanbedr-Dyffryn-Clwyd	Denbighshire	53.12°N 03.28°W	SJ1459
Llanbedrgoch	Isle of Anglesey	53.29°N 04.23°W	SH5180
Llanbedrog	Gwynedd	52.85°N 04.49°W	SH3231
Llanbedr-y-cennin	Conwy	53.20°N 03.87°W	SH7569
Llanberis	Gwynedd	53.11°N 04.13°W	SH5760
Llanbethery	The Vale Of Glamorgan	51.41°N 03.39°W	ST0369
Llanbister	Powys	52.34°N 03.32°W	SO1073
Llanblethian	The Vale Of Glamorgan	51.45°N 03.45°W	SS9974
Llanboidy	Carmarthenshire	51.87°N 04.60°W	SN2123
Llanbradach	Caerphilly	51.60°N 03.24°W	ST1490
Llanbrynmair	Powys	52.60°N 03.64°W	SH8902

=== Llanc ===
Location	Locality	Coordinates (links to map & photo sources)	OS grid reference
Llancadle	The Vale Of Glamorgan	51.40°N 03.39°W	ST0368
Llancaiach	Caerphilly	51.65°N 03.28°W	ST1196
Llancarfan	The Vale Of Glamorgan	51.42°N 03.36°W	ST0570
Llancayo	Monmouthshire	51.72°N 02.92°W	SO3603
Llancloudy	Herefordshire	51.87°N 02.74°W	SO4920
Llancowrid	Powys	52.50°N 03.19°W	SO1990
Llancynfelyn	Ceredigion	52.50°N 04.00°W	SN6492

=== Lland ===
Location	Locality	Coordinates (links to map & photo sources)	OS grid reference
Llan-dafal	Caerphilly	51.71°N 03.18°W	SO1803
Llandaff	Cardiff	51.48°N 03.22°W	ST1577
Llandaff North	Cardiff	51.49°N 03.22°W	ST1578
Llandanwg	Gwynedd	52.83°N 04.13°W	SH5628
Llandarcy	Neath Port Talbot	51.63°N 03.86°W	SS7195
Llandawke	Carmarthenshire	51.77°N 04.49°W	SN2811
Llanddaniel Fab	Isle of Anglesey	53.20°N 04.26°W	SH4970
Llanddarog	Carmarthenshire	51.82°N 04.17°W	SN5016
Llanddeiniol	Ceredigion	52.32°N 04.11°W	SN5672
Llanddeiniolen	Gwynedd	53.17°N 04.18°W	SH5466
Llandderfel	Gwynedd	52.92°N 03.51°W	SH9837
Llanddeusant	Isle of Anglesey	53.33°N 04.49°W	SH3485
Llanddew	Powys	51.96°N 03.38°W	SO0530
Llanddewi	Swansea	51.57°N 04.22°W	SS4689
Llanddewi-Brefi	Ceredigion	52.17°N 03.96°W	SN6655
Llanddewi Fach	Monmouthshire	51.65°N 02.96°W	ST3395
Llanddewi'r Cwm	Powys	52.12°N 03.41°W	SO0348
Llanddewi Rhydderch	Monmouthshire	51.81°N 02.95°W	SO3413
Llanddewi Velfrey	Pembrokeshire	51.81°N 04.69°W	SN1416
Llanddewi Ystradenni	Powys	52.30°N 03.32°W	SO1068
Llanddoged	Conwy	53.15°N 03.79°W	SH8063
Llanddona	Isle of Anglesey	53.28°N 04.14°W	SH5779
Llanddowror	Carmarthenshire	51.79°N 04.53°W	SN2514
Llanddulas	Conwy	53.28°N 03.65°W	SH9078
Llanddwywe	Gwynedd	52.77°N 04.10°W	SH5822
Llandecwyn	Gwynedd	52.91°N 04.03°W	SH6337
Llandefaelog Fach / Llandyfaelog Fach	Powys	51.97°N 03.41°W	SO0332
Llandefaelog-tre'r-graig	Powys	51.95°N 03.28°W	SO1229
Llandefalle	Powys	52.00°N 03.31°W	SO1035
Llandegfan	Isle of Anglesey	53.23°N 04.15°W	SH5673
Llandegla	Denbighshire	53.05°N 03.21°W	SJ1952
Llandegley	Powys	52.24°N 03.27°W	SO1362
Llandegveth	Monmouthshire	51.65°N 02.96°W	ST3395
Llandeilo	Carmarthenshire	51.87°N 04.00°W	SN6222
Llandeilo Graban	Powys	52.08°N 03.32°W	SO0944
Llandeilo'r-Fan	Powys	51.99°N 03.61°W	SN8934
Llandeloy	Pembrokeshire	51.89°N 05.12°W	SM8526
Llandenny	Monmouthshire	51.72°N 02.85°W	SO4103
Llandenny Walks	Monmouthshire	51.73°N 02.88°W	SO3904
Llandevaud	City of Newport	51.60°N 02.86°W	ST4090
Llandevenny	City of Newport	51.56°N 02.85°W	ST4186
Llandilo / Llandeilo Llwydarth	Pembrokeshire	51.90°N 04.76°W	SN1027
Llandilo-yr-ynys	Carmarthenshire	51.85°N 04.19°W	SN4920
Llandinam	Powys	52.48°N 03.44°W	SO0288
Llandissilio	Pembrokeshire	51.85°N 04.73°W	SN1221
Llandochau	The Vale Of Glamorgan	51.44°N 03.21°W	ST1673
Llandogo	Monmouthshire	51.73°N 02.69°W	SO5204
Llandough (near Penarth)	The Vale Of Glamorgan	51.44°N 03.21°W	ST1673
Llandough (Llanfair)	The Vale Of Glamorgan	51.43°N 03.45°W	SS9972
Llandovery	Carmarthenshire	51.99°N 03.80°W	SN7634
Llandow	The Vale Of Glamorgan	51.44°N 03.52°W	SS9473
Llandre	Ceredigion	52.45°N 04.03°W	SN6286
Llandrillo	Denbighshire	52.92°N 03.44°W	SJ0337
Llandrillo-yn-Rhos	Conwy	53.30°N 03.75°W	SH8380
Llandrindod	Powys	52.23°N 03.39°W	SO0561
Llandrindod Wells	Powys	52.23°N 03.39°W	SO0561
Llandrinio	Powys	52.74°N 03.06°W	SJ2817
Llandruidion	Pembrokeshire	51.87°N 05.22°W	SM7824
Llandudno	Conwy	53.31°N 03.83°W	SH7881
Llandudno Junction	Conwy	53.28°N 03.81°W	SH7978
Llandwrog	Gwynedd	53.07°N 04.31°W	SH4556
Llandybie	Carmarthenshire	51.81°N 04.01°W	SN6115
Llandyfan	Carmarthenshire	51.83°N 03.97°W	SN6417
Llandyfrïog	Ceredigion	52.04°N 04.43°W	SN3341
Llandyfrydog	Isle of Anglesey	53.33°N 04.34°W	SH4485
Llandygai	Gwynedd	53.20°N 04.11°W	SH5970
Llandygwydd	Ceredigion	52.05°N 04.56°W	SN2443
Llandynan	Denbighshire	52.98°N 03.20°W	SJ1944
Llandyrnog	Denbighshire	53.17°N 03.34°W	SJ1065
Llandysilio	Powys	52.76°N 03.09°W	SJ2619
Llandyssil	Powys	52.54°N 03.19°W	SO1995
Llandysul	Ceredigion	52.03°N 04.31°W	SN4140

=== Llane ===
Location	Locality	Coordinates (links to map & photo sources)	OS grid reference
Llanedeyrn	Cardiff	51.52°N 03.14°W	ST2181
Llaneglwys	Powys	52.03°N 03.37°W	SO0638
Llanegryn	Gwynedd	52.62°N 04.06°W	SH6005
Llanegwad	Carmarthenshire	51.86°N 04.16°W	SN5121
Llaneilian	Isle of Anglesey	53.40°N 04.30°W	SH4792
Llanelian-yn-Rhos	Conwy	53.26°N 03.71°W	SH8676
Llanelidan	Denbighshire	53.04°N 03.34°W	SJ1050
Llanelieu	Powys	51.99°N 03.19°W	SO1834
Llanellen	Monmouthshire	51.78°N 03.01°W	SO3010
Llanelli	Carmarthenshire	51.67°N 04.17°W	SN5000
Llanelltyd	Gwynedd	52.75°N 03.91°W	SH7119
Llanelly	Monmouthshire	51.81°N 03.11°W	SO2314
Llanelly Hill	Monmouthshire	51.79°N 03.13°W	SO2211
Llanelwedd	Powys	52.14°N 03.40°W	SO0451
Llanelwy	Denbighshire	53.25°N 03.45°W	SJ0374
Llanenddwyn	Gwynedd	52.78°N 04.12°W	SH5723
Llanengan	Gwynedd	52.80°N 04.53°W	SH2926
Llanerch	Powys	52.53°N 03.03°W	SO3093
Llanerchemrys	Powys	52.79°N 03.18°W	SJ2023
Llanerchymedd	Isle of Anglesey	53.32°N 04.38°W	SH4184
Llanerfyl	Powys	52.67°N 03.43°W	SJ0309
Llaneuddog	Isle of Anglesey	53.36°N 04.31°W	SH4688
Llan-eurgain	Flintshire	53.20°N 03.13°W	SJ2468
