= List of United Kingdom locations: Gas-Gaz =

The United Kingdom

This is part of the list of United Kingdom locations: a gazetteer of place names in the United Kingdom showing each place's locality and geographical coordinates.

== Ga (continued) ==
=== Gas-Gaz ===
| Location | Locality | Coordinates (links to map & photo sources) | OS grid reference |
|---|---|---|---|
| Gasay | Western Isles | 57.36°N 07.25°W | NF843429 |
| Gasker | Western Isles | 57.98°N 07.29°W | NA873115 |
| Gasper | Wiltshire | 51.09°N 02.34°W | ST7633 |
| Gastard | Wiltshire | 51.41°N 02.17°W | ST8868 |
| Gasthorpe | Suffolk | 52.38°N 00.89°E | TL9780 |
| Gaston Green | Hertfordshire | 51.83°N 00.16°E | TL4917 |
| Gatacre Park | Shropshire | 52.49°N 02.31°W | SO7989 |
| Gatcombe | Isle of Wight | 50.66°N 01.32°W | SZ4885 |
| Gateacre | Liverpool | 53.37°N 02.87°W | SJ4287 |
| Gatebeck | Cumbria | 54.25°N 02.70°W | SD5485 |
| Gateford | Nottinghamshire | 53.32°N 01.14°W | SK5781 |
| Gateforth | North Yorkshire | 53.74°N 01.15°W | SE5628 |
| Gatehead | East Ayrshire | 55.59°N 04.55°W | NS3936 |
| Gate Helmsley | York | 53.98°N 00.94°W | SE6955 |
| Gatehouse of Fleet | Dumfries and Galloway | 54.87°N 04.18°W | NX6056 |
| Gatelawbridge | Dumfries and Galloway | 55.24°N 03.73°W | NX9096 |
| Gateley | Norfolk | 52.77°N 00.90°E | TF9624 |
| Gatenby | North Yorkshire | 54.27°N 01.51°W | SE3287 |
| Gatesgarth | Cumbria | 54.52°N 03.25°W | NY1915 |
| Gateshead | Metropolitan Borough of Gateshead | 54.93°N 01.62°W | NZ2460 |
| Gatesheath | Cheshire | 53.13°N 02.79°W | SJ4760 |
| Gateside | Dumfries and Galloway | 55.23°N 03.40°W | NY1194 |
| Gateside | North Ayrshire | 55.74°N 04.61°W | NS3653 |
| Gateside | Fife | 56.26°N 03.32°W | NO1809 |
| Gateside | Angus | 56.58°N 02.92°W | NO4344 |
| Gateside | East Renfrewshire | 55.79°N 04.42°W | NS4858 |
| Gatewen | Wrexham | 53.05°N 03.03°W | SJ3151 |
| Gatherley | Devon | 50.61°N 04.30°W | SX3782 |
| Gathurst | Wigan | 53.55°N 02.69°W | SD5407 |
| Gatlas | City of Newport | 51.62°N 02.95°W | ST3492 |
| Gatley | Stockport | 53.38°N 02.24°W | SJ8488 |
| Gatley End | Cambridgeshire | 52.05°N 00.11°W | TL2941 |
| Gatton | Surrey | 51.26°N 00.18°W | TQ2753 |
| Gattonside | Scottish Borders | 55.60°N 02.73°W | NT5435 |
| Gatwick | Gloucestershire | 51.81°N 02.39°W | SO7313 |
| Gaufron | Powys | 52.30°N 03.48°W | SN9968 |
| Gaulby | Leicestershire | 52.59°N 00.98°W | SK6900 |
| Gauldry | Fife | 56.39°N 03.02°W | NO3723 |
| Gauntons Bank | Cheshire | 53.01°N 02.65°W | SJ5647 |
| Gaunt's Common | Dorset | 50.84°N 01.97°W | SU0205 |
| Gaunt's Earthcott | South Gloucestershire | 51.55°N 02.53°W | ST6384 |
| Gaunt's End | Essex | 51.90°N 00.23°E | TL5425 |
| Gautby | Lincolnshire | 53.23°N 00.24°W | TF1772 |
| Gavinton | Scottish Borders | 55.76°N 02.38°W | NT7652 |
| Gawber | Barnsley | 53.55°N 01.51°W | SE3207 |
| Gawcott | Buckinghamshire | 51.97°N 01.01°W | SP6831 |
| Gawsworth | Cheshire | 53.21°N 02.16°W | SJ8969 |
| Gawthorpe | Wakefield | 53.69°N 01.59°W | SE2722 |
| Gawthorpe | Kirklees | 53.64°N 01.71°W | SE1916 |
| Gawthrop | Cumbria | 54.27°N 02.47°W | SD6987 |
| Gawthwaite | Cumbria | 54.24°N 03.12°W | SD2784 |
| Gay Bowers | Essex | 51.70°N 00.58°E | TL7904 |
| Gaydon | Warwickshire | 52.18°N 01.47°W | SP3654 |
| Gayhurst | Milton Keynes | 52.10°N 00.77°W | SP8446 |
| Gayle | North Yorkshire | 54.29°N 02.20°W | SD8789 |
| Gayles | North Yorkshire | 54.45°N 01.81°W | NZ1207 |
| Gay Street | West Sussex | 50.96°N 00.46°W | TQ0820 |
| Gayton | Northamptonshire | 52.18°N 00.97°W | SP7054 |
| Gayton | Wirral | 53.31°N 03.09°W | SJ2780 |
| Gayton | Norfolk | 52.74°N 00.54°E | TF7219 |
| Gayton | Staffordshire | 52.84°N 02.03°W | SJ9828 |
| Gayton Engine | Lincolnshire | 53.36°N 00.17°E | TF4588 |
| Gayton le Marsh | Lincolnshire | 53.33°N 00.13°E | TF4284 |
| Gayton le Wold | Lincolnshire | 53.34°N 00.15°W | TF2385 |
| Gayton Thorpe | Norfolk | 52.73°N 00.57°E | TF7418 |
| Gaywood | Norfolk | 52.75°N 00.41°E | TF6320 |
| Gazeley | Suffolk | 52.24°N 00.50°E | TL7164 |
