= List of United Kingdom locations: East M-East Y =

The United Kingdom

This is part of the list of United Kingdom locations: a gazetteer of place names in the United Kingdom showing each place's locality and geographical coordinates.

== East M ==
Location	Locality	Coordinates (links to map & photo sources)	OS grid reference
East Mains	Scottish Borders	55.71°N 02.70°W	NT5647
East Mains	Aberdeenshire	57.06°N 02.54°W	NO6797
East Mains	South Lanarkshire	55.76°N 04.18°W	NS6354
East Mains	Angus	56.52°N 03.09°W	NO3337
East Mains of Burnside	Angus	56.63°N 02.81°W	NO5050
East Malling	Kent	51.28°N 00.43°E	TQ7057
East Malling Heath	Kent	51.26°N 00.42°E	TQ6955
East March	Angus	56.51°N 02.91°W	NO4436
East Marden	West Sussex	50.92°N 00.86°W	SU8014
East Markham	Nottinghamshire	53.24°N 00.89°W	SK7473
East Marsh	North East Lincolnshire	53.57°N 00.08°W	TA2710
East Martin	Hampshire	50.97°N 01.90°W	SU0719
East Marton	North Yorkshire	53.94°N 02.15°W	SD9050
East Melbury	Dorset	50.97°N 02.17°W	ST8820
East Meon	Hampshire	50.99°N 01.03°W	SU6822
East Mere	Devon	50.94°N 03.43°W	SS9917
East Mersea	Essex	51.78°N 00.97°E	TM0514
East Mey	Highland	58.64°N 03.20°W	ND3074
East Molesey	Surrey	51.39°N 00.36°W	TQ1467
East Moor	Wakefield	53.68°N 01.48°W	SE3421
East Moors	Cardiff	51.46°N 03.15°W	ST2075
East Morden	Dorset	50.75°N 02.12°W	SY9195
East Morton	Bradford	53.87°N 01.84°W	SE1042
East Moulsecoomb	Brighton and Hove	50.84°N 00.11°W	TQ3307

== East N ==
Location	Locality	Coordinates (links to map & photo sources)	OS grid reference
East Ness	North Yorkshire	54.19°N 00.94°W	SE6978
East Nevay	Angus	56.58°N 03.09°W	NO3344
East Newton	East Riding of Yorkshire	53.81°N 00.08°W	TA2637
East Newton	North Yorkshire	54.20°N 01.02°W	SE6479
Eastney	City of Portsmouth	50.78°N 01.06°W	SZ6699
Eastnor	Herefordshire	52.03°N 02.39°W	SO7337
East Norton	Leicestershire	52.59°N 00.84°W	SK7800
East Nynehead	Somerset	50.99°N 03.21°W	ST1522

== East O ==
Location	Locality	Coordinates (links to map & photo sources)	OS grid reference
East Oakley	Hampshire	51.24°N 01.18°W	SU5750
Eastoft	North Lincolnshire	53.63°N 00.79°W	SE8016
East Ogwell	Devon	50.51°N 03.65°W	SX8370
Eastoke	Hampshire	50.77°N 00.96°W	SZ7398
Easton (Arthuret)	Cumbria	55.03°N 02.89°W	NY4372
Easton (Bowness)	Cumbria	54.92°N 03.14°W	NY2759
Easton (Bigbury)	Devon	50.30°N 03.86°W	SX6747
Easton (Chagford)	Devon	50.67°N 03.82°W	SX7188
Easton	Somerset	51.22°N 02.70°W	ST5147
Easton	Hampshire	51.08°N 01.27°W	SU5132
Easton	Isle of Wight	50.67°N 01.52°W	SZ3486
Easton	Dorset	50.53°N 02.43°W	SY6971
Easton	Berkshire	51.44°N 01.41°W	SU4172
Easton	Cambridgeshire	52.32°N 00.34°W	TL1371
Easton	Suffolk	52.17°N 01.33°E	TM2858
Easton	City of Bristol	51.46°N 02.56°W	ST6174
Easton	Wiltshire	51.42°N 02.15°W	ST8970
Easton	Norfolk	52.64°N 01.14°E	TG1310
Easton	Lincolnshire	52.82°N 00.63°W	SK9226
Easton Grey	Wiltshire	51.58°N 02.17°W	ST8887
Easton-in-Gordano	North Somerset	51.47°N 02.70°W	ST5175
Easton Maudit	Northamptonshire	52.21°N 00.71°W	SP8858
Easton on the Hill	Northamptonshire	52.62°N 00.52°W	TF0004
Easton Royal	Wiltshire	51.33°N 01.71°W	SU2060
Easton Town	Somerset	51.09°N 02.58°W	ST5933
Easton Town	Wiltshire	51.57°N 02.21°W	ST8586
East Orchard	Dorset	50.95°N 02.24°W	ST8317
East Ord	Northumberland	55.75°N 02.01°W	NT9951
Eastover	Somerset	51.12°N 03.00°W	ST3037

== East P ==
Location	Locality	Coordinates (links to map & photo sources)	OS grid reference
East Panson	Devon	50.70°N 04.32°W	SX3692
East Parley	Dorset	50.77°N 01.85°W	SZ1097
East Peckham	Kent	51.20°N 00.37°E	TQ6648
East Pennard	Somerset	51.13°N 02.58°W	ST5937
East Perry	Cambridgeshire	52.28°N 00.31°W	TL1566
East Portlemouth	Devon	50.22°N 03.76°W	SX7438
East Prawle	Devon	50.21°N 03.71°W	SX7836
East Preston	West Sussex	50.80°N 00.48°W	TQ0702
East Preston	Dumfries and Galloway	54.88°N 03.62°W	NX9656
East Pulham	Dorset	50.87°N 02.39°W	ST7209
East Putford	Devon	50.92°N 04.33°W	SS3616

== East Q ==
Location	Locality	Coordinates (links to map & photo sources)	OS grid reference
East Quantoxhead	Somerset	51.17°N 03.24°W	ST1343

== East R ==
Location	Locality	Coordinates (links to map & photo sources)	OS grid reference
East Rainton	Sunderland	54.81°N 01.48°W	NZ3347
East Ravendale	North East Lincolnshire	53.47°N 00.14°W	TF2399
East Raynham	Norfolk	52.79°N 00.78°E	TF8825
Eastrea	Cambridgeshire	52.55°N 00.09°W	TL2997
Eastriggs	Dumfries and Galloway	54.98°N 03.18°W	NY2466
East Rigton	Leeds	53.88°N 01.45°W	SE3643
Eastrington	East Riding of Yorkshire	53.75°N 00.80°W	SE7929
Eastrip	Wiltshire	51.43°N 02.26°W	ST8271
East Rolstone	North Somerset	51.35°N 02.87°W	ST3962
Eastrop	Hampshire	51.25°N 01.08°W	SU6451
East Rounton	North Yorkshire	54.42°N 01.35°W	NZ4203
East Rudham	Norfolk	52.81°N 00.69°E	TF8228
East Runton	Norfolk	52.93°N 01.25°E	TG1942
East Ruston	Norfolk	52.79°N 01.46°E	TG3427
Eastry	Kent	51.23°N 01.29°E	TR3054

== East S ==
Location	Locality	Coordinates (links to map & photo sources)	OS grid reference
East Saltoun	East Lothian	55.89°N 02.84°W	NT4767
East Scrafton	North Yorkshire	54.26°N 01.86°W	SE0884
East Sheen	Richmond Upon Thames	51.46°N 00.27°W	TQ2075
Eastshore	Shetland Islands	59.88°N 01.30°W	HU3911
East Skelston	Dumfries and Galloway	55.14°N 03.85°W	NX8285
East Sleekburn	Northumberland	55.14°N 01.56°W	NZ2883
East Somerton	Norfolk	52.71°N 01.67°E	TG4819
East Stanley	Durham	54.87°N 01.68°W	NZ2053
East Stockwith	Lincolnshire	53.43°N 00.81°W	SK7994
East Stoke	Dorset	50.67°N 02.18°W	SY8786
East Stoke	Somerset	50.95°N 02.74°W	ST4817
East Stoke	Nottinghamshire	53.03°N 00.88°W	SK7549
East Stour	Dorset	50.99°N 02.30°W	ST7922
East Stour Common	Dorset	51.00°N 02.27°W	ST8123
East Stourmouth	Kent	51.31°N 01.24°E	TR2662
East Stowford	Devon	51.01°N 03.95°W	SS6326
East Stratton	Hampshire	51.14°N 01.22°W	SU5439
East Street	Somerset	51.13°N 02.65°W	ST5438
East Street	Kent	51.27°N 01.29°E	TR3058
East Studdal	Kent	51.19°N 01.31°E	TR3249
East Suisnish	Highland	57.33°N 06.07°W	NG5534

== East T ==
Location	Locality	Coordinates (links to map & photo sources)	OS grid reference
East Taphouse	Cornwall	50.43°N 04.56°W	SX1863
East-the-Water	Devon	51.01°N 04.19°W	SS4626
East Third	Scottish Borders	55.61°N 02.57°W	NT6436
East Thirston	Northumberland	55.28°N 01.70°W	NZ1999
East Tilbury	Essex	51.47°N 00.41°E	TQ6878
East Tisted	Hampshire	51.08°N 01.00°W	SU7032
East Torrington	Lincolnshire	53.33°N 00.28°W	TF1483
East Town (Pilton)	Somerset	51.15°N 02.57°W	ST6040
East Town (Tolland)	Somerset	51.08°N 03.28°W	ST1032
East Town	Wiltshire	51.29°N 02.15°W	ST8955
East Trewent	Pembrokeshire	51.63°N 04.89°W	SS0097
East Tuddenham	Norfolk	52.65°N 01.07°E	TG0811
East Tytherley	Hampshire	51.05°N 01.58°W	SU2928
East Tytherton	Wiltshire	51.46°N 02.05°W	ST9674

== East V ==
Location	Locality	Coordinates (links to map & photo sources)	OS grid reference
East Village	Devon	50.83°N 03.64°W	SS8405
East Village	The Vale of Glamorgan	51.45°N 03.45°W	SS9974
Eastville	City of Bristol	51.47°N 02.56°W	ST6175
Eastville	Lincolnshire	53.08°N 00.08°E	TF4056

== East W ==
Location	Locality	Coordinates (links to map & photo sources)	OS grid reference
East Wall	Shropshire	52.53°N 02.70°W	SO5293
East Walton	Norfolk	52.71°N 00.57°E	TF7416
East Water	Somerset	51.24°N 02.67°W	ST5350
East Week	Devon	50.71°N 03.89°W	SX6692
Eastwell	Leicestershire	52.84°N 00.85°W	SK7728
East Wellow	Hampshire	50.97°N 01.57°W	SU3020
Eastwell Park	Kent	51.18°N 00.87°E	TR0147
East Wemyss	Fife	56.15°N 03.08°W	NT3396
East Whitburn	West Lothian	55.86°N 03.66°W	NS9665
East Whitefield	Perth and Kinross	56.49°N 03.34°W	NO1734
Eastwick	Hertfordshire	51.77°N 00.07°E	TL4311
Eastwick	Shetland Islands	60.49°N 01.34°W	HU3679
East Wickham	Bexley	51.47°N 00.10°E	TQ4677
East Williamston	Pembrokeshire	51.70°N 04.76°W	SN0904
East Winch	Norfolk	52.71°N 00.50°E	TF6916
East Winterslow	Wiltshire	51.09°N 01.65°W	SU2433
East Wittering	West Sussex	50.75°N 00.86°W	SZ8096
East Witton	North Yorkshire	54.26°N 01.78°W	SE1486
Eastwood	Herefordshire	52.05°N 02.55°W	SO6240
Eastwood	Essex	51.56°N 00.65°E	TQ8488
Eastwood	Calderdale	53.72°N 02.06°W	SD9625
Eastwood	Rotherham	53.43°N 01.35°W	SK4393
Eastwood	Nottinghamshire	53.00°N 01.31°W	SK4646
East Woodburn	Northumberland	55.16°N 02.15°W	NY9086
Eastwood End	Cambridgeshire	52.51°N 00.09°E	TL4293
Eastwood Hall	Nottinghamshire	53.01°N 01.31°W	SK4647
East Woodhay	Hampshire	51.34°N 01.42°W	SU4061
East Woodlands	Somerset	51.19°N 02.31°W	ST7844
East Worldham	Hampshire	51.13°N 00.94°W	SU7438
East Worlington	Devon	50.90°N 03.75°W	SS7713
East Worthing	West Sussex	50.81°N 00.35°W	TQ1603
East Wretham	Norfolk	52.47°N 00.81°E	TL9190

== East Y ==
Location	Locality	Coordinates (links to map & photo sources)	OS grid reference
East Youlstone	Cornwall	50.90°N 04.46°W	SS2715
