= List of United Kingdom locations: Cov-Coy =

The United Kingdom

This is part of the list of United Kingdom locations: a gazetteer of place names in the United Kingdom showing each place's locality and geographical coordinates.

== Co (continued) ==
=== Cov ===
Location	Locality	Coordinates (links to map & photo sources)	OS grid reference
Cova	Shetland Islands	60.22°N 01.31°W	HU3849
Cove	Devon	50.96°N 03.49°W	SS9519
Cove	Highland	57.84°N 05.70°W	NG8090
Cove	Hampshire	51.28°N 00.78°W	SU8555
Cove	Argyll and Bute	55.99°N 04.85°W	NS2282
Cove	Scottish Borders	55.93°N 02.36°W	NT7771
Cove Bay	City of Aberdeen	57.10°N 02.08°W	NJ9501
Cove Bottom	Suffolk	52.35°N 01.65°E	TM4979
Covehithe	Suffolk	52.36°N 01.70°E	TM5281
Coven	Staffordshire	52.65°N 02.14°W	SJ9006
Covender	Herefordshire	52.08°N 02.55°W	SO6243
Coveney	Cambridgeshire	52.41°N 00.17°E	TL4882
Covenham St Bartholomew	Lincolnshire	53.42°N -00.00°E	TF3394
Covenham St Mary	Lincolnshire	53.42°N -00.00°E	TF3394
Coven Heath	Staffordshire	52.63°N 02.13°W	SJ9104
Coven Lawn	Staffordshire	52.64°N 02.14°W	SJ9005
Coventry	City of Coventry	52.39°N 01.51°W	SP3378
Coverack	Cornwall	50.02°N 05.10°W	SW7818
Coverack Bridges	Cornwall	50.12°N 05.27°W	SW6630
Coverham	North Yorkshire	54.27°N 01.84°W	SE1086
Covesea	Moray	57.71°N 03.37°W	NJ1870
Covingham	Swindon	51.56°N 01.72°W	SU1985
Covington	Cambridgeshire	52.31°N 00.46°W	TL0570
Covington	South Lanarkshire	55.63°N 03.63°W	NS9739

=== Cow ===
Location	Locality	Coordinates (links to map & photo sources)	OS grid reference
Cowan Bridge	Lancashire	54.17°N 02.56°W	SD6376
Cow Ark	Lancashire	53.90°N 02.50°W	SD6745
Cowbeech	East Sussex	50.90°N 00.28°E	TQ6114
Cowbeech Hill	East Sussex	50.89°N 00.28°E	TQ6113
Cowbit	Lincolnshire	52.74°N 00.13°W	TF2618
Cowbridge	Somerset	51.16°N 03.50°W	SS9542
Cowbridge (Y Bont-Faen)	The Vale of Glamorgan	51.45°N 03.45°W	SS9974
Cowbridge	Lincolnshire	53.00°N 00.03°W	TF3247
Cowcliffe	Kirklees	53.65°N 01.80°W	SE1318
Cowden	East Riding of Yorkshire	53.85°N 00.12°W	TA2340
Cowden	Kent	51.14°N 00.08°E	TQ4640
Cowden	Perth and Kinross	56.35°N 03.99°W	NN7720
Cowdenbeath	Fife	56.10°N 03.35°W	NT1691
Cowan Head	Cumbria	54.36°N 02.78°W	SD4997
Cowers Lane	Derbyshire	53.01°N 01.55°W	SK3046
Cowes	Isle of Wight	50.75°N 01.30°W	SZ4995
Cowesby	North Yorkshire	54.29°N 01.29°W	SE4689
Cowesfield Green	Wiltshire	51.00°N 01.64°W	SU2523
Cowfold	West Sussex	50.98°N 00.27°W	TQ2122
Cowgill	Cumbria	54.27°N 02.38°W	SD7587
Cow Green	Suffolk	52.24°N 01.00°E	TM0565
Cowgrove	Dorset	50.79°N 02.02°W	SY9899
Cowhill	South Gloucestershire	51.61°N 02.57°W	ST6091
Cow Hill	Lancashire	53.80°N 02.65°W	SD5734
Cowhill	Derbyshire	53.01°N 01.47°W	SK3546
Cowhorn Hill	South Gloucestershire	51.43°N 02.47°W	ST6771
Cowie	Aberdeenshire	56.96°N 02.21°W	NO8786
Cowie	Stirling	56.08°N 03.86°W	NS8489
Cowlairs	City of Glasgow	55.87°N 04.23°W	NS6067
Cowlam	East Riding of Yorkshire	54.08°N 00.52°W	SE9665
Cowlands	Cornwall	50.21°N 05.05°W	SW8240
Cowleaze Corner	Oxfordshire	51.71°N 01.56°W	SP3002
Cowley	Devon	50.74°N 03.56°W	SX9095
Cowley	Gloucestershire	51.82°N 02.05°W	SO9614
Cowley	Oxfordshire	51.73°N 01.20°W	SP5504
Cowley	Hillingdon	51.52°N 00.48°W	TQ0582
Cowley	Derbyshire	53.28°N 01.50°W	SK3377
Cowleymoor	Devon	50.90°N 03.48°W	SS9613
Cowley Peachey	Hillingdon	51.51°N 00.48°W	TQ0581
Cowling	Lancashire	53.64°N 02.62°W	SD5917
Cowling (Hambleton)	North Yorkshire	54.27°N 01.64°W	SE2387
Cowling (Craven)	North Yorkshire	53.88°N 02.06°W	SD9643
Cowlinge	Suffolk	52.15°N 00.49°E	TL7154
Cowlow	Derbyshire	53.24°N 01.86°W	SK0972
Cowmes	Kirklees	53.64°N 01.72°W	SE1816
Cowpe	Lancashire	53.67°N 02.25°W	SD8320
Cowpen	Northumberland	55.12°N 01.54°W	NZ2981
Cowpen Bewley	Stockton-on-Tees	54.60°N 01.25°W	NZ4824
Cowplain	Hampshire	50.89°N 01.02°W	SU6911
Cow Roast	Hertfordshire	51.78°N 00.62°W	SP9510
Cowshill	Durham	54.75°N 02.23°W	NY8540
Cowslip Green	North Somerset	51.34°N 02.74°W	ST4861
Cowstrandburn	Fife	56.09°N 03.56°W	NT0390
Cowthorpe	North Yorkshire	53.96°N 01.36°W	SE4252

=== Cox ===
Location	Locality	Coordinates (links to map & photo sources)	OS grid reference
Coxall	Herefordshire	52.36°N 02.92°W	SO3774
Cox Bank or Coxbank	Shropshire	52.96°N 02.52°W	SJ6541
Coxbench	Derbyshire	52.98°N 01.45°W	SK3743
Coxbridge	Somerset	51.12°N 02.65°W	ST5436
Coxford	Cornwall	50.73°N 04.60°W	SX1696
Coxford	City of Southampton	50.92°N 01.44°W	SU3914
Coxford	Norfolk	52.82°N 00.72°E	TF8429
Coxgreen	Shropshire	52.47°N 02.29°W	SO8086
Cox Green	Surrey	51.09°N 00.44°W	TQ0934
Cox Green	Berkshire	51.50°N 00.74°W	SU8779
Cox Green	Bolton	53.62°N 02.43°W	SD7114
Coxheath	Kent	51.23°N 00.49°E	TQ7451
Cox Hill	Cornwall	50.24°N 05.17°W	SW7443
Coxhoe	Durham	54.71°N 01.52°W	NZ3136
Coxley	Somerset	51.18°N 02.67°W	ST5343
Coxley	Wakefield	53.64°N 01.59°W	SE2717
Coxley Wick	Somerset	51.18°N 02.68°W	ST5243
Coxlodge	Newcastle upon Tyne	55.00°N 01.64°W	NZ2368
Cox Moor	Nottinghamshire	53.09°N 01.23°W	SK5156
Coxpark	Cornwall	50.52°N 04.25°W	SX4072
Coxtie Green	Essex	51.63°N 00.25°E	TQ5695
Coxwold	North Yorkshire	54.18°N 01.18°W	SE5377

=== Coy ===
Location	Locality	Coordinates (links to map & photo sources)	OS grid reference
Coychurch	Bridgend	51.49°N 03.54°W	SS9379
Coylton	South Ayrshire	55.43°N 04.51°W	NS4119
Coylumbridge	Highland	57.16°N 03.80°W	NH9110
Coynach	Aberdeenshire	57.13°N 02.92°W	NJ4405
Coytrahen	Bridgend	51.55°N 03.61°W	SS8885
