= List of United Kingdom locations: Ea-Eass =

The United Kingdom

This is part of the list of United Kingdom locations: a gazetteer of place names in the United Kingdom showing each place's locality and geographical coordinates.

== Ea ==
=== Eaa-Eass ===
Location	Locality	Coordinates (links to map & photo sources)	OS grid reference
Eabost	Highland	57.36°N 06.47°W	NG3139
Eabost West	Highland	57.37°N 06.47°W	NG3140
Each End	Kent	51.27°N 01.29°E	TR3058
Eachway	Worcestershire	52.38°N 02.03°W	SO9876
Eachwick	Northumberland	55.03°N 01.82°W	NZ1171
Eagland Hill	Lancashire	53.89°N 02.86°W	SD4345
Eagle	Lincolnshire	53.19°N 00.69°W	SK8767
Eagle Barnsdale	Lincolnshire	53.17°N 00.68°W	SK8865
Eagle Farm	Milton Keynes	52.036°N 0.648°W	SP928384
Eaglescliffe	Stockton-on-Tees	54.52°N 01.35°W	NZ4215
Eaglesfield	Dumfries and Galloway	55.05°N 03.20°W	NY2374
Eaglesfield	Cumbria	54.63°N 03.41°W	NY0928
Eaglesham	East Renfrewshire	55.74°N 04.27°W	NS5752
Eaglestone	Milton Keynes	52.02°N 00.74°W	SP8637
Eaglethorpe	Northamptonshire	52.50°N 00.42°W	TL0791
Eagle Tor	Derbyshire	53.15°N 01.65°W	SK2362
Eagley	Bolton	53.61°N 02.43°W	SD7113
Eairy	Isle of Man	54.16°N 04.62°W	SC2977
Eakring	Nottinghamshire	53.15°N 00.99°W	SK6762
Ealand	North Lincolnshire	53.59°N 00.82°W	SE7811
Ealing	Ealing	51.50°N 00.31°W	TQ1780
Eals	Northumberland	54.88°N 02.51°W	NY6755
Eamont Bridge	Cumbria	54.64°N 02.74°W	NY5228
Earby	Lancashire	53.91°N 02.15°W	SD9046
Earcroft	Lancashire	53.71°N 02.48°W	SD6824
Eardington	Shropshire	52.50°N 02.41°W	SO7290
Eardisland	Herefordshire	52.21°N 02.86°W	SO4158
Eardisley	Herefordshire	52.13°N 03.00°W	SO3149
Eardiston	Shropshire	52.81°N 02.93°W	SJ3725
Eardiston	Worcestershire	52.30°N 02.45°W	SO6968
Earith	Cambridgeshire	52.34°N 00.02°E	TL3874
Earlestown	St Helens	53.45°N 02.66°W	SJ5695
Earley	Berkshire	51.43°N 00.92°W	SU7571
Earlham	Norfolk	52.62°N 01.23°E	TG1908
Earlish	Highland	57.56°N 06.38°W	NG3861
Earls Barton	Northamptonshire	52.25°N 00.75°W	SP8563
Earls Colne	Essex	51.92°N 00.68°E	TL8528
Earls Common	Worcestershire	52.22°N 02.07°W	SO9559
Earl's Court	Hammersmith and Fulham	51.48°N 00.20°W	TQ2578
Earl's Croome	Worcestershire	52.07°N 02.20°W	SO8642
Earlsdon	Coventry	52.39°N 01.54°W	SP3177
Earl's Down	East Sussex	50.94°N 00.33°E	TQ6419
Earlsferry	Fife	56.18°N 02.83°W	NT4899
Earlsfield	Wandsworth	51.44°N 00.18°W	TQ2673
Earlsfield	Lincolnshire	52.90°N 00.66°W	SK9035
Earl's Green	Suffolk	52.25°N 00.97°E	TM0366
Earlsheaton	Kirklees	53.68°N 01.62°W	SE2521
Earl Shilton	Leicestershire	52.56°N 01.32°W	SP4697
Earl Soham	Suffolk	52.22°N 01.26°E	TM2363
Earl Sterndale	Derbyshire	53.20°N 01.86°W	SK0967
Earlston	Scottish Borders	55.63°N 02.68°W	NT5738
Earlston	East Ayrshire	55.58°N 04.54°W	NS4035
Earlstone Common	Hampshire	51.34°N 01.32°W	SU4761
Earl Stonham	Suffolk	52.18°N 01.08°E	TM1158
Earlswood	Surrey	51.22°N 00.16°W	TQ2849
Earlswood	Warwickshire	52.36°N 01.83°W	SP1174
Earlswood	Monmouthshire	51.65°N 02.81°W	ST4495
Earnley	West Sussex	50.75°N 00.85°W	SZ8196
Earnock	South Lanarkshire	55.76°N 04.08°W	NS6954
Earnshaw Bridge	Lancashire	53.69°N 02.71°W	SD5322
Earsary	Western Isles	56.96°N 07.43°W	NL7099
Earsdon	North Tyneside	55.04°N 01.50°W	NZ3272
Earshader	Western Isles	58.19°N 06.83°W	NB1633
Earsham	Norfolk	52.44°N 01.41°E	TM3289
Earsham Street	Suffolk	52.35°N 01.27°E	TM2378
Earswick	York	54.00°N 01.05°W	SE6257
Eartham	West Sussex	50.87°N 00.67°W	SU9309
Earthcott Green	South Gloucestershire	51.56°N 02.50°W	ST6585
Easby (Hambleton)	North Yorkshire	54.46°N 01.12°W	NZ5708
Easby (Richmondshire)	North Yorkshire	54.39°N 01.72°W	NZ1800
Easdale	Argyll and Bute	56.28°N 05.65°W	NM739167
Easebourne	West Sussex	50.99°N 00.73°W	SU8922
Easenhall	Warwickshire	52.40°N 01.32°W	SP4679
Eashing	Surrey	51.17°N 00.65°W	SU9443
Easington	Buckinghamshire	51.78°N 01.01°W	SP6810
Easington	Durham	54.78°N 01.36°W	NZ4143
Easington	East Riding of Yorkshire	53.64°N 00.10°E	TA3919
Easington	Lancashire	53.94°N 02.45°W	SD7050
Easington (Banbury)	Oxfordshire	52.04°N 01.34°W	SP4539
Easington (Watlington)	Oxfordshire	51.66°N 01.04°W	SU6697
Easington	Redcar and Cleveland	54.54°N 00.85°W	NZ7417
Easington Colliery	Durham	54.78°N 01.33°W	NZ4343
Easington Lane	Sunderland	54.80°N 01.44°W	NZ3646
Easingwold	North Yorkshire	54.11°N 01.19°W	SE5369
Eason's Green	East Sussex	50.94°N 00.14°E	TQ5118
Eassie	Angus	56.59°N 03.09°W	NO3345
