= List of United Kingdom locations: Sn-Soute =

The United Kingdom

This is part of the list of United Kingdom locations: a gazetteer of place names in the United Kingdom showing each place's locality and geographical coordinates.

== Sn ==
| Location | Locality | Coordinates (links to map & photo sources) | OS grid reference |
|---|---|---|---|
| Snagshall | East Sussex | 50.98°N 00.53°E | TQ7824 |
| Snailbeach | Shropshire | 52.61°N 02.93°W | SJ3702 |
| Snails Hill | Somerset | 50.91°N 02.76°W | ST4613 |
| Snailswell | Hertfordshire | 51.97°N 00.29°W | TL1732 |
| Snailwell | Cambridgeshire | 52.27°N 00.40°E | TL6467 |
| Snainton | North Yorkshire | 54.22°N 00.59°W | SE9282 |
| Snaisgill | Durham | 54.63°N 02.07°W | NY9527 |
| Snaith | East Riding of Yorkshire | 53.69°N 01.03°W | SE6422 |
| Snape | North Yorkshire | 54.25°N 01.60°W | SE2684 |
| Snape | Suffolk | 52.17°N 01.49°E | TM3959 |
| Snape Green | Lancashire | 53.61°N 02.95°W | SD3714 |
| Snape Hill | Barnsley | 53.53°N 01.38°W | SE4104 |
| Snape Hill | Derbyshire | 53.30°N 01.47°W | SK3579 |
| Snapper | Devon | 51.08°N 04.01°W | SS5934 |
| Snaresbrook | Waltham Forest | 51.58°N 00.00°E | TQ3989 |
| Snarestone | Leicestershire | 52.67°N 01.49°W | SK3409 |
| Snarford | Lincolnshire | 53.32°N 00.42°W | TF0582 |
| Snargate | Kent | 51.01°N 00.82°E | TQ9828 |
| Snatchwood | Torfaen | 51.71°N 03.07°W | SO2602 |
| Snave | Kent | 51.02°N 00.86°E | TR0129 |
| Sneachill | Worcestershire | 52.17°N 02.14°W | SO9053 |
| Snead | Shropshire | 52.52°N 03.01°W | SO3192 |
| Snead Common | Worcestershire | 52.31°N 02.41°W | SO7269 |
| Sneads Green | Worcestershire | 52.30°N 02.20°W | SO8667 |
| Sneath Common | Norfolk | 52.45°N 01.16°E | TM1589 |
| Sneaton | North Yorkshire | 54.45°N 00.62°W | NZ8907 |
| Sneatonthorpe | North Yorkshire | 54.44°N 00.61°W | NZ9006 |
| Snedshill | Shropshire | 52.67°N 02.44°W | SJ7009 |
| Sneinton | Nottinghamshire | 52.94°N 01.13°W | SK5839 |
| Snelland | Lincolnshire | 53.30°N 00.39°W | TF0780 |
| Snelston | Derbyshire | 52.98°N 01.77°W | SK1543 |
| Snetterton | Norfolk | 52.48°N 00.92°E | TL9991 |
| Snettisham | Norfolk | 52.87°N 00.49°E | TF6834 |
| Sneyd Green | City of Stoke-on-Trent | 53.03°N 02.18°W | SJ8849 |
| Sneyd Park | North Somerset | 51.47°N 02.64°W | ST5575 |
| Snibston | Leicestershire | 52.71°N 01.39°W | SK4113 |
| Snig's End | Gloucestershire | 51.95°N 02.30°W | SO7928 |
| Snipeshill | Kent | 51.33°N 00.75°E | TQ9263 |
| Sniseabhal | Western Isles | 57.28°N 07.39°W | NF7534 |
| Snitter | Northumberland | 55.32°N 01.97°W | NU0203 |
| Snitterby | Lincolnshire | 53.43°N 00.52°W | SK9894 |
| Snitterfield | Warwickshire | 52.22°N 01.69°W | SP2159 |
| Snitterton | Derbyshire | 53.13°N 01.59°W | SK2760 |
| Snitton | Shropshire | 52.37°N 02.66°W | SO5575 |
| Snittongate | Shropshire | 52.37°N 02.64°W | SO5675 |
| Snodhill | Herefordshire | 52.05°N 03.00°W | SO3140 |
| Snodland | Kent | 51.32°N 00.43°E | TQ7061 |
| Snods Edge | Northumberland | 54.86°N 01.90°W | NZ0652 |
| Snowden Hill | Barnsley | 53.49°N 01.60°W | SE2600 |
| Snowdown | Kent | 51.21°N 01.20°E | TR2451 |
| Snow End | Hertfordshire | 51.96°N 00.03°E | TL4032 |
| Snow Hill | Cheshire | 53.06°N 02.53°W | SJ6452 |
| Snow Hill | Wakefield | 53.69°N 01.51°W | SE3222 |
| Snow Lea | Kirklees | 53.64°N 01.86°W | SE0917 |
| Snowshill | Gloucestershire | 51.99°N 01.87°W | SP0933 |
| Snow Street | Norfolk | 52.38°N 01.07°E | TM0981 |
| Snydale | Wakefield | 53.67°N 01.39°W | SE4020 |

== So ==
=== Soa–Sot ===
| Location | Locality | Coordinates (links to map & photo sources) | OS grid reference |
|---|---|---|---|
| Soa (tidal island of Tiree) | Argyll and Bute | 56.51°N 06.76°W | NM069458 |
| Soa (near Coll) | Argyll and Bute | 56.56°N 06.63°W | NM156512 |
| Soa Island | Argyll and Bute | 56.28°N 06.45°W | NM243191 |
| Soake | Hampshire | 50.89°N 01.06°W | SU6611 |
| Soar | Devon | 50.21°N 03.82°W | SX7037 |
| Soar | Gwynedd | 52.89°N 04.06°W | SH6135 |
| Soar | Isle of Anglesey | 53.22°N 04.42°W | SH3872 |
| Soar | Powys | 51.97°N 03.50°W | SN9732 |
| Soay | Highland | 57.15°N 06.21°W | NG453146 |
| Soay | Western Isles | 57.82°N 08.63°W | NA064015 |
| Soay Beag | Western Isles | 57.94°N 06.98°W | NB053059 |
| Soay Mòr | Western Isles | 57.93°N 06.96°W | NB061050 |
| Soberton | Hampshire | 50.94°N 01.13°W | SU6116 |
| Soberton Heath | Hampshire | 50.92°N 01.14°W | SU6014 |
| Sockbridge | Cumbria | 54.62°N 02.77°W | NY5026 |
| Sockburn | North Yorkshire | 54.45°N 01.47°W | NZ3407 |
| Sockety | Dorset | 50.85°N 02.74°W | ST4806 |
| Sodom | Denbighshire | 53.22°N 03.36°W | SJ0971 |
| Sodom | Wiltshire | 51.52°N 02.00°W | SU0081 |
| Sodylt Bank | Shropshire | 52.94°N 02.98°W | SJ3439 |
| Soham | Cambridgeshire | 52.33°N 00.33°E | TL5973 |
| Soham Cotes | Cambridgeshire | 52.35°N 00.30°E | TL5775 |
| Soho | Sandwell | 52.49°N 01.95°W | SP0389 |
| Soho | Somerset | 51.23°N 02.44°W | ST6948 |
| Soho | City of Westminster | 51.51°N 00.14°W | TQ2981 |
| Soldon Cross | Devon | 50.86°N 04.38°W | SS3210 |
| Soldridge | Hampshire | 51.10°N 01.07°W | SU6534 |
| Solent Breezes | Hampshire | 50.83°N 01.29°W | SU5004 |
| Sole Street (Ashford) | Kent | 51.20°N 00.99°E | TR0949 |
| Sole Street (Gravesham) | Kent | 51.37°N 00.36°E | TQ6567 |
| Solihull | Warwickshire | 52.40°N 01.78°W | SP1579 |
| Solihull Lodge | Warwickshire | 52.40°N 01.86°W | SP0978 |
| Solitote | Highland | 57.68°N 06.33°W | NG4274 |
| Sollas | Western Isles | 57.64°N 07.34°W | NF8174 |
| Sollers Dilwyn | Herefordshire | 52.19°N 02.84°W | SO4255 |
| Sollers Hope | Herefordshire | 51.99°N 02.56°W | SO6133 |
| Sollom | Lancashire | 53.65°N 02.83°W | SD4518 |
| Solon Mor | Western Isles | 56.82°N 07.61°W | NL577847 |
| Solva | Pembrokeshire | 51.87°N 05.19°W | SM8024 |
| Somerby | Leicestershire | 52.68°N 00.86°W | SK7710 |
| Somerby | Lincolnshire | 53.54°N 00.40°W | TA0606 |
| Somercotes | Derbyshire | 53.07°N 01.37°W | SK4253 |
| Somerdale | Bath and North East Somerset | 51.41°N 02.50°W | ST6569 |
| Somerford | Cheshire | 53.18°N 02.30°W | SJ8065 |
| Somerford | Dorset | 50.73°N 01.76°W | SZ1793 |
| Somerford | Staffordshire | 52.66°N 02.16°W | SJ8908 |
| Somerford Keynes | Gloucestershire | 51.65°N 01.98°W | SU0195 |
| Somerley | West Sussex | 50.77°N 00.85°W | SZ8198 |
| Somerleyton | Suffolk | 52.51°N 01.65°E | TM4897 |
| Somersal Herbert | Derbyshire | 52.91°N 01.80°W | SK1335 |
| Somersby | Lincolnshire | 53.22°N 00.01°E | TF3472 |
| Somersham | Cambridgeshire | 52.38°N 00.00°E | TL3678 |
| Somersham | Suffolk | 52.09°N 01.03°E | TM0848 |
| Somers Town | City of Portsmouth | 50.78°N 01.09°W | SZ6499 |
| Somers Town | City of Westminster | 51.52°N 00.14°W | TQ2982 |
| Somerton | City of Newport | 51.57°N 02.96°W | ST3387 |
| Somerton | Oxfordshire | 51.94°N 01.28°W | SP4928 |
| Somerton | Somerset | 51.04°N 02.74°W | ST4828 |
| Somerton | Suffolk | 52.14°N 00.64°E | TL8153 |
| Somerton Hill | Somerset | 51.04°N 02.77°W | ST4628 |
| Somerwood | Shropshire | 52.72°N 02.65°W | SJ5614 |
| Sompting | West Sussex | 50.82°N 00.34°W | TQ1704 |
| Sompting Abbotts | West Sussex | 50.83°N 00.35°W | TQ1605 |
| Sonning | Berkshire | 51.46°N 00.92°W | SU7575 |
| Sonning Common | Oxfordshire | 51.51°N 00.99°W | SU7080 |
| Sonning Eye | Oxfordshire | 51.47°N 00.92°W | SU7576 |
| Sontley | Wrexham | 53.00°N 03.00°W | SJ3346 |
| Sookholme | Nottinghamshire | 53.18°N 01.19°W | SK5466 |
| Sopley | Hampshire | 50.77°N 01.78°W | SZ1597 |
| Sopwell | Hertfordshire | 51.73°N 00.33°W | TL1505 |
| Sopworth | Wiltshire | 51.57°N 02.26°W | ST8286 |
| Soraigh | Western Isles | 58.27°N 07.59°W | NA722453 |
| Sorbie | Dumfries and Galloway | 54.78°N 04.44°W | NX4346 |
| Sorisdale | Argyll and Bute | 56.67°N 06.45°W | NM2763 |
| Sorley | Devon | 50.30°N 03.79°W | SX7246 |
| Sorn | East Ayrshire | 55.50°N 04.29°W | NS5526 |
| Sornhill | East Ayrshire | 55.57°N 04.36°W | NS5134 |
| Soroba (Oban) | Argyll and Bute | 56.39°N 05.46°W | NM8628 |
| Soroba (Ardfern) | Argyll and Bute | 56.17°N 05.54°W | NM8004 |
| Sortat | Highland | 58.54°N 03.23°W | ND2863 |
| Sotby | Lincolnshire | 53.28°N 00.20°W | TF2078 |
| Sothall | Sheffield | 53.33°N 01.34°W | SK4482 |
| Sots Hole | Lincolnshire | 53.16°N 00.32°W | TF1264 |
| Sotterley | Suffolk | 52.39°N 01.60°E | TM4584 |

=== Sou ===
==== Soua–Soute ====
| Location | Locality | Coordinates (links to map & photo sources) | OS grid reference |
|---|---|---|---|
| Soudley (Eaton-Under-Heywood) | Shropshire | 52.51°N 02.78°W | SO4791 |
| Soudley (Cheswardine) | Shropshire | 52.84°N 02.41°W | SJ7228 |
| Soughley | Barnsley | 53.51°N 01.72°W | SE1802 |
| Soughton | Flintshire | 53.18°N 03.13°W | SJ2466 |
| Soulbury | Buckinghamshire | 51.93°N 00.72°W | SP8827 |
| Soulby (Dacre) | Cumbria | 54.61°N 02.83°W | NY4625 |
| Soulby (Kirkby Stephen) | Cumbria | 54.49°N 02.40°W | NY7411 |
| Souldern | Oxfordshire | 51.97°N 01.24°W | SP5231 |
| Souldrop | Bedfordshire | 52.23°N 00.56°W | SP9861 |
| Sound | Cheshire | 53.02°N 02.56°W | SJ6248 |
| Sound (Lerwick) | Shetland Islands | 60.14°N 01.17°W | HU4640 |
| Sound (Weisdale) | Shetland Islands | 60.23°N 01.31°W | HU3850 |
| Sound (Yell) | Shetland Islands | 60.52°N 01.18°W | HU4583 |
| Sound Gruney | Shetland Islands | 60.64°N 00.94°W | HU576960 |
| Sound Heath | Cheshire | 53.01°N 02.58°W | SJ6147 |
| Soundwell | South Gloucestershire | 51.47°N 02.50°W | ST6575 |
| Sourhope | Scottish Borders | 55.47°N 02.25°W | NT8420 |
| Sourin | Orkney Islands | 59.16°N 02.99°W | HY4331 |
| Sourlie | North Ayrshire | 55.63°N 04.63°W | NS3441 |
| Sour Nook | Cumbria | 54.75°N 02.98°W | NY3740 |
| Sourton | Devon | 50.69°N 04.08°W | SX5390 |
| Soutergate | Cumbria | 54.21°N 03.19°W | SD2281 |
