= List of United Kingdom locations: Deo-Dn =

The United Kingdom

This is part of the list of United Kingdom locations: a gazetteer of place names in the United Kingdom showing each place's locality and geographical coordinates.

== De (continued) ==
=== Deo-Dew ===
Location	Locality	Coordinates (links to map & photo sources)	OS grid reference
Deopham	Norfolk	52.55°N 01.02°E	TG0500
Deopham Green	Norfolk	52.55°N 01.00°E	TM0499
Deopham Stalland	Norfolk	52.55°N 00.99°E	TM0399
Depden	Suffolk	52.18°N 00.58°E	TL7757
Depden Green	Suffolk	52.18°N 00.58°E	TL7757
Deppers Bridge	Warwickshire	52.22°N 01.43°W	SP3959
Deptford	Lewisham	51.47°N 00.04°W	TQ3677
Deptford	Sunderland	54.90°N 01.40°W	NZ3857
Deptford	Wiltshire	51.14°N 01.98°W	SU0138
Derby	Devon	51.07°N 04.05°W	SS5633
Derby	City of Derby	52.91°N 01.48°W	SK3535
Derbyhaven	Isle of Man	54.07°N 04.63°W	SC2867
Derbyshire Hill	St Helens	53.44°N 02.69°W	SJ5494
Deri	Caerphilly	51.70°N 03.27°W	SO1201
Derriford	Devon	50.41°N 04.12°W	SX4959
Derril	Devon	50.80°N 04.41°W	SS3003
Derringstone	Kent	51.19°N 01.14°E	TR2049
Derrington	Shropshire	52.50°N 02.59°W	SO6090
Derrington	Staffordshire	52.79°N 02.16°W	SJ8922
Derriton	Devon	50.80°N 04.37°W	SS3303
Derry	Co. Londonderry	54.99°N 07.32°W	C435168
Derry Downs	Bromley	51.38°N 00.11°E	TQ4767
Derry Fields	Wiltshire	51.63°N 01.94°W	SU0493
Derry Hill	Wiltshire	51.42°N 02.07°W	ST9570
Derrythorpe	North Lincolnshire	53.56°N 00.76°W	SE8208
Dersingham	Norfolk	52.84°N 00.49°E	TF6830
Dertfords	Wiltshire	51.20°N 02.27°W	ST8145
Dervaig	Argyll and Bute	56.58°N 06.18°W	NM4352
Derwen	Bridgend	51.52°N 03.57°W	SS9182
Derwen	Denbighshire	53.03°N 03.40°W	SJ0650
Derwenlas	Powys	52.57°N 03.89°W	SN7299
Desborough	Northamptonshire	52.43°N 00.82°W	SP8083
Desford	Leicestershire	52.62°N 01.30°W	SK4703
Detchant	Northumberland	55.61°N 01.87°W	NU0836
Detling	Kent	51.29°N 00.56°E	TQ7958
Deuchar	Angus	56.74°N 02.88°W	NO4662
Deuxhill	Shropshire	52.48°N 02.45°W	SO6987
Devauden	Monmouthshire	51.67°N 02.75°W	ST4898
Deveral	Cornwall	50.16°N 05.37°W	SW5935
Devil's Bridge / Pontarfynach	Ceredigion	52.36°N 03.86°W	SN7376
Devitts Green	Warwickshire	52.50°N 01.60°W	SP2790
Devizes	Wiltshire	51.34°N 02.00°W	SU0061
Devol	Inverclyde	55.92°N 04.69°W	NS3273
Devonport	Devon	50.37°N 04.18°W	SX4555
Devonside	Clackmannan	56.14°N 03.73°W	NS9296
Devon Village	Clackmannan	56.13°N 03.77°W	NS9095
Devoran	Cornwall	50.20°N 05.09°W	SW7939
Dewartown	Midlothian	55.86°N 03.00°W	NT3764
Dewes Green	Hertfordshire	51.94°N 00.10°E	TL4530
Dewlands Common	Dorset	50.87°N 01.90°W	SU0708
Dewlish	Dorset	50.78°N 02.32°W	SY7798
Dewsbury	Kirklees	53.69°N 01.63°W	SE2422
Dewsbury Moor	Kirklees	53.69°N 01.66°W	SE2222

== Dh ==
Location	Locality	Coordinates (links to map & photo sources)	OS grid reference
Dhoon	Isle of Man	54.24°N 04.38°W	SC4586
Dhoor	Isle of Man	54.33°N 04.40°W	SC4496
Dhustone	Shropshire	52.38°N 02.61°W	SO5876

== Di ==
Location	Locality	Coordinates (links to map & photo sources)	OS grid reference
Dial Green	West Sussex	51.03°N 00.68°W	SU9227
Dial Post	West Sussex	50.95°N 00.36°W	TQ1519
Dibberford	Dorset	50.82°N 02.78°W	ST4503
Dibden	Hampshire	50.87°N 01.43°W	SU4008
Dibden Purlieu	Hampshire	50.85°N 01.41°W	SU4106
Dickens Heath	Solihull	52.38°N 01.85°W	SP1076
Dickleburgh	Norfolk	52.39°N 01.17°E	TM1682
Dickleburgh Moor	Norfolk	52.40°N 01.18°E	TM1783
Dickon Hills	Lincolnshire	53.08°N 00.13°E	TF4356
Didbrook	Gloucestershire	51.97°N 01.92°W	SP0531
Didcot	Oxfordshire	51.59°N 01.25°W	SU5289
Diddington	Cambridgeshire	52.27°N 00.25°W	TL1965
Diddlebury	Shropshire	52.46°N 02.73°W	SO5085
Diddywell	Devon	51.03°N 04.21°W	SS4529
Didley	Herefordshire	51.98°N 02.80°W	SO4532
Didling	West Sussex	50.95°N 00.81°W	SU8318
Didlington	Norfolk	52.54°N 00.60°E	TL7797
Didmarton	Gloucestershire	51.58°N 02.26°W	ST8287
Didsbury	Manchester	53.41°N 02.24°W	SJ8491
Didworthy	Devon	50.44°N 03.86°W	SX6862
Digbeth	Birmingham	52.47°N 01.89°W	SP0786
Digby	Lincolnshire	53.07°N 00.38°W	TF0854
Digg	Highland	57.63°N 06.25°W	NG4669
Diggle	Oldham	53.56°N 02.00°W	SE0008
Diglis	Worcestershire	52.17°N 02.23°W	SO8453
Digmoor	Lancashire	53.53°N 02.77°W	SD4904
Digswell	Hertfordshire	51.81°N 00.18°W	TL2515
Digswell Park	Hertfordshire	51.81°N 00.21°W	TL2314
Digswell Water	Hertfordshire	51.81°N 00.18°W	TL2514
Dihewyd	Ceredigion	52.17°N 04.22°W	SN4855
Dilham	Norfolk	52.77°N 01.45°E	TG3325
Dilhorne	Staffordshire	52.98°N 02.04°W	SJ9743
Dill Hall	Lancashire	53.75°N 02.39°W	SD7429
Dillington	Somerset	50.93°N 02.89°W	ST3715
Dillington	Cambridgeshire	52.27°N 00.34°W	TL1365
Dilston	Northumberland	54.96°N 02.04°W	NY9763
Dilton Marsh	Wiltshire	51.24°N 02.23°W	ST8449
Dilwyn	Herefordshire	52.18°N 02.86°W	SO4154
Dimlands	The Vale Of Glamorgan	51.40°N 03.51°W	SS9568
Dimmer	Somerset	51.07°N 02.55°W	ST6131
Dimple	Lancashire	53.63°N 02.45°W	SD7015
Dimple	Derbyshire	53.13°N 01.58°W	SK2860
Dimsdale	Staffordshire	53.02°N 02.24°W	SJ8448
Dimson	Cornwall	50.51°N 04.23°W	SX4271
Dinas	Cornwall	50.52°N 04.95°W	SW9174
Dinas	Carmarthenshire	51.94°N 04.51°W	SN2730
Dinas (Llŷn Peninsula)	Gwynedd	52.89°N 04.58°W	SH2636
Dinas (Criccieth)	Gwynedd	52.90°N 04.24°W	SH4937
Dinas (Bontnewydd)	Gwynedd	53.09°N 04.27°W	SH4858
Dinas Cross	Pembrokeshire	52.01°N 04.91°W	SN0039
Dinas Dinlle	Gwynedd	53.07°N 04.34°W	SH4356
Dinas Head	Pembrokeshire	52.03°N 04.90°W	SN008409
Dinas-Mawddwy	Gwynedd	52.71°N 03.70°W	SH8514
Dinas Mawr	Conwy	53.06°N 03.79°W	SH8053
Dinas Powis	The Vale Of Glamorgan	51.43°N 03.22°W	ST1571
Dinbych / Denbigh	Denbighshire	53.18°N 03.42°W	SJ0566
Dinbych-y-pysgod / Tenby	Pembrokeshire	51.66°N 04.70°W	SN1300
Dinckley	Lancashire	53.81°N 02.48°W	SD6835
Dinder	Somerset	51.19°N 02.61°W	ST5744
Dinedor	Herefordshire	52.02°N 02.68°W	SO5336
Dinedor Cross	Herefordshire	52.01°N 02.70°W	SO5235
Dines Green	Worcestershire	52.19°N 02.26°W	SO8255
Dingestow	Monmouthshire	51.78°N 02.79°W	SO4510
Dinghurst	North Somerset	51.32°N 02.80°W	ST4459
Dingle	Liverpool	53.37°N 02.96°W	SJ3687
Dingleden	Kent	51.05°N 00.58°E	TQ8131
Dingleton	Scottish Borders	55.58°N 02.73°W	NT5433
Dingley	Northamptonshire	52.47°N 00.86°W	SP7787
Dingwall	Highland	57.58°N 04.44°W	NH5458
Dinlabyre	Scottish Borders	55.22°N 02.75°W	NY5292
Dinmael	Conwy	52.98°N 03.49°W	SJ0044
Dinnet	Aberdeenshire	57.07°N 02.90°W	NO4598
Dinnington	Somerset	50.90°N 02.85°W	ST4012
Dinnington	Newcastle upon Tyne	55.05°N 01.68°W	NZ2073
Dinnington	Rotherham	53.35°N 01.22°W	SK5285
Dinorwig	Gwynedd	53.12°N 04.10°W	SH5961
Dinton	Wiltshire	51.07°N 01.98°W	SU0131
Dinton	Buckinghamshire	51.78°N 00.89°W	SP7610
Dinworthy	Devon	50.90°N 04.40°W	SS3115
Dipford	Somerset	50.98°N 03.14°W	ST2021
Dipley	Hampshire	51.30°N 00.93°W	SU7457
Dippen	Argyll and Bute	55.58°N 05.49°W	NR798375
Dippen	North Ayrshire	55.45°N 05.10°W	NS0422
Dippenhall	Surrey	51.20°N 00.84°W	SU8146
Dippertown	Devon	50.63°N 04.23°W	SX4284
Dippin Head	North Ayrshire	55.45°N 05.09°W	NS047223
Dipple	Devon	50.92°N 04.36°W	SS3417
Dipple	South Ayrshire	55.27°N 04.83°W	NS2002
Diptford	Devon	50.39°N 03.80°W	SX7256
Dipton	Durham	54.87°N 01.76°W	NZ1553
Diptonmill	Northumberland	54.93°N 02.12°W	NY9260
Direcleit	Western Isles	57.88°N 06.81°W	NG1598
Dirleton	East Lothian	56.03°N 02.78°W	NT5183
Dirnanean	Perth and Kinross	56.74°N 03.53°W	NO0663
Dirt Pot	Northumberland	54.80°N 02.23°W	NY8546
Discoed	Powys	52.26°N 03.07°W	SO2764
Discove	Somerset	51.09°N 02.44°W	ST6933
Diseworth	Leicestershire	52.81°N 01.33°W	SK4524
Dishes	Orkney Islands	59.09°N 02.61°W	HY6523
Dishforth	North Yorkshire	54.15°N 01.41°W	SE3873
Dishley	Leicestershire	52.78°N 01.24°W	SK5121
Disley	Cheshire	53.35°N 02.04°W	SJ9784
Diss	Norfolk	52.37°N 01.09°E	TM1180
Disserth	Powys	52.21°N 03.42°W	SO0358
Distington	Cumbria	54.59°N 03.54°W	NY0023
Ditchampton	Wiltshire	51.07°N 01.88°W	SU0831
Ditcheat	Somerset	51.12°N 02.54°W	ST6236
Ditchfield	Buckinghamshire	51.61°N 00.84°W	SU8091
Ditchingham	Norfolk	52.46°N 01.42°E	TM3391
Ditchling	East Sussex	50.91°N 00.12°W	TQ3215
Ditherington	Shropshire	52.72°N 02.74°W	SJ5014
Ditteridge	Wiltshire	51.41°N 02.27°W	ST8169
Dittisham	Devon	50.37°N 03.60°W	SX8654
Ditton	Kent	51.28°N 00.45°E	TQ7157
Ditton	Cheshire	53.35°N 02.78°W	SJ4885
Ditton Green	Cambridgeshire	52.19°N 00.42°E	TL6658
Ditton Priors	Shropshire	52.49°N 02.59°W	SO6089
Dittons	East Sussex	50.81°N 00.27°E	TQ6004
Dixton	Gloucestershire	51.96°N 02.03°W	SO9830
Dizzard	Cornwall	50.75°N 04.61°W	SX1698
Dizzard Point	Cornwall	50.75°N 04.60°W	SX165988
