= List of United Kingdom locations: Ia-Im =

The United Kingdom

This is part of the list of United Kingdom locations: a gazetteer of place names in the United Kingdom showing each place's locality and geographical coordinates.

== Ia ==
Location	Locality	Coordinates (links to map & photo sources)	OS grid reference
Ianstown	Moray	57.68°N 02.95°W	NJ4366

== Ib ==
Location	Locality	Coordinates (links to map & photo sources)	OS grid reference
Ibberton	Dorset	50.86°N 02.31°W	ST7807
Ible	Derbyshire	53.11°N 01.64°W	SK2457
Ibrox	City of Glasgow	55.84°N 04.31°W	NS5564
Ibsley	Hampshire	50.88°N 01.78°W	SU1509
Ibstock	Leicestershire	52.68°N 01.40°W	SK4010
Ibstone	Buckinghamshire	51.63°N 00.91°W	SU7593
Ibthorpe	Hampshire	51.27°N 01.47°W	SU3753
Ibworth	Hampshire	51.28°N 01.19°W	SU5654

== Ic ==
Location	Locality	Coordinates (links to map & photo sources)	OS grid reference
Icelton	North Somerset	51.38°N 02.90°W	ST3765
Ichrachan	Argyll and Bute	56.42°N 05.22°W	NN0130
Ickburgh	Norfolk	52.51°N 00.66°E	TL8194
Ickenham	Hillingdon	51.55°N 00.45°W	TQ0785
Ickenthwaite	Cumbria	54.29°N 03.04°W	SD3289
Ickford	Buckinghamshire	51.75°N 01.07°W	SP6407
Ickham	Kent	51.27°N 01.18°E	TR2258
Ickleford	Hertfordshire	51.96°N 00.28°W	TL1831
Icklesham	East Sussex	50.91°N 00.65°E	TQ8716
Ickleton	Cambridgeshire	52.06°N 00.17°E	TL4943
Icklingham	Suffolk	52.31°N 00.59°E	TL7772
Ickornshaw	North Yorkshire	53.87°N 02.06°W	SD9642
Ickwell	Bedfordshire	52.09°N 00.32°W	TL1545
Ickwell Green	Bedfordshire	52.09°N 00.32°W	TL1545
Icomb	Gloucestershire	51.89°N 01.69°W	SP2122
Icy Park	Devon	50.30°N 03.84°W	SX6947

== Id ==
Location	Locality	Coordinates (links to map & photo sources)	OS grid reference
Idbury	Oxfordshire	51.86°N 01.66°W	SP2319
Iddesleigh	Devon	50.85°N 04.04°W	SS5608
Ide	Devon	50.69°N 03.57°W	SX8990
Ideford	Devon	50.58°N 03.56°W	SX8977
Ide Hill	Kent	51.23°N 00.11°E	TQ4851
Iden	East Sussex	50.97°N 00.71°E	TQ9123
Iden Green (near Goudhurst)	Kent	51.10°N 00.48°E	TQ7437
Iden Green (near Benenden)	Kent	51.05°N 00.56°E	TQ8031
Idle	Bradford	53.82°N 01.74°W	SE1737
Idle Moor	Bradford	53.82°N 01.75°W	SE1637
Idless	Cornwall	50.28°N 05.06°W	SW8247
Idlicote	Warwickshire	52.09°N 01.59°W	SP2844
Idmiston	Wiltshire	51.13°N 01.72°W	SU1937
Idoch	Aberdeenshire	57.53°N 02.38°W	NJ775494
Idole	Carmarthenshire	51.81°N 04.29°W	SN4215
Idridgehay	Derbyshire	53.03°N 01.58°W	SK2849
Idridgehay Green	Derbyshire	53.03°N 01.58°W	SK2849
Idrigill	Highland	57.58°N 06.38°W	NG3863
Idstone	Oxfordshire	51.55°N 01.64°W	SU2584

== Ie ==
Location	Locality	Coordinates (links to map & photo sources)	OS grid reference
Iet-y-bwlch	Carmarthenshire	51.92°N 04.67°W	SN1628

== If ==
Location	Locality	Coordinates (links to map & photo sources)	OS grid reference
Iffley	Oxfordshire	51.72°N 01.24°W	SP5203
Ifield	West Sussex	51.11°N 00.21°W	TQ2537
Ifield Green	West Sussex	51.12°N 00.21°W	TQ2538
Ifieldwood	West Sussex	51.12°N 00.24°W	TQ2338
Ifold	West Sussex	51.06°N 00.54°W	TQ0231
Iford	East Sussex	50.84°N 00.01°W	TQ4007
Iford	Bournemouth	50.73°N 01.81°W	SZ1393
Ifton Heath	Shropshire	52.92°N 02.99°W	SJ3337

== Ig ==
Location	Locality	Coordinates (links to map & photo sources)	OS grid reference
Ightfield	Shropshire	52.93°N 02.61°W	SJ5938
Ightfield Heath	Shropshire	52.92°N 02.61°W	SJ5937
Ightham	Kent	51.28°N 00.27°E	TQ5956
Ightham Common	Kent	51.27°N 00.26°E	TQ5855

== Ik ==
Location	Locality	Coordinates (links to map & photo sources)	OS grid reference
Iken	Suffolk	52.14°N 01.52°E	TM4155

== Il ==
Location	Locality	Coordinates (links to map & photo sources)	OS grid reference
Ilam	Staffordshire	53.04°N 01.80°W	SK1350
Ilchester	Somerset	50.99°N 02.68°W	ST5222
Ilchester Mead	Somerset	50.99°N 02.69°W	ST5122
Ilderton	Northumberland	55.48°N 01.98°W	NU0121
Ileden	Kent	51.22°N 01.14°E	TR2052
Ilford	Somerset	50.94°N 02.91°W	ST3617
Ilford	Redbridge	51.55°N 00.07°E	TQ4486
Ilfracombe	Devon	51.20°N 04.13°W	SS5147
Ilkeston	Derbyshire	52.97°N 01.31°W	SK4642
Ilketshall St Andrew	Suffolk	52.42°N 01.49°E	TM3887
Ilketshall St Lawrence	Suffolk	52.39°N 01.49°E	TM3883
Ilketshall St Margaret	Suffolk	52.41°N 01.45°E	TM3585
Ilkley	Bradford	53.91°N 01.83°W	SE1147
Illand	Cornwall	50.57°N 04.43°W	SX2878
Illeray	Western Isles	57.54°N 07.38°W	NF7863
Illey	Worcestershire	52.42°N 02.03°W	SO9881
Illidge Green	Cheshire	53.16°N 02.31°W	SJ7963
Illington	Norfolk	52.46°N 00.85°E	TL9489
Illingworth	Calderdale	53.74°N 01.89°W	SE0728
Illogan	Cornwall	50.25°N 05.27°W	SW6744
Illogan Highway	Cornwall	50.22°N 05.26°W	SW6741
Illshaw Heath	Warwickshire	52.36°N 01.81°W	SP1374
Illston on the Hill	Leicestershire	52.58°N 00.96°W	SP7099
Ilmer	Buckinghamshire	51.73°N 00.90°W	SP7605
Ilmington	Warwickshire	52.08°N 01.69°W	SP2143
Ilminster	Somerset	50.92°N 02.91°W	ST3614
Ilsington	Devon	50.57°N 03.72°W	SX7876
Ilston	Swansea	51.59°N 04.09°W	SS5590
Ilton	Somerset	50.94°N 02.92°W	ST3517
Ilton	North Yorkshire	54.19°N 01.72°W	SE1878

== Im ==
Location	Locality	Coordinates (links to map & photo sources)	OS grid reference
Imachar	North Ayrshire	55.60°N 05.39°W	NR8640
Imber	Wiltshire	51.23°N 02.05°W	ST9648
Imeraval	Argyll and Bute	55.62°N 06.21°W	NR3545
Immingham	North East Lincolnshire	53.60°N 00.21°W	TA1814
Impington	Cambridgeshire	52.24°N 00.10°E	TL4463
