= List of United Kingdom locations: Saa-Sanc =

The United Kingdom

This is part of the list of United Kingdom locations: a gazetteer of place names in the United Kingdom showing each place's locality and geographical coordinates.

== Saa–Sak ==
Location	Locality	Coordinates (links to map & photo sources)	OS grid reference
Saasaig	Highland	57.10°N 05.86°W	NG6608
Sabden	Lancashire	53.82°N 02.35°W	SD7737
Sabine's Green	Essex	51.64°N 00.22°E	TQ5496
Sabiston	Orkney Islands	59.07°N 03.24°W	HY2921
Sackers Green	Suffolk	52.01°N 00.76°E	TL9039
Sacombe	Hertfordshire	51.85°N 00.07°W	TL3319
Sacombe Green	Hertfordshire	51.85°N 00.05°W	TL3419
Sacquoy Head	Orkney Islands	59.19°N 03.07°W	HY385350
Sacriston	Durham	54.81°N 01.62°W	NZ2447
Sadberge	Darlington	54.54°N 01.47°W	NZ3417
Saddell	Argyll and Bute	55.53°N 05.51°W	NR7832
Saddington	Leicestershire	52.51°N 01.04°W	SP6591
Saddle Bow	Norfolk	52.70°N 00.36°E	TF6015
Saddlescombe	West Sussex	50.88°N 00.19°W	TQ2711
Saddle Street	Dorset	50.82°N 02.88°W	ST3803
Sadgill	Cumbria	54.43°N 02.80°W	NY4805
Saffron's Cross	Herefordshire	52.15°N 02.67°W	SO5451
Saffron Walden	Essex	52.01°N 00.24°E	TL5438
Sageston	Pembrokeshire	51.69°N 04.82°W	SN0503
Saham Hills	Norfolk	52.59°N 00.80°E	TF9003
Saham Toney	Norfolk	52.58°N 00.78°E	TF8902
Saighton	Cheshire	53.15°N 02.83°W	SJ4462
Saintbridge	Gloucestershire	51.84°N 02.21°W	SO8516
Saintbury	Gloucestershire	52.04°N 01.84°W	SP1139
Saint Hill	Devon	50.86°N 03.29°W	ST0908
Saint Hill Green	West Sussex	51.10°N 0.01°W	TQ383357
Saint's Hill	Kent	51.14°N 00.17°E	TQ5241
Saith ffynnon	Flintshire	53.28°N 03.27°W	SJ1577

== Sal–Sam ==
Location	Locality	Coordinates (links to map & photo sources)	OS grid reference
Salcombe	Devon	50.23°N 03.78°W	SX7339
Salcombe Regis	Devon	50.68°N 03.21°W	SY1488
Salcott	Essex	51.78°N 00.81°E	TL9413
Salden	Buckinghamshire	51.95°N 00.80°W	SP8229
Sale	Trafford	53.41°N 02.33°W	SJ7891
Saleby	Lincolnshire	53.27°N 00.17°E	TF4578
Sale Green	Worcestershire	52.21°N 02.10°W	SO9357
Salehurst	East Sussex	50.98°N 00.47°E	TQ7424
Salem	Cornwall	50.25°N 05.17°W	SW7444
Salem	Ceredigion	52.43°N 03.97°W	SN6684
Salem	Carmarthenshire	51.91°N 04.00°W	SN6226
Salen	Argyll and Bute	56.51°N 05.95°W	NM5743
Salen	Highland	56.71°N 05.79°W	NM6864
Salendine Nook	Kirklees	53.64°N 01.85°W	SE1017
Salenside	Scottish Borders	55.47°N 02.85°W	NT4620
Salesbury	Lancashire	53.78°N 02.50°W	SD6732
Saleway	Worcestershire	52.22°N 02.11°W	SO9259
Salford	Bedfordshire	52.04°N 00.64°W	SP9339
Salford	Oxfordshire	51.95°N 01.59°W	SP2828
Salford	Greater Manchester	53.47°N 02.30°W	SJ8098
Salford Ford	Milton Keynes	52.03°N 00.64°W	SP9338
Salford Priors	Warwickshire	52.15°N 01.89°W	SP0751
Salfords	Surrey	51.19°N 00.16°W	TQ2846
Salhouse	Norfolk	52.67°N 01.40°E	TG3014
Saline	Fife	56.11°N 03.57°W	NT0292
Salisbury	Wiltshire	51.06°N 01.80°W	SU1430
Salkeld Dykes	Cumbria	54.71°N 02.71°W	NY5436
Sallachy	Highland	57.31°N 05.47°W	NG9130
Salle	Norfolk	52.78°N 01.11°E	TG1025
Salmans	Kent	51.16°N 00.15°E	TQ5143
Salmonby	Lincolnshire	53.23°N 00.02°W	TF3273
Salmonhutch	Devon	50.76°N 03.67°W	SX8298
Salperton	Gloucestershire	51.87°N 01.89°W	SP0720
Salperton Park	Gloucestershire	51.86°N 01.89°W	SP0719
Salph End	Bedfordshire	52.15°N 00.43°W	TL0752
Salsburgh	North Lanarkshire	55.83°N 03.88°W	NS8262
Salt	Staffordshire	52.84°N 02.07°W	SJ9527
Salta	Cumbria	54.79°N 03.43°W	NY0845
Saltaire	Bradford	53.82°N 01.80°W	SE1337
Saltash	Cornwall	50.40°N 04.22°W	SX4258
Saltburn	Highland	57.69°N 04.14°W	NH7269
Saltburn-by-the-Sea	Redcar and Cleveland	54.58°N 00.98°W	NZ6621
Saltby	Leicestershire	52.82°N 00.73°W	SK8526
Salt Coates	Cumbria	54.86°N 03.27°W	NY1853
Saltcoats	North Ayrshire	55.63°N 04.79°W	NS2441
Saltcoats	Cumbria	54.35°N 03.43°W	SD0796
Saltcoats	East Lothian	56.02°N 02.83°W	NT4882
Saltcotes	Lancashire	53.74°N 02.95°W	SD3728
Saltdean	Brighton and Hove	50.80°N 00.04°W	TQ3802
Salt End	East Riding of Yorkshire	53.73°N 00.24°W	TA1628
Salterbeck	Cumbria	54.61°N 03.56°W	NX9926
Salterforth	Lancashire	53.90°N 02.18°W	SD8845
Salters Heath	Hampshire	51.30°N 01.12°W	SU6157
Saltershill	Shropshire	52.84°N 02.53°W	SJ6428
Salters Lode	Norfolk	52.58°N 00.33°E	TF5801
Salter Street	Warwickshire	52.36°N 01.82°W	SP1274
Salterswall	Cheshire	53.19°N 02.57°W	SJ6267
Salterton	Wiltshire	51.11°N 01.82°W	SU1235
Saltfleet	Lincolnshire	53.41°N 00.18°E	TF4593
Saltfleetby All Saints	Lincolnshire	53.38°N 00.17°E	TF4590
Saltfleetby St Clement	Lincolnshire	53.39°N 00.17°E	TF4591
Saltfleetby St Peter	Lincolnshire	53.37°N 00.14°E	TF4389
Saltford	Bath and North East Somerset	51.40°N 02.46°W	ST6867
Salt Hill	Berkshire	51.51°N 00.61°W	SU9680
Salthouse	Cumbria	54.11°N 03.22°W	SD2069
Salthouse	Norfolk	52.94°N 01.07°E	TG0743
Saltley	Birmingham	52.48°N 01.86°W	SP0987
Saltmarsh	City of Newport	51.53°N 02.93°W	ST3582
Saltmarshe	East Riding of Yorkshire	53.70°N 00.81°W	SE7824
Saltness	Orkney Islands	58.79°N 03.26°W	ND2790
Saltney	Flintshire	53.16°N 02.94°W	SJ3764
Salton	North Yorkshire	54.21°N 00.91°W	SE7180
Saltrens	Devon	50.96°N 04.20°W	SS4521
Saltwell	Gateshead	54.94°N 01.61°W	NZ2561
Saltwick	Northumberland	55.11°N 01.73°W	NZ1780
Saltwood	Kent	51.07°N 01.06°E	TR1535
Salum	Argyll and Bute	56.54°N 06.77°W	NM0648
Salvington	West Sussex	50.83°N 00.39°W	TQ1305
Salwarpe	Worcestershire	52.24°N 02.19°W	SO8761
Salway Ash	Dorset	50.76°N 02.78°W	SY4596
Sambourne	Wiltshire	51.19°N 02.20°W	ST8644
Sambourne	Warwickshire	52.24°N 01.92°W	SP0561
Sambrook	Shropshire	52.81°N 02.43°W	SJ7124
Samhla	Western Isles	57.53°N 07.36°W	NF7962
Samlesbury	Lancashire	53.76°N 02.62°W	SD5930
Samlesbury Bottoms	Lancashire	53.74°N 02.59°W	SD6128
Sampford Arundel	Somerset	50.95°N 03.28°W	ST1018
Sampford Brett	Somerset	51.15°N 03.31°W	ST0840
Sampford Chapple	Devon	50.79°N 03.95°W	SS6201
Sampford Courtenay	Devon	50.79°N 03.94°W	SS6301
Sampford Moor	Somerset	50.94°N 03.26°W	ST1117
Sampford Peverell	Devon	50.91°N 03.38°W	ST0314
Sampford Spiney	Devon	50.52°N 04.07°W	SX5372
Samphrey	Shetland Islands	60.46°N 01.15°W	HU464762
Samson	Isles of Scilly	49.93°N 06.34°W	SV880127
Samuel's Corner	Essex	51.54°N 00.81°E	TQ9587
Samuelston	East Lothian	55.92°N 02.83°W	NT4870

== San ==
=== Sana–Sanc ===
Location	Locality	Coordinates (links to map & photo sources)	OS grid reference
Sanachan	Highland	57.39°N 05.61°W	NG8340
Sancreed	Cornwall	50.10°N 05.62°W	SW4129
Sancton	East Riding of Yorkshire	53.83°N 00.63°W	SE9039
