= List of United Kingdom locations: Dan-Ddu =

The United Kingdom

This is part of the list of United Kingdom locations: a gazetteer of place names in the United Kingdom showing each place's locality and geographical coordinates.

== Da (continued) ==
=== Dan-Dap ===
Location	Locality	Coordinates (links to map & photo sources)	OS grid reference
Danaway	Kent	51.32°N 00.66°E	TQ8662
Danbury	Essex	51.71°N 00.56°E	TL7705
Danbury Common	Essex	51.70°N 00.57°E	TL7804
Danby	North Yorkshire	54.46°N 00.92°W	NZ7008
Danby Wiske	North Yorkshire	54.37°N 01.49°W	SE3398
Dan Caerlan	Rhondda, Cynon, Taff	51.53°N 03.37°W	ST0583
Dancers Hill	Hertfordshire	51.67°N 00.22°W	TQ2399
Dancing Green	Herefordshire	51.87°N 02.53°W	SO6320
Danderhall	City of Edinburgh	55.90°N 03.12°W	NT3069
Dandy Corner	Suffolk	52.26°N 01.03°E	TM0767
Danebank	Cheshire	53.35°N 02.04°W	SJ9784
Dane Bank	Tameside	53.45°N 02.15°W	SJ9095
Danebridge	Cheshire	53.18°N 02.06°W	SJ9665
Dane End	Hertfordshire	51.87°N 00.06°W	TL3321
Danegate	East Sussex	51.07°N 00.22°E	TQ5633
Danehill	East Sussex	51.02°N -00.00°E	TQ4027
Dane in Shaw	Cheshire	53.14°N 02.19°W	SJ8761
Danemoor Green	Norfolk	52.60°N 01.02°E	TG0505
Danesbury	Hertfordshire	51.82°N 00.21°W	TL2316
Danesfield	Buckinghamshire	51.54°N 00.83°W	SU8184
Danesford	Shropshire	52.51°N 02.41°W	SO7291
Daneshill	Hampshire	51.27°N 01.06°W	SU6553
Danesmoor	Derbyshire	53.16°N 01.40°W	SK4063
Danes Moss	Cheshire	53.22°N 02.15°W	SJ9070
Dane Street	Kent	51.23°N 00.93°E	TR0553
Daneway	Gloucestershire	51.72°N 02.08°W	SO9403
Dangerous Corner	Wigan	53.52°N 02.52°W	SD6503
Dangerous Corner	Lancashire	53.58°N 02.72°W	SD5210
Daniel's Water	Kent	51.13°N 00.78°E	TQ9541
Dannonchapel	Cornwall	50.60°N 04.78°W	SX0382
Danthorpe	East Riding of Yorkshire	53.77°N 00.11°W	TA2432
Danygraig	Caerphilly	51.60°N 03.11°W	ST2390
Danzey Green	Warwickshire	52.31°N 01.82°W	SP1269
Dapple Heath	Staffordshire	52.83°N 01.94°W	SK0426

=== Dar-Das ===
Location	Locality	Coordinates (links to map & photo sources)	OS grid reference
Darby End	Dudley	52.48°N 02.07°W	SO9587
Darby Green	Hampshire	51.33°N 00.80°W	SU8360
Darbys Green	Worcestershire	52.20°N 02.38°W	SO7456
Darby's Hill	Sandwell	52.49°N 02.06°W	SO9689
Darcy Lever	Bolton	53.56°N 02.40°W	SD7308
Dardy	Powys	51.85°N 03.16°W	SO2018
Darenth	Kent	51.41°N 00.24°E	TQ5671
Daresbury	Cheshire	53.33°N 02.64°W	SJ5782
Daresbury Delph	Cheshire	53.33°N 02.64°W	SJ5782
Darfield	Barnsley	53.53°N 01.38°W	SE4104
Darfoulds	Derbyshire	53.29°N 01.17°W	SK5578
Dargate	Kent	51.31°N 00.96°E	TR0761
Dargate Common	Kent	51.31°N 00.98°E	TR0861
Dargill	Perth and Kinross	56.35°N 03.84°W	NN8619
Darite	Cornwall	50.49°N 04.46°W	SX2569
Darkland	Moray	57.64°N 03.24°W	NJ2662
Darland	Wrexham	53.10°N 02.94°W	SJ3757
Darlaston	Walsall	52.57°N 02.04°W	SO9797
Darlaston Green	Walsall	52.57°N 02.04°W	SO9797
Darley	Shropshire	52.58°N 02.47°W	SO6899
Darley	North Yorkshire	54.02°N 01.69°W	SE2059
Darley Abbey	City of Derby	52.93°N 01.48°W	SK3538
Darley Bridge	Derbyshire	53.14°N 01.61°W	SK2661
Darley Dale	Derbyshire	53.16°N 01.61°W	SK2663
Darleyford	Cornwall	50.53°N 04.44°W	SX2773
Darley Green	Warwickshire	52.36°N 01.73°W	SP1874
Darleyhall	Hertfordshire	51.88°N 00.34°W	TL1422
Darley Head	North Yorkshire	54.02°N 01.71°W	SE1959
Darley Hillside	Derbyshire	53.16°N 01.59°W	SK2763
Darlingscott	Warwickshire	52.07°N 01.66°W	SP2342
Darlington	County Durham	54.52°N 01.56°W	NZ2814
Darliston	Shropshire	52.89°N 02.62°W	SJ5833
Darlton	Nottinghamshire	53.24°N 00.84°W	SK7773
Darmsden	Suffolk	52.13°N 01.05°E	TM0953
Darnall	Sheffield	53.38°N 01.41°W	SK3988
Darnford	Staffordshire	52.66°N 01.80°W	SK1308
Darnhall Mains	Scottish Borders	55.72°N 03.21°W	NT2448
Darnhill or Darn Hill	Rochdale	53.58°N 02.25°W	SD8310
Darnick	Scottish Borders	55.59°N 02.74°W	NT5334
Darowen	Powys	52.59°N 03.74°W	SH8201
Darracott	Devon	51.12°N 04.18°W	SS4739
Darracott	Cornwall	50.92°N 04.52°W	SS2317
Darras Hall	Northumberland	55.03°N 01.76°W	NZ1571
Darrington	Wakefield	53.67°N 01.27°W	SE4820
Darrow Green	Norfolk	52.45°N 01.31°E	TM2589
Darsham	Suffolk	52.26°N 01.53°E	TM4169
Darshill	Somerset	51.18°N 02.57°W	ST6043
Dartford	Kent	51.43°N 00.18°E	TQ5273
Dartington	Devon	50.44°N 03.70°W	SX7962
Dartmeet	Devon	50.54°N 03.87°W	SX6773
Dartmouth	Devon	50.34°N 03.58°W	SX8751
Dartmouth Park	Camden	51.55°N 00.15°W	TQ2886
Darton	Barnsley	53.58°N 01.51°W	SE3210
Darvel	East Ayrshire	55.60°N 04.28°W	NS5637
Darvillshill	Buckinghamshire	51.68°N 00.81°W	SU8299
Darwell Hole	East Sussex	50.94°N 00.40°E	TQ6919
Darwen	Lancashire	53.69°N 02.47°W	SD6922
Dassels	Hertfordshire	51.92°N 00.02°E	TL3927

=== Dat-Daz ===
Location	Locality	Coordinates (links to map & photo sources)	OS grid reference
Datchet	Berkshire	51.48°N 00.58°W	SU9877
Datchet Common	Berkshire	51.47°N 00.57°W	SU9976
Datchworth	Hertfordshire	51.85°N 00.15°W	TL2719
Datchworth Green	Hertfordshire	51.84°N 00.15°W	TL2718
Daubhill	Bolton	53.55°N 02.45°W	SD7007
Dauntsey	Wiltshire	51.53°N 02.01°W	ST9982
Dauntsey Lock	Wiltshire	51.51°N 02.01°W	ST9980
Dava	Highland	57.42°N 03.66°W	NJ0038
Davenham	Cheshire	53.22°N 02.52°W	SJ6570
Davenport	Stockport	53.38°N 02.16°W	SJ8987
Davenport	Cheshire	53.18°N 02.30°W	SJ8065
Davenport Green	Trafford	53.37°N 02.30°W	SJ8086
Davenport Green	Cheshire	53.30°N 02.25°W	SJ8379
Daventry	Northamptonshire	52.25°N 01.16°W	SP5762
Davidson's Mains	City of Edinburgh	55.96°N 03.28°W	NT2075
Davidstow	Cornwall	50.65°N 04.61°W	SX1587
David Street	Kent	51.35°N 00.35°E	TQ6464
David's Well	Powys	52.38°N 03.39°W	SO0577
Davington	Kent	51.31°N 00.86°E	TR0061
Davington	Dumfries and Galloway	55.30°N 03.21°W	NT2302
Daviot	Aberdeenshire	57.34°N 02.43°W	NJ7428
Daviot	Highland	57.42°N 04.13°W	NH7239
Davis's Town	East Sussex	50.93°N 00.16°E	TQ5217
Davoch of Grange	Moray	57.54°N 02.88°W	NJ4751
Davyhulme	Trafford	53.45°N 02.37°W	SJ7595
Daw Cross	North Yorkshire	53.95°N 01.55°W	SE2951
Dawdon	Durham	54.82°N 01.34°W	NZ4248
Daw End	Walsall	52.59°N 01.95°W	SK0300
Dawesgreen	Surrey	51.20°N 00.26°W	TQ2147
Dawker Hill	North Yorkshire	53.81°N 01.10°W	SE5936
Dawley	Shropshire	52.66°N 02.47°W	SJ6807
Dawley Bank	Shropshire	52.66°N 02.47°W	SJ6808
Dawlish	Devon	50.57°N 03.47°W	SX9676
Dawlish Warren	Devon	50.59°N 03.45°W	SX9778
Dawn	Conwy	53.23°N 03.70°W	SH8672
Daw's Cross	Essex	51.95°N 00.72°E	TL8732
Daw's Green	Somerset	50.98°N 03.15°W	ST1921
Daws Heath	Essex	51.56°N 00.61°E	TQ8188
Dawshill	Worcestershire	52.16°N 02.26°W	SO8252
Daw's House	Cornwall	50.61°N 04.39°W	SX3182
Dawsmere	Lincolnshire	52.84°N 00.13°E	TF4430
Daybrook	Nottinghamshire	52.99°N 01.15°W	SK5745
Day Green	Cheshire	53.11°N 02.34°W	SJ7757
Dayhills	Staffordshire	52.88°N 02.07°W	SJ9532
Dayhouse Bank	Worcestershire	52.40°N 02.06°W	SO9678
Daylesford	Gloucestershire	51.92°N 01.65°W	SP2425
Daywall	Shropshire	52.89°N 03.05°W	SJ2933

== Dd ==
Location	Locality	Coordinates (links to map & photo sources)	OS grid reference
Ddol	Flintshire	53.22°N 03.28°W	SJ1471
Ddôl-Cownwy	Powys	52.74°N 03.46°W	SJ0117
