= List of United Kingdom locations: Lm-Loi =

The United Kingdom

This is part of the list of United Kingdom locations: a gazetteer of place names in the United Kingdom showing each place's locality and geographical coordinates.

== Loa–Lob ==
Location	Locality	Coordinates (links to map & photo sources)	OS grid reference
Load Brook	Sheffield	53.38°N 01.59°W	SK2788
Loan	Falkirk	55.95°N 03.68°W	NS9575
Loandhu	Highland	57.77°N 04.00°W	NH8178
Loanend	Northumberland	55.74°N 02.09°W	NT9450
Loanhead	Midlothian	55.87°N 03.16°W	NT2765
Loans	South Ayrshire	55.54°N 04.63°W	NS3431
Loansdean	Northumberland	55.15°N 01.70°W	NZ1984
Lobb	Devon	51.11°N 04.18°W	SS4737
Lobhillcross	Devon	50.65°N 04.18°W	SX4686
Lobley Hill	Gateshead	54.93°N 01.64°W	NZ2360
Lobthorpe	Lincolnshire	52.76°N 00.59°W	SK9520

== Loc ==
Location	Locality	Coordinates (links to map & photo sources)	OS grid reference
Loch a' Charnain / Lochcarnan	Western Isles	57.37°N 07.32°W	NF8044
Loch a' Ghainmhich	Western Isles	58.16°N 06.61°W	NB2929
Lochailort	Highland	56.87°N 05.67°W	NM7682
Lochaline	Highland	56.53°N 05.79°W	NM6744
Lochanhully	Highland	57.28°N 03.81°W	NH9123
Lochans	Dumfries and Galloway	54.86°N 05.02°W	NX0656
Locharbriggs	Dumfries and Galloway	55.10°N 03.58°W	NX9980
Lochardil	Highland	57.44°N 04.23°W	NH6642
Lochawe / Loch Awe	Argyll and Bute	56.39°N 05.04°W	NN1227
Lochboisdale	Western Isles	57.14°N 07.31°W	NF7919
Lochbuie	Argyll and Bute	56.35°N 05.87°W	NM6125
Lochcarron	Highland	57.39°N 05.51°W	NG8939
Lochdon	Argyll and Bute	56.43°N 05.68°W	NM7333
Lochearnhead	Stirling	56.37°N 04.30°W	NN5823
Lochend (Thurso)	Highland	58.59°N 03.27°W	ND2668
Lochend (Loch Ness)	Highland	57.40°N 04.34°W	NH5937
Lochend	City of Edinburgh	55.95°N 03.17°W	NT2774
Locheport / Loch Euphort	Western Isles	57.54°N 07.26°W	NF8563
Lochfoot	Dumfries and Galloway	55.03°N 03.73°W	NX8973
Lochgair	Argyll and Bute	56.05°N 05.34°W	NR9290
Lochgelly	Fife	56.12°N 03.32°W	NT1893
Lochgilphead	Argyll and Bute	56.03°N 05.43°W	NR8688
Lochgoilhead	Argyll and Bute	56.16°N 04.91°W	NN1901
Lochhill	Moray	57.66°N 03.19°W	NJ2964
Lochinver	Highland	58.14°N 05.24°W	NC0922
Lochmaben	Dumfries and Galloway	55.12°N 03.44°W	NY0882
Lochmaddy	Western Isles	57.59°N 07.17°W	NF9168
Lochore	Fife	56.15°N 03.33°W	NT1796
Lochportain	Western Isles	57.62°N 07.12°W	NF9471
Lochranza	North Ayrshire	55.69°N 05.29°W	NR9350
Loch Sgioport	Western Isles	57.32°N 07.28°W	NF8238
Lochside (near Inverness)	Highland	57.54°N 03.98°W	NH8152
Lochside (Loch an Ruathair)	Highland	58.28°N 03.92°W	NC8735
Lochside	South Ayrshire	55.46°N 04.62°W	NS3422
Lochside	Dumfries and Galloway	55.07°N 03.64°W	NX9577
Lochside	Aberdeenshire	56.76°N 02.44°W	NO7364
Lochslin	Highland	57.79°N 03.97°W	NH8380
Lochton of Leys	Aberdeenshire	57.06°N 02.49°W	NO7097
Lochty	Perth and Kinross	56.40°N 03.52°W	NO0625
Lochwinnoch	Renfrewshire	55.79°N 04.63°W	NS3559
Lochwood	City of Glasgow	55.86°N 04.09°W	NS6966
Lochyside	Highland	56.82°N 05.09°W	NN1175
Lockengate	Cornwall	50.41°N 04.77°W	SX0361
Lockerbie	Dumfries and Galloway	55.11°N 03.36°W	NY1381
Lockeridge	Wiltshire	51.40°N 01.80°W	SU1467
Lockeridge Dene	Wiltshire	51.40°N 01.80°W	SU1467
Lockerley	Hampshire	51.03°N 01.58°W	SU2926
Lockhills	Cumbria	54.81°N 02.77°W	NY5047
Locking	North Somerset	51.32°N 02.92°W	ST3659
Locking Stumps	Cheshire	53.42°N 02.54°W	SJ6492
Lockington	East Riding of Yorkshire	53.91°N 00.49°W	SE9947
Lockington	Leicestershire	52.83°N 01.31°W	SK4627
Lockleaze	City of Bristol	51.48°N 02.57°W	ST6076
Lockleywood	Shropshire	52.84°N 02.46°W	SJ6928
Locksbottom	Bromley	51.36°N 00.05°E	TQ4365
Locksbrook	Bath and North East Somerset	51.37°N 02.40°W	ST7264
Locksgreen	Isle of Wight	50.70°N 01.37°W	SZ4490
Locks Heath	Hampshire	50.86°N 01.27°W	SU5107
Lockton	North Yorkshire	54.29°N 00.71°W	SE8489
Lockwood	Kirklees	53.63°N 01.80°W	SE1315

== Lod–Loi ==
Location	Locality	Coordinates (links to map & photo sources)	OS grid reference
Loddington	Northamptonshire	52.39°N 00.81°W	SP8178
Loddington	Leicestershire	52.61°N 00.84°W	SK7802
Loddiswell	Devon	50.31°N 03.81°W	SX7148
Loddon	Norfolk	52.52°N 01.47°E	TM3698
Loddon Ingloss	Norfolk	52.51°N 01.44°E	TM3496
Lode	Cambridgeshire	52.23°N 00.23°E	TL5362
Lode Heath	Solihull	52.41°N 01.78°W	SP1580
Loders	Dorset	50.74°N 02.72°W	SY4994
Lodge	Yorkshire	52.19°N 01.92°W	SE0477
Lodgebank	Shropshire	52.82°N 02.60°W	SJ5925
Lodge Green	Solihull	52.44°N 01.63°W	SP2583
Lodge Green	North Yorkshire	54.37°N 02.07°W	SD9598
Lodge Hill	Cornwall	50.44°N 04.48°W	SX2463
Lodge Hill	Birmingham	52.43°N 01.97°W	SP0282
Lodge Hill	Wakefield	53.68°N 01.57°W	SE2821
Lodge Lees	Kent	51.18°N 01.14°E	TR2047
Lodge Moor	Sheffield	53.36°N 01.58°W	SK2885
Lodge Park	Worcestershire	52.29°N 01.94°W	SP0466
Lodsworth	West Sussex	50.99°N 00.69°W	SU9223
Lodsworth Common	West Sussex	51.00°N 00.68°W	SU9224
Lodway	North Somerset	51.48°N 02.69°W	ST5276
Lofthouse	North Yorkshire	54.15°N 01.84°W	SE1073
Lofthouse	Wakefield	53.72°N 01.50°W	SE3325
Lofthouse Gate	Wakefield	53.71°N 01.50°W	SE3324
Loftus	Redcar and Cleveland	54.55°N 00.90°W	NZ7118
Logan	East Ayrshire	55.45°N 04.23°W	NS5920
Loganlea	West Lothian	55.84°N 03.63°W	NS9862
Loggerheads	Denbighshire	53.14°N 03.22°W	SJ1862
Loggerheads	Staffordshire	52.92°N 02.40°W	SJ7336
Logie	Angus	56.75°N 02.50°W	NO6963
Logie	Fife	56.36°N 02.97°W	NO4020
Logie	Moray	57.53°N 03.65°W	NJ0150
Logie Coldstone	Aberdeenshire	57.12°N 02.94°W	NJ4304
Logie Hill	Highland	57.75°N 04.08°W	NH7676
Logie Pert	Angus	56.76°N 02.55°W	NO6664
Logierait	Perth and Kinross	56.64°N 03.68°W	NN9751
Login	Carmarthenshire	51.87°N 04.67°W	SN1623
Logmore Green	Surrey	51.21°N 00.36°W	TQ1447
