= List of United Kingdom locations: Newton =

The United Kingdom

This is part of the list of United Kingdom locations: a gazetteer of place names in the United Kingdom showing each place's locality and geographical coordinates.

== Newton ==
Location	Locality	Coordinates (links to map & photo sources)	OS grid reference
Newton	Bedfordshire	52.08°N 00.22°W	TL2244
Newton	Bridgend	51.48°N 03.68°W	SS8377
Newton or Newton-in-the-Isle (Fenland)	Cambridgeshire	52.70°N 00.11°E	TF4314
Newton (South Cambridgeshire)	Cambridgeshire	52.12°N 00.08°E	TL4349
Newton	Cardiff	51.49°N 03.11°W	ST2378
Newton (Chester)	Cheshire	53.20°N 02.88°W	SJ4168
Newton (Tattenhall)	Cheshire	53.12°N 02.74°W	SJ5059
Newton (Vale Royal)	Cheshire	53.27°N 02.72°W	SJ5275
Newton	Cornwall	50.43°N 04.69°W	SX0963
Newton (Newton-in-Furness)	Cumbria	54.12°N 03.19°W	SD2271
Newton	Derbyshire	53.12°N 01.34°W	SK4459
Newton	Doncaster	53.51°N 01.15°W	SE5602
Newton	Dorset	50.91°N 02.32°W	ST7713
Newton	Dumfries and Galloway	55.01°N 03.15°W	NY2670
Newton (Bucknell)	Herefordshire	52.31°N 02.92°W	SO3769
Newton (Dorstone)	Herefordshire	52.08°N 03.03°W	SO2943
Newton (Hereford)	Herefordshire	51.98°N 02.96°W	SO3432
Newton (Leominster)	Herefordshire	52.17°N 02.73°W	SO5053
Newton (near Inverness)	Highland	57.50°N 04.10°W	NH7448
Newton (near Wick)	Highland	58.42°N 03.13°W	ND3449
Newton (Fylde)	Lancashire	53.81°N 03.00°W	SD3436
Newton (Lancaster)	Lancashire	54.16°N 02.62°W	SD5974
Newton (Newton-in-Bowland)	Lancashire	53.94°N 02.47°W	SD6950
Newton	Lincolnshire	52.91°N 00.45°W	TF0436
Newton	Moray	57.64°N 03.40°W	NJ1663
Newton	Norfolk	52.70°N 00.70°E	TF8315
Newton	North Ayrshire	55.70°N 05.29°W	NR9351
Newton	Northamptonshire	52.43°N 00.70°W	SP8883
Newton	Northumberland	54.97°N 01.95°W	NZ0364
Newton	Nottinghamshire	52.96°N 00.98°W	SK6841
Newton	Sandwell	52.53°N 01.95°W	SP0393
Newton (near Denholm)	Scottish Borders	55.47°N 02.63°W	NT6020
Newton (near Hawick)	Scottish Borders	55.44°N 02.79°W	NT5017
Newton (Welshampton)	Shropshire	52.90°N 02.86°W	SJ4234
Newton (Worfield)	Shropshire	52.57°N 02.39°W	SO7397
Newton	Somerset	51.13°N 03.28°W	ST1038
Newton	South Gloucestershire	51.62°N 02.52°W	ST6492
Newton (Cambuslang)	South Lanarkshire	55.81°N 04.12°W	NS6760
Newton (Clydesdale)	South Lanarkshire	55.56°N 03.69°W	NS9331
Newton	Staffordshire	52.82°N 01.95°W	SK0325
Newton (Newton Green)	Suffolk	52.02°N 00.78°E	TL9140
Newton	Swansea	51.57°N 04.02°W	SS6088
Newton	Tameside	53.46°N 02.07°W	SJ9596
Newton	Warwickshire	52.39°N 01.22°W	SP5378
Newton	West Lothian	55.97°N 03.45°W	NT0977
Newton	Wiltshire	50.99°N 01.67°W	SU2322
Newton	Wirral	53.37°N 03.15°W	SJ2387
Newton Abbot	Devon	50.52°N 03.60°W	SX8671
Newton Arlosh	Cumbria	54.88°N 03.24°W	NY2055
Newton Aycliffe	Durham	54.61°N 01.58°W	NZ2724
Newton Bewley	Stockton-on-Tees	54.62°N 01.28°W	NZ4626
Newton Blossomville	Milton Keynes	52.14°N 00.65°W	SP9251
Newton Bromswold	Northamptonshire	52.27°N 00.55°W	SP9965
Newton Burgoland	Leicestershire	52.67°N 01.45°W	SK3709
Newton by Toft	Lincolnshire	53.36°N 00.42°W	TF0587
Newton Cross	Pembrokeshire	51.90°N 05.06°W	SM8927
Newton Downs	Devon	50.33°N 04.03°W	SX5549
Newton Ferrers	Cornwall	50.47°N 04.33°W	SX3465
Newton Ferrers	Devon	50.31°N 04.05°W	SX5448
Newtonferry	Western Isles	57.68°N 07.22°W	NF8978
Newton Flotman	Norfolk	52.53°N 01.25°E	TM2198
Newtongrange	Midlothian	55.86°N 03.05°W	NT3464
Newton Green	Monmouthshire	51.61°N 02.70°W	ST5191
Newton Hall	Durham	54.79°N 01.58°W	NZ2745
Newton Hall	Northumberland	54.98°N 01.95°W	NZ0365
Newton Harcourt	Leicestershire	52.55°N 01.07°W	SP6396
Newton Heath	Manchester	53.49°N 02.18°W	SD8800
Newtonhill	Aberdeenshire	57.02°N 02.14°W	NO9193
Newtonhill	Highland	57.45°N 04.38°W	NH5743
Newton Hill	Wakefield	53.69°N 01.50°W	SE3322
Newton Hurst	Staffordshire	52.82°N 01.92°W	SK0525
Newtonia	Cheshire	53.19°N 02.46°W	SJ6966
Newton Ketton	Darlington	54.57°N 01.52°W	NZ3120
Newton Kyme	North Yorkshire	53.89°N 01.30°W	SE4644
Newton-le-Willows	North Yorkshire	54.29°N 01.67°W	SE2189
Newton-le-Willows	St Helens	53.45°N 02.63°W	SJ5895
Newton Longville	Buckinghamshire	51.97°N 00.77°W	SP8431
Newton Mearns	East Renfrewshire	55.76°N 04.34°W	NS5355
Newtonmill	Angus	56.76°N 02.65°W	NO6064
Newtonmore	Highland	57.06°N 04.12°W	NN7199
Newton Morrell	North Yorkshire	54.47°N 01.64°W	NZ2309
Newton Morrell	Oxfordshire	51.95°N 01.11°W	SP6129
Newton Mulgrave	North Yorkshire	54.52°N 00.79°W	NZ7815
Newton of Ardtoe	Highland	56.76°N 05.86°W	NM6470
Newton of Balcormo	Fife	56.22°N 02.79°W	NO5104
Newton of Boysack	Angus	56.61°N 02.65°W	NO6047
Newton of Falkland	Fife	56.25°N 03.19°W	NO2607
Newton of Pitcairns	Perth and Kinross	56.30°N 03.58°W	NO0214
Newton on Ayr	South Ayrshire	55.47°N 04.62°W	NS3423
Newton-on-Ouse	North Yorkshire	54.02°N 01.22°W	SE5159
Newton-on-Rawcliffe	North Yorkshire	54.29°N 00.75°W	SE8190
Newton on the Hill	Shropshire	52.80°N 02.77°W	SJ4823
Newton on the Moor	Northumberland	55.33°N 01.74°W	NU1605
Newton on Trent	Lincolnshire	53.25°N 00.75°W	SK8374
Newton Park	Argyll and Bute	55.87°N 04.97°W	NS1469
Newton Park	St Helens	53.44°N 02.61°W	SJ5994
Newton Peveril	Dorset	50.79°N 02.10°W	SY9399
Newton Poppleford	Devon	50.69°N 03.30°W	SY0889
Newton Purcell	Oxfordshire	51.96°N 01.09°W	SP6230
Newton Regis	Warwickshire	52.66°N 01.60°W	SK2707
Newton Reigny	Cumbria	54.67°N 02.82°W	NY4731
Newton Rigg	Cumbria	54.67°N 02.79°W	NY4931
Newton Solney	Derbyshire	52.82°N 01.58°W	SK2825
Newton Stacey	Hampshire	51.15°N 01.41°W	SU4140
Newton St Cyres	Devon	50.77°N 03.60°W	SX8798
Newton Stewart	Dumfries and Galloway	54.95°N 04.50°W	NX4065
Newton St Faith	Norfolk	52.70°N 01.28°E	TG2217
Newton St Loe	Bath and North East Somerset	51.37°N 02.43°W	ST7064
Newton St Petrock	Devon	50.88°N 04.26°W	SS4112
Newton Tony	Wiltshire	51.15°N 01.70°W	SU2140
Newton Tracey	Devon	51.01°N 04.11°W	SS5226
Newton under Roseberry	Redcar and Cleveland	54.50°N 01.13°W	NZ5613
Newton Underwood	Northumberland	55.16°N 01.78°W	NZ1486
Newton upon Derwent	East Riding of Yorkshire	53.93°N 00.90°W	SE7249
Newton Valence	Hampshire	51.08°N 00.97°W	SU7232
Newton Wamphray	Dumfries and Galloway	55.23°N 03.40°W	NY1194
Newton-with-Scales	Lancashire	53.76°N 02.85°W	SD4430
Newton Wood	Tameside	53.46°N 02.10°W	SJ9396
