= List of United Kingdom locations: Crot-Croz =

The United Kingdom

This is part of the list of United Kingdom locations: a gazetteer of place names in the United Kingdom showing each place's locality and geographical coordinates.

== Cro (continued) ==
=== Crot-Croz ===
Location	Locality	Coordinates (links to map & photo sources)	OS grid reference
Crouch (Tonbridge and Malling)	Kent	51.27°N 00.30°E	TQ6155
Crouch (Swale)	Kent	51.28°N 00.93°E	TR0558
Crouch End	Haringey	51.57°N 00.13°W	TQ2988
Crouchers	West Sussex	50.81°N 00.80°W	SU8402
Croucheston	Wiltshire	51.02°N 01.91°W	SU0625
Crouch Hill	Dorset	50.88°N 02.42°W	ST7010
Croughton	Cheshire	53.24°N 02.88°W	SJ4172
Croughton	Northamptonshire	51.99°N 01.21°W	SP5433
Crovie	Aberdeenshire	57.67°N 02.33°W	NJ8065
Crow	Hampshire	50.82°N 01.77°W	SU1603
Crowan	Cornwall	50.15°N 05.30°W	SW6434
Crowborough	East Sussex	51.04°N 00.15°E	TQ5130
Crowborough	Staffordshire	53.11°N 02.15°W	SJ9057
Crowborough Warren	East Sussex	51.04°N 00.13°E	TQ5030
Crowcombe	Somerset	51.11°N 03.24°W	ST1336
Crowcroft	Worcestershire	52.14°N 02.35°W	SO7650
Crowdecote	Derbyshire	53.18°N 01.85°W	SK1065
Crowden	Derbyshire	53.48°N 01.89°W	SK0799
Crowden	Devon	50.77°N 04.14°W	SX4999
Crowder Park	Devon	50.41°N 03.83°W	SX7059
Crowdhill	Hampshire	50.97°N 01.30°W	SU4920
Crowdleham	Kent	51.29°N 00.23°E	TQ5658
Crowdon	North Yorkshire	54.35°N 00.47°W	SE9997
Crow Edge	Barnsley	53.53°N 01.72°W	SE1804
Crowell	Oxfordshire	51.68°N 00.93°W	SU7499
Crowell Hill	Oxfordshire	51.67°N 00.91°W	SU7598
Crowfield	Northamptonshire	52.06°N 01.11°W	SP6141
Crowfield	Suffolk	52.17°N 01.12°E	TM1457
Crowgate Street	Norfolk	52.73°N 01.40°E	TG3021
Crowgreaves	Shropshire	52.58°N 02.38°W	SO7499
Crow Green	Essex	51.64°N 00.28°E	TQ5896
Crow Hill	Herefordshire	51.93°N 02.53°W	SO6326
Crowhill	Tameside	53.48°N 02.12°W	SJ9299
Crowhole	Derbyshire	53.27°N 01.50°W	SK3375
Crowhurst	Surrey	51.20°N 00.01°W	TQ3947
Crowhurst	East Sussex	50.88°N 00.48°E	TQ7512
Crowhurst Lane End	Surrey	51.21°N 00.03°W	TQ3748
Crowland	Lincolnshire	52.67°N 00.16°W	TF2410
Crowlas	Cornwall	50.14°N 05.48°W	SW5133
Crowle	Worcestershire	52.20°N 02.11°W	SO9256
Crowle	North Lincolnshire	53.59°N 00.83°W	SE7712
Crowle Green	Worcestershire	52.20°N 02.13°W	SO9156
Crowle Hill	North Lincolnshire	53.60°N 00.83°W	SE7713
Crowle Park	North Lincolnshire	53.59°N 00.83°W	SE7712
Crowlin Islands	Highland	57.33°N 05.82°W	NG697340
Crowlista	Western Isles	58.18°N 07.03°W	NB0433
Crowmarsh Gifford	Oxfordshire	51.59°N 01.12°W	SU6189
Crown	Highland	57.47°N 04.21°W	NH6745
Crown Corner	Suffolk	52.28°N 01.29°E	TM2570
Crown East	Worcestershire	52.18°N 02.27°W	SO8154
Crow Nest	Bradford	53.84°N 01.83°W	SE1139
Crownfield	Buckinghamshire	51.68°N 00.84°W	SU8099
Crownhill	Devon	50.40°N 04.14°W	SX4858
Crownhill	Milton Keynes	52.02°N 00.80°W	SP8237
Crown Hills	City of Leicester	52.63°N 01.08°W	SK6204
Crownland	Suffolk	52.29°N 00.94°E	TM0170
Crownpits	Surrey	51.17°N 00.61°W	SU9743
Crownthorpe	Norfolk	52.58°N 01.06°E	TG0803
Crowntown	Cornwall	50.12°N 05.31°W	SW6330
Crown Wood	Berkshire	51.39°N 00.75°W	SU8767
Crows-an-wra	Cornwall	50.08°N 05.65°W	SW3927
Crow's Green	Essex	51.89°N 00.45°E	TL6925
Crowshill	Norfolk	52.61°N 00.86°E	TF9406
Crowsley	Oxfordshire	51.50°N 00.96°W	SU7279
Crow's Nest	Cornwall	50.49°N 04.45°W	SX2669
Crowsnest	Shropshire	52.60°N 02.94°W	SJ3601
Crowther's Pool	Powys	52.12°N 03.15°W	SO2148
Crowthorne	Berkshire	51.36°N 00.79°W	SU8464
Crowton	Cheshire	53.26°N 02.64°W	SJ5774
Crow Wood	Cheshire	53.36°N 02.72°W	SJ5286
Croxall	Staffordshire	52.71°N 01.72°W	SK1913
Croxby	Lincolnshire	53.46°N 00.20°W	TF1998
Croxby Top	Lincolnshire	53.46°N 00.25°W	TF1698
Croxdale	Durham	54.71°N 01.59°W	NZ2636
Croxden	Staffordshire	52.94°N 01.91°W	SK0639
Croxley Green	Hertfordshire	51.64°N 00.45°W	TQ0795
Croxteth	Liverpool	53.45°N 02.90°W	SJ4096
Croxton	Cambridgeshire	52.21°N 00.18°W	TL2459
Croxton	North Lincolnshire	53.59°N 00.35°W	TA0912
Croxton (Breckland)	Norfolk	52.44°N 00.75°E	TL8786
Croxton (North Norfolk)	Norfolk	52.84°N 00.93°E	TF9831
Croxton	Staffordshire	52.87°N 02.32°W	SJ7831
Croxtonbank	Staffordshire	52.88°N 02.32°W	SJ7832
Croxton Green	Cheshire	53.06°N 02.68°W	SJ5452
Croxton Kerrial	Leicestershire	52.85°N 00.76°W	SK8329
Croy	Highland	57.51°N 04.02°W	NH7949
Croy	East Dunbartonshire	55.95°N 04.05°W	NS7275
Croyde	Devon	51.12°N 04.23°W	SS4439
Croyde Bay	Devon	51.12°N 04.24°W	SS4339
Croydon	Cambridgeshire	52.12°N 00.08°W	TL3149
Croydon		51.35°N 00.09°W	TQ3364
Crozen	Herefordshire	52.12°N 02.62°W	SO5748
