= List of United Kingdom locations: J =

The United Kingdom

This is part of the list of United Kingdom locations: a gazetteer of place names in the United Kingdom showing each place's locality and geographical coordinates.

== Ja ==
Location	Locality	Coordinates (links to map & photo sources)	OS grid reference
Jackfield	Shropshire	52.61°N 02.47°W	SJ6802
Jack Green	Lancashire	53.72°N 02.62°W	SD5925
Jack Hayes	Staffordshire	53.03°N 02.10°W	SJ9349
Jack-in-the-Green	Devon	50.74°N 03.40°W	SY0195
Jacksdale	Nottinghamshire	53.05°N 01.34°W	SK4451
Jack's Green	Gloucestershire	51.77°N 02.17°W	SO8809
Jack's Green	Essex	51.86°N 00.27°E	TL5721
Jack's Hatch	Essex	51.73°N 00.06°E	TL4306
Jackson Bridge	Kirklees	53.55°N 01.75°W	SE1607
Jacobstow	Cornwall	50.72°N 04.56°W	SX1995
Jacobstowe	Devon	50.79°N 04.01°W	SS5801
Jacobs Well	Surrey	51.25°N 00.58°W	SU9952
Jagger Green	Calderdale	53.66°N 01.86°W	SE0919
Jameston	Pembrokeshire	51.656°N 04.812°W	SS055990
Jamestown	Highland	57.56°N 04.55°W	NH4756
Jamestown	West Dunbartonshire	55.99°N 04.58°W	NS3981
Jamphlars	Fife	56.14°N 03.28°W	NT2095
Janetstown (near Thurso)	Highland	58.57°N 03.58°W	ND0866
Janetstown (Wick)	Highland	58.43°N 03.11°W	ND3550
Janke's Green	Essex	51.92°N 00.76°E	TL9029
Jarrow	South Tyneside	54.97°N 01.47°W	NZ3465
Jarvis Brook	East Sussex	51.04°N 00.18°E	TQ5333
Jasper's Green	Essex	51.90°N 00.49°E	TL7226
Java	Argyll and Bute	56.46°N 05.71°W	NM7137
Jaw Hill	Leeds	53.70°N 01.56°W	SE2923
Jaywick	Essex	51.77°N 01.11°E	TM1513

== Je-Ji ==
Location	Locality	Coordinates (links to map & photo sources)	OS grid reference
Jealott's Hill	Berkshire	51.44°N 00.76°W	SU8673
Jeaniefield	Scottish Borders	55.66°N 02.74°W	NT5342
Jedburgh	Scottish Borders	55.47°N 02.55°W	NT6520
Jeffreyston	Pembrokeshire	51.72°N 04.78°W	SN0806
Jemimaville	Highland	57.65°N 04.16°W	NH7165
Jennetts Hill	Berkshire	51.43°N 01.18°W	SU5771
Jennyfield	North Yorkshire	53.99°N 01.57°W	SE2856
Jerby East	Isle of Man	54.36°N 04.49°W	SC3899
Jericho	Bury	53.59°N 02.25°W	SD8311
Jersey Marine	Neath Port Talbot	51.63°N 03.86°W	SS7194
Jerviswood	South Lanarkshire	55.68°N 03.78°W	NS8845
Jesmond	Newcastle upon Tyne	54.98°N 01.61°W	NZ2566
Jevington	East Sussex	50.78°N 00.21°E	TQ5601
Jewell's Cross	Devon	50.80°N 04.47°W	SS2603
Jingle Street	Monmouthshire	51.78°N 02.76°W	SO4710

== Jo ==
Location	Locality	Coordinates (links to map & photo sources)	OS grid reference
Jockey End	Hertfordshire	51.80°N 00.49°W	TL0413
Jodrell Bank	Cheshire	53.22°N 02.31°W	SJ7970
Johnby	Cumbria	54.68°N 02.88°W	NY4333
John O'Gaunt	Leicestershire	52.67°N 00.92°W	SK7309
John O'Gaunts	Leeds	53.75°N 01.47°W	SE3529
John o' Groats	Highland	58.63°N 03.06°W	ND3872
John's Cross	East Sussex	50.96°N 00.47°E	TQ7421
Johnshaven	Aberdeenshire	56.79°N 02.34°W	NO7967
Johnson Fold	Bolton	53.59°N 02.48°W	SD6811
Johnson's Hillock	Lancashire	53.68°N 02.62°W	SD5921
Johnson Street	Norfolk	52.69°N 01.50°E	TG3717
Johnston	Pembrokeshire	51.75°N 05.00°W	SM9310
Johnstone	Renfrewshire	55.82°N 04.50°W	NS4362
Johnstonebridge	Dumfries and Galloway	55.21°N 03.43°W	NY0992
Johnston's Point	Argyll and Bute	55.36°N 05.52°W	NR768134
Johnstown	Carmarthenshire	51.84°N 04.33°W	SN3919
Johnstown	Wrexham	53.00°N 03.04°W	SJ3046
Jolly's Bottom	Cornwall	50.26°N 05.15°W	SW7545
Joppa	Cornwall	50.17°N 05.41°W	SW5636
Joppa	South Ayrshire	55.43°N 04.53°W	NS4019
Joppa	City of Edinburgh	55.94°N 03.10°W	NT3173
Jordan	Rotherham	53.42°N 01.39°W	SK4092
Jordan Green	Norfolk	52.74°N 01.06°E	TG0721
Jordanhill	City of Glasgow	55.88°N 04.35°W	NS5368
Jordans	Buckinghamshire	51.60°N 00.60°W	SU9791
Jordanston	Pembrokeshire	51.94°N 05.04°W	SM9132
Jordanthorpe	Sheffield	53.32°N 01.47°W	SK3581
Joyden's Wood	Kent	51.43°N 00.16°E	TQ5072
Joyford	Gloucestershire	51.81°N 02.62°W	SO5713
Joy's Green	Gloucestershire	51.84°N 02.58°W	SO6016

== Ju ==
Location	Locality	Coordinates (links to map & photo sources)	OS grid reference
Jubilee	Oldham	53.58°N 02.09°W	SD9410
Jugbank	Staffordshire	52.91°N 02.37°W	SJ7535
Jump	Barnsley	53.50°N 01.42°W	SE3801
Jumpers Common	Dorset	50.74°N 01.80°W	SZ1494
Jumper's Town	East Sussex	51.06°N 00.08°E	TQ4632
Junction	North Yorkshire	53.90°N 01.98°W	SE0145
Juniper Green	City of Edinburgh	55.89°N 03.28°W	NT2068
Jura	Argyll and Bute	55.93°N 05.95°W	NR529780
Jurby Head	Isle of Man	54.35°N 04.53°W	SC353982
Jurby West	Isle of Man	54.35°N 04.54°W	SC3598
Jurston	Devon	50.64°N 03.85°W	SX6984
Jury's Gap	East Sussex	50.92°N 00.81°E	TQ9818
