= List of United Kingdom locations: Bar =

The United Kingdom

This is part of the list of United Kingdom locations: a gazetteer of place names in the United Kingdom showing each place's locality and geographical coordinates.

== Ba (continued) ==
=== Bara-Barm ===
Location	Locality	Coordinates (links to map & photo sources)	OS grid reference
Barabhas	Western Isles	58.35°N 06.51°W	NB3649
Barabhas Iarach	Western Isles	58.34°N 06.53°W	NB3549
Baramore	Highland	56.79°N 05.86°W	NM6474
Barassie	South Ayrshire	55.55°N 04.66°W	NS3232
Baravullin	Argyll and Bute	56.50°N 05.43°W	NM8940
Barbaraville	Highland	57.72°N 04.11°W	NH7472
Barbauchlaw	West Lothian	55.90°N 03.71°W	NS9369
Barber Booth	Derbyshire	53.35°N 01.83°W	SK1184
Barber Green	Cumbria	54.23°N 02.93°W	SD3982
Barber's Moor	Lancashire	53.66°N 02.77°W	SD4919
Barbhas Uarach	Western Isles	58.35°N 06.51°W	NB3650
Barbican	Devon	50.36°N 04.13°W	SX4854
Barbieston	South Ayrshire	55.42°N 04.48°W	NS4317
Barbon	Cumbria	54.23°N 02.58°W	SD6282
Barbourne	Worcestershire	52.21°N 02.23°W	SO8457
Barbreack	Argyll and Bute	56.00°N 05.67°W	NR7185
Barbridge	Cheshire	53.10°N 02.58°W	SJ6156
Barbrook	Devon	51.20°N 03.84°W	SS7147
Barby	Northamptonshire	52.32°N 01.20°W	SP5470
Barby Nortoft	Northamptonshire	52.34°N 01.19°W	SP5572
Barcaldine	Argyll and Bute	56.51°N 05.31°W	NM9641
Barcelona	Cornwall	50.34°N 04.51°W	SX2153
Barcheston	Warwickshire	52.04°N 01.62°W	SP2639
Barclose	Cumbria	54.95°N 02.87°W	NY4462
Barcombe	East Sussex	50.90°N -00.00°E	TQ4114
Barcombe Cross	East Sussex	50.91°N 00.01°E	TQ4215
Barcroft	Bradford	53.82°N 01.94°W	SE0437
Barden	North Yorkshire	54.33°N 01.78°W	SE1493
Barden Park	Kent	51.19°N 00.24°E	TQ5746
Bardfield End Green	Essex	51.94°N 00.35°E	TL6230
Bardfield Saling	Essex	51.90°N 00.44°E	TL6826
Bard Head	Shetland Islands	60.10°N 01.08°W	HU512360
Bardney	Lincolnshire	53.20°N 00.33°W	TF1169
Bardon	Leicestershire	52.70°N 01.33°W	SK4512
Bardon Mill	Northumberland	54.97°N 02.34°W	NY7864
Bardowie	East Dunbartonshire	55.92°N 04.27°W	NS5873
Bardown	East Sussex	51.03°N 00.36°E	TQ6629
Bardrainney	Inverclyde	55.92°N 04.67°W	NS3373
Bardsea	Cumbria	54.15°N 03.07°W	SD3074
Bardsey	Leeds	53.88°N 01.45°W	SE3643
Bardsey Island	Gwynedd	52.76°N 04.78°W	SH119220
Bardsley	Tameside	53.50°N 02.10°W	SD9301
Bardwell	Suffolk	52.32°N 00.84°E	TL9473
Bare	Lancashire	54.06°N 02.84°W	SD4564
Bare Ash	Somerset	51.10°N 03.07°W	ST2535
Bareless	Northumberland	55.63°N 02.20°W	NT8738
Bar End	Hampshire	51.04°N 01.31°W	SU4828
Barend	Dumfries and Galloway	54.87°N 03.74°W	NX8855
Barepot	Cumbria	54.64°N 03.53°W	NY0129
Bareppa	Cornwall	50.11°N 05.10°W	SW7829
Barford	Hampshire	51.12°N 00.78°W	SU8537
Barford	Warwickshire	52.23°N 01.60°W	SP2760
Barford	Norfolk	52.62°N 01.11°E	TG1107
Barford St John	Oxfordshire	51.99°N 01.37°W	SP4333
Barford St Martin	Wiltshire	51.07°N 01.93°W	SU0531
Barford St Michael	Oxfordshire	51.98°N 01.37°W	SP4332
Barfrestone	Kent	51.20°N 01.23°E	TR2650
Bargarran	Renfrewshire	55.90°N 04.46°W	NS4671
Bargate	Derbyshire	53.01°N 01.46°W	SK3646
Bargeddie	North Lanarkshire	55.84°N 04.07°W	NS7063
Bargod	Caerphilly	51.68°N 03.24°W	ST1499
Bargoed	Caerphilly	51.68°N 03.24°W	ST1499
Bargrennan	Dumfries and Galloway	55.05°N 04.58°W	NX3576
Barham	Kent	51.20°N 01.14°E	TR2050
Barham	Cambridgeshire	52.36°N 00.34°W	TL1375
Barham	Suffolk	52.11°N 01.12°E	TM1451
Barharrow	Dumfries and Galloway	54.84°N 04.16°W	NX6152
Bar Hill	Cambridgeshire	52.24°N 00.02°E	TL3863
Bar Hill	Staffordshire	52.98°N 02.35°W	SJ7643
Barholm	Lincolnshire	52.67°N 00.38°W	TF0910
Barkby	Leicestershire	52.67°N 01.06°W	SK6309
Barkby Thorpe	Leicestershire	52.67°N 01.06°W	SK6309
Barkers Green	Shropshire	52.84°N 02.71°W	SJ5228
Barkers Hill	Wiltshire	51.02°N 02.14°W	ST9025
Barkestone-le-Vale	Leicestershire	52.89°N 00.84°W	SK7834
Barkham	Berkshire	51.39°N 00.88°W	SU7867
Barking	Suffolk	52.13°N 01.02°E	TM0753
Barking	Barking and Dagenham	51.53°N 00.07°E	TQ4484
Barkingside	Redbridge	51.58°N 00.07°E	TQ4489
Barking Tye	Suffolk	52.12°N 01.00°E	TM0652
Barkisland	Calderdale	53.66°N 01.92°W	SE0519
Barkla Shop	Cornwall	50.30°N 05.18°W	SW7350
Barkston	Lincolnshire	52.95°N 00.61°W	SK9341
Barkston Ash	North Yorkshire	53.81°N 01.25°W	SE4936
Barkway	Hertfordshire	51.99°N 00.01°E	TL3835
Barlake	Somerset	51.23°N 02.50°W	ST6549
Barlanark	City of Glasgow	55.85°N 04.14°W	NS6664
Barland	Powys	52.25°N 03.05°W	SO2862
Barland Common	Swansea	51.58°N 04.05°W	SS5889
Barlaston	Staffordshire	52.93°N 02.16°W	SJ8938
Barlavington	West Sussex	50.93°N 00.62°W	SU9716
Barlborough	Derbyshire	53.28°N 01.29°W	SK4777
Barlby	North Yorkshire	53.79°N 01.04°W	SE6334
Barlestone	Leicestershire	52.64°N 01.38°W	SK4205
Barley	Hertfordshire	52.02°N 00.03°E	TL4038
Barley	Lancashire	53.85°N 02.27°W	SD8240
Barleycroft End	Hertfordshire	51.92°N 00.07°E	TL4327
Barley End	Buckinghamshire	51.81°N 00.60°W	SP9614
Barley Green	Lancashire	53.85°N 02.29°W	SD8140
Barley Mow	Durham	54.88°N 01.58°W	NZ2754
Barleythorpe	Rutland	52.67°N 00.75°W	SK8409
Barling	Essex	51.56°N 00.78°E	TQ9389
Barlings	Lincolnshire	53.25°N 00.39°W	TF0774
Barlow	Derbyshire	53.26°N 01.49°W	SK3474
Barlow	Gateshead	54.93°N 01.76°W	NZ1560
Barlow	North Yorkshire	53.74°N 01.03°W	SE6428
Barlow Moor	Manchester	53.42°N 02.27°W	SJ8292
Barmby Moor	East Riding of Yorkshire	53.92°N 00.82°W	SE7748
Barmby on the Marsh	East Riding of Yorkshire	53.74°N 00.97°W	SE6828
Barmer	Norfolk	52.86°N 00.68°E	TF8133
Barming Heath	Kent	51.26°N 00.46°E	TQ7255
Bar Moor	Gateshead	54.97°N 01.78°W	NZ1464
Barmouth	Gwynedd	52.71°N 04.05°W	SH6115
Barmpton	Darlington	54.55°N 01.52°W	NZ3118
Barmston	Sunderland	54.89°N 01.51°W	NZ3156
Barmston	East Riding of Yorkshire	54.01°N 00.23°W	TA1659
Barmulloch	City of Glasgow	55.88°N 04.20°W	NS6268

=== Barn-Barz ===
Location	Locality	Coordinates (links to map & photo sources)	OS grid reference
Barnaby Green	Suffolk	52.35°N 01.62°E	TM4779
Barnack	Cambridgeshire	52.62°N 00.42°W	TF0704
Barnacle	Warwickshire	52.45°N 01.44°W	SP3884
Barnafield	Shetland Islands	60.52°N 01.38°W	HU3482
Barnard Castle	Durham	54.53°N 01.92°W	NZ0516
Barnard Gate	Oxfordshire	51.78°N 01.42°W	SP4010
Barnardiston	Suffolk	52.10°N 00.49°E	TL7148
Barnards Green	Worcestershire	52.10°N 02.32°W	SO7845
Barnardtown	City of Newport	51.58°N 02.99°W	ST3188
Barnbow Carr	Leeds	53.81°N 01.40°W	SE3936
Barnburgh	Doncaster	53.52°N 01.27°W	SE4803
Barnby	Suffolk	52.44°N 01.63°E	TM4789
Barnby Dun	Doncaster	53.57°N 01.08°W	SE6109
Barnby in the Willows	Nottinghamshire	53.05°N 00.73°W	SK8552
Barnby Moor	Nottinghamshire	53.34°N 01.00°W	SK6684
Barncluith	South Lanarkshire	55.76°N 04.04°W	NS7254
Barne Barton	Devon	50.39°N 04.19°W	SX4457
Barnehurst	Bexley	51.45°N 00.15°E	TQ5075
Barnellan	East Dunbartonshire	55.94°N 4.27°W	NS5817
Barnes	Richmond Upon Thames	51.47°N 00.24°W	TQ2276
Barnes Cray	Bexley	51.45°N 00.18°E	TQ5275
Barnes Hall	Sheffield	53.45°N 01.50°W	SK3395
Barnes Street	Kent	51.20°N 00.34°E	TQ6448
Barnet (Chipping Barnet)	Greater London	51.64°N 00.20°W	TQ2495
Barnetby le Wold	North Lincolnshire	53.56°N 00.41°W	TA0509
Barnet Gate	Barnet	51.64°N 00.25°W	TQ2195
Barnettbrook	Worcestershire	52.38°N 02.17°W	SO8876
Barnett Brook	Cheshire	52.99°N 02.56°W	SJ6244
Barney	Norfolk	52.84°N 00.95°E	TF9932
Barnfield	Bedfordshire	51.19°N 00.74°E	TQ9247
Barnfields	Herefordshire	52.07°N 02.80°W	SO4542
Barnfields	Staffordshire	53.09°N 02.04°W	SJ9755
Barnham	West Sussex	50.82°N 00.63°W	SU9604
Barnham	Suffolk	52.37°N 00.74°E	TL8779
Barnham Broom	Norfolk	52.62°N 01.05°E	TG0707
Barnhead	Angus	56.70°N 02.55°W	NO6657
Barnhill	Cheshire	53.08°N 02.77°W	SJ4854
Barnhill	Perth and Kinross	56.38°N 03.42°W	NO1222
Barnhill	City of Dundee	56.46°N 02.86°W	NO4731
Barningham	Suffolk	52.34°N 00.87°E	TL9676
Barningham	Durham	54.48°N 01.87°W	NZ0810
Barningham Green	Norfolk	52.85°N 01.14°E	TG1233
Barnluasgan	Argyll and Bute	56.06°N 05.56°W	NR7891
Barnmoor Green	Warwickshire	52.27°N 01.73°W	SP1864
Barnoldby le Beck	North East Lincolnshire	53.50°N 00.14°W	TA2303
Barnoldswick	Lancashire	53.91°N 02.19°W	SD8746
Barnoldswick	North Yorkshire	54.13°N 02.52°W	SD6671
Barns	Scottish Borders	55.63°N 03.25°W	NT2139
Barnsbury	Camden	51.54°N 00.12°W	TQ3084
Barnsdale	Rutland	52.67°N 00.67°W	SK9009
Barns Green	West Sussex	51.03°N 00.40°W	TQ1227
Barnside	Kirklees	53.54°N 01.74°W	SE1705
Barnsley	Shropshire	52.53°N 02.37°W	SO7593
Barnsley	Gloucestershire	51.74°N 01.90°W	SP0705
Barnsley	South Yorkshire	53.54°N 01.48°W	SE3406
Barns Ness	East Lothian	55.97°N 02.43°W	NT731753
Barnsole	Kent	51.25°N 01.25°E	TR2756
Barnstaple	Devon	51.07°N 04.05°W	SS5633
Barnston	Essex	51.84°N 00.37°E	TL6419
Barnston	Wirral	53.33°N 03.08°W	SJ2883
Barnstone	Nottinghamshire	52.90°N 00.91°W	SK7335
Barnt Green	Worcestershire	52.35°N 02.00°W	SP0073
Barnton	Cheshire	53.27°N 02.55°W	SJ6375
Barnton	City of Edinburgh	55.96°N 03.29°W	NT1975
Barnwell	Northamptonshire	52.44°N 00.47°W	TL0484
Barnwood	Gloucestershire	51.86°N 02.21°W	SO8518
Barnyards	Fife	56.20°N 02.83°W	NO4802
Barons' Cross	Herefordshire	52.21°N 02.77°W	SO4758
Barr	Somerset	51.00°N 03.15°W	ST1924
Barr	South Ayrshire	55.21°N 04.72°W	NX2794
Barra	Western Isles	56.99°N 07.47°W	NF674025
Barrachan	Dumfries and Galloway	54.80°N 04.55°W	NX3649
Barrachnie	City of Glasgow	55.85°N 04.14°W	NS6664
Barrack Hill	City of Newport	51.59°N 03.01°W	ST3089
Barraglom	Western Isles	58.20°N 06.83°W	NB1634
Barra Head	Western Isles	56.77°N 07.63°W	NL557792
Barrahormid	Argyll and Bute	55.98°N 05.67°W	NR7183
Barran	Argyll and Bute	56.37°N 05.43°W	NM8825
Barrapol	Argyll and Bute	56.47°N 06.95°W	NL9542
Barras	Cumbria	54.50°N 02.24°W	NY8412
Barrasford	Northumberland	55.05°N 02.14°W	NY9173
Barr Common	Walsall	52.58°N 01.92°W	SP0599
Barregarrow	Isle of Man	54.25°N 04.58°W	SC3287
Barrel of Butter	Orkney Islands	58.89°N 03.13°W	HY349011
Barrets Green	Cheshire	53.12°N 02.62°W	SJ5859
Barrhead	East Renfrewshire	55.79°N 04.39°W	NS5058
Barrhill	South Ayrshire	55.10°N 04.77°W	NX2382
Barri / Barry	The Vale Of Glamorgan	51.40°N 03.28°W	ST1168
Barrington	Somerset	50.95°N 02.88°W	ST3818
Barrington	Cambridgeshire	52.12°N 00.02°E	TL3949
Barripper	Cornwall	50.19°N 05.32°W	SW6338
Barrmill	North Ayrshire	55.72°N 04.61°W	NS3651
Barrock	Highland	58.62°N 03.29°W	ND2571
Barrow	Somerset	51.16°N 02.64°W	ST5541
Barrow	Suffolk	52.23°N 00.57°E	TL7663
Barrow	Gloucestershire	51.91°N 02.17°W	SO8824
Barrow	Lancashire	53.83°N 02.41°W	SD7338
Barrow	Rotherham, South Yorkshire	53.47°N 01.44°W	SK3798
Barrow	Rutland	52.72°N 00.68°W	SK8915
Barrow	Shropshire	52.59°N 02.51°W	SJ6500
Barroway Drove	Norfolk	52.60°N 00.30°E	TF5603
Barrow Bridge	Bolton	53.59°N 02.48°W	SD6811
Barrow Burn	Northumberland	55.38°N 02.22°W	NT8610
Barrowby	Lincolnshire	52.91°N 00.69°W	SK8836
Barrowcliff	North Yorkshire	54.28°N 00.43°W	TA0289
Barrow Common	North Somerset	51.40°N 02.66°W	ST5467
Barrowden	Rutland	52.59°N 00.61°W	SK9400
Barrowford	Lancashire	53.84°N 02.22°W	SD8539
Barrow Green	Kent	51.33°N 00.79°E	TQ9563
Barrow Gurney	North Somerset	51.40°N 02.67°W	ST5367
Barrow Hann	North Lincolnshire	53.68°N 00.36°W	TA0822
Barrow Haven	North Lincolnshire	53.68°N 00.39°W	TA0622
Barrowhill	Kent	51.09°N 00.99°E	TR1037
Barrow Hill	Dorset	50.76°N 02.07°W	SY9596
Barrow Hill	Derbyshire	53.27°N 01.38°W	SK4175
Barrow-in-Furness	Cumbria	54.11°N 03.24°W	SD1969
Barrowmore Estate	Cheshire	53.21°N 02.79°W	SJ4769
Barrow Nook	Lancashire	53.51°N 02.84°W	SD4402
Barrows Green	Cumbria	54.28°N 02.73°W	SD5288
Barrow's Green	Cheshire	53.37°N 02.72°W	SJ5287
Barrows Green	Nottinghamshire	53.06°N 01.32°W	SK4552
Barrows Green	Cheshire	53.11°N 02.46°W	SJ6958
Barrow Street	Wiltshire	51.06°N 02.24°W	ST8330
Barrow upon Humber	North Lincolnshire	53.66°N 00.38°W	TA0720
Barrow upon Soar	Leicestershire	52.74°N 01.15°W	SK5717
Barrow upon Trent	Derbyshire	52.84°N 01.48°W	SK3528
Barrow Vale	Bath and North East Somerset	51.33°N 02.51°W	ST6460
Barrow Wake	Gloucestershire	51.83°N 02.11°W	SO9215
Barry	The Vale Of Glamorgan	51.40°N 03.28°W	ST1168
Barry	Angus	56.49°N 02.76°W	NO5334
Barry Dock	The Vale Of Glamorgan	51.40°N 03.28°W	ST1168
Barry Island	The Vale Of Glamorgan	51.38°N 03.28°W	ST1166
Barsby	Leicestershire	52.69°N 00.98°W	SK6911
Barsham	Norfolk	52.87°N 0.83°E	TF9133
Barsham	Suffolk	52.44°N 01.51°E	TM3989
Barshare	East Ayrshire	55.44°N 04.26°W	NS5719
Barsloisnoch	Argyll and Bute	56.09°N 05.52°W	NR8195
Barstable	Essex	51.56°N 00.46°E	TQ7188
Barston	Solihull	52.39°N 01.70°W	SP2078
Bartestree	Herefordshire	52.06°N 02.64°W	SO5641
Barthol Chapel	Aberdeenshire	57.39°N 02.31°W	NJ8134
Bartholomew Green	Essex	51.86°N 00.49°E	TL7221
Barthomley	Cheshire	53.06°N 02.35°W	SJ7652
Bartley	Hampshire	50.91°N 01.57°W	SU3013
Bartley Green	Birmingham	52.43°N 01.98°W	SP0182
Bartlow	Cambridgeshire	52.08°N 00.30°E	TL5845
Barton	Cambridgeshire	52.17°N 00.04°E	TL4055
Barton	Cheshire	53.08°N 02.83°W	SJ4454
Barton	Devon	50.49°N 03.55°W	SX9067
Barton (near Naunton)	Gloucestershire	51.92°N 01.87°W	SP0925
Barton (Gloucester)	Gloucestershire	51.85°N 02.23°W	SO8417
Barton	Isle of Wight	50.69°N 01.29°W	SZ5089
Barton (Preston)	Lancashire	53.82°N 02.74°W	SD5137
Barton (Downholland)	Lancashire	53.57°N 02.98°W	SD3509
Barton	North Yorkshire	54.46°N 01.64°W	NZ2308
Barton	Oxfordshire	51.75°N 01.20°W	SP5507
Barton	Somerset	51.30°N 02.87°W	ST3956
Barton	Warwickshire	52.15°N 01.85°W	SP1051
Barton Abbey	Oxfordshire	51.91°N 01.34°W	SP4524
Barton Bendish	Norfolk	52.61°N 00.52°E	TF7105
Barton Court	Herefordshire	52.05°N 02.38°W	SO7440
Barton End	Gloucestershire	51.67°N 02.23°W	ST8497
Barton Gate	Devon	51.15°N 03.88°W	SS6841
Barton Gate	Staffordshire	52.76°N 01.74°W	SK1719
Barton Green	Staffordshire	52.75°N 01.73°W	SK1818
Barton Hartshorn	Buckinghamshire	51.97°N 01.06°W	SP6431
Barton Hill	City of Bristol	51.44°N 02.57°W	ST6072
Barton Hill	North Yorkshire	54.06°N 00.93°W	SE7064
Barton in Fabis	Nottinghamshire	52.88°N 01.22°W	SK5232
Barton in the Beans	Leicestershire	52.65°N 01.42°W	SK3906
Barton-le-Clay	Bedfordshire	51.96°N 00.42°W	TL0831
Barton-le-Street	North Yorkshire	54.15°N 00.89°W	SE7274
Barton-le-Willows	North Yorkshire	54.05°N 00.91°W	SE7163
Barton Mills	Suffolk	52.32°N 00.50°E	TL7173
Barton on Sea	Hampshire	50.73°N 01.67°W	SZ2393
Barton-on-the-Heath	Warwickshire	51.98°N 01.63°W	SP2532
Barton Seagrave	Northamptonshire	52.38°N 00.69°W	SP8977
Bartonsham	Herefordshire	52.04°N 02.71°W	SO5139
Barton Stacey	Hampshire	51.16°N 01.38°W	SU4341
Barton St David	Somerset	51.08°N 02.65°W	ST5432
Barton Town	Devon	51.14°N 03.88°W	SS6840
Barton Turf	Norfolk	52.74°N 01.48°E	TG3522
Barton Turn	Staffordshire	52.75°N 01.70°W	SK2018
Barton-under-Needwood	Staffordshire	52.75°N 01.73°W	SK1818
Barton-Upon-Humber	North Lincolnshire	53.68°N 00.44°W	TA0322
Barton upon Irwell	Trafford	53.46°N 02.36°W	SJ7697
Barton Waterside	North Lincolnshire	53.69°N 00.45°W	TA0223
Barugh	Barnsley	53.56°N 01.53°W	SE3108
Barugh Green	Barnsley	53.55°N 01.53°W	SE3107
Barway	Cambridgeshire	52.35°N 00.25°E	TL5475
Barwell	Leicestershire	52.56°N 01.35°W	SP4497
Barwell	Kingston upon Thames	51.35°N 00.32°W	TQ1763
Barwick	Somerset	50.91°N 02.62°W	ST5613
Barwick	Devon	50.84°N 04.00°W	SS5907
Barwick	Hertfordshire	51.85°N 00.00°E	TL3819
Barwick-in-Elmet	Leeds	53.82°N 01.40°W	SE3937
