= Barwell (disambiguation) =

Barwell may refer to:

- Barwell, village in Leicestershire
  - Barwell F.C., the local football team
- Barwell, London, a small locality in south-west London
- Barwell (surname)
- Barwell (1782 ship)
