= Barrows Green =

Barrows Green may refer to the following locations in England:

- Barrow's Green, Cheshire
- Barrows Green, Cumbria
- Barrows Green, Nottinghamshire
