= Barstable =

Barstable may refer to:

- Barstable, Essex, a location in the United Kingdom
- Barstable (hundred), Essex, England
- Barstable School, Basildon, Essex, England

== See also ==
- Bastable (disambiguation)
- Barnstable (disambiguation)
