= Barnyard (disambiguation) =

A barnyard is a barn adjoining a yard, farmyard in British English.

Barnyard may also refer to:

- Barnyard millet
- Barnyard (film), a 2006 animated film
  - Back at the Barnyard, a 2007-2011 animated series
- Barnyard (video game), a 2006 game based on the film
- The Barnyard, a 1923 film featuring Oliver Hardy
- The Barnyard, University of Minnesota's basketball student section
- Barnyards, Highland in Inverness-shire, Scottish Highlands
- Barnyard Builders, A show about saving aging and possibly decrepit log structures.
