= Battle of Pancsova =

First battle of the Hungarian War of Independence 1848

Coordinates: 44°53′13.7″N 20°37′46.2″E

- Part of the Hungarian Revolution of 1848
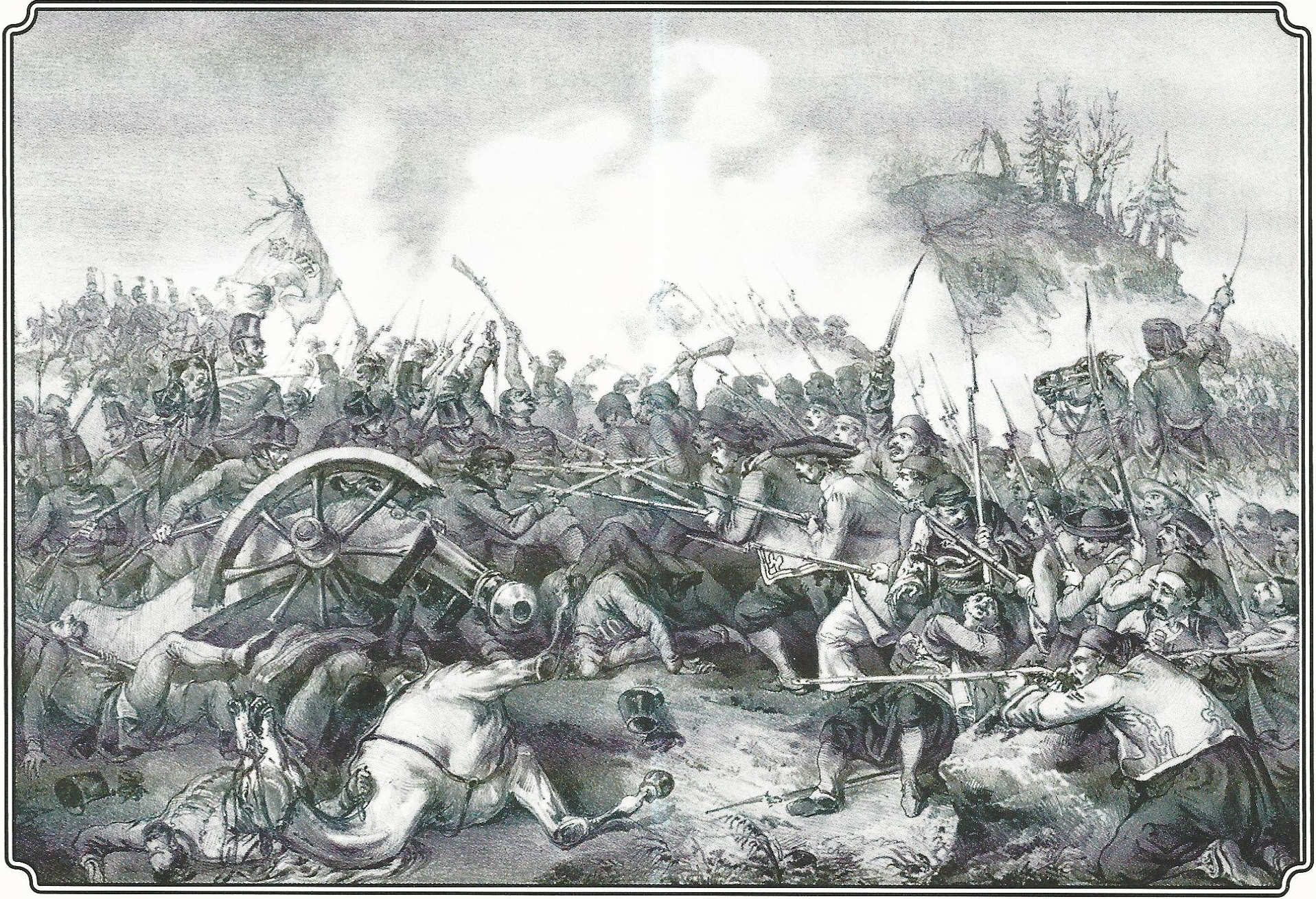
- Battle of Pancsova
Date	2 January 1849
Location	Pancsova, Torontál County, Bánság, Kingdom of Hungary (today Serbia)
Result	Serbian victory

Belligerents
Hungarian Revolutionary Army	Austrian Empire: Serbian Vojvodina

Commanders and leaders
Ernő Kiss; Károly Leiningen-Westerburg	Ferdinand Mayerhofer von Grünhübel; Stevan Knićanin

Strength
4,600 men 900 horses 24 cannons	15,000–17,000 men 34 cannons

Casualties and losses
Total:~300; 59 dead 43 wounded 20–80 captured many frozen during the retreat	6 dead 8 wounded

The Battle of Pancsova (now Pančevo, in the Pančevo municipality in the South Banat District Serbia) was a battle in the Hungarian War of Independence of 1848-1849, fought on 2 January 1849 between the Hungarian Army under the command of Lieutenant General Ernő Kiss against the Serbian insurgents led by Colonel Ferdinand Mayerhofer von Grünhübel. Pancsova was the last important Serbian stronghold in the Bánság/Banat region of Southern Hungary, after the Hungarian victories at Alibunar and Jarkovác. Because of the bad timing of the attack, the insufficient numbers of soldiers, and their clothing inappropriate for the very cold weather, Kiss's army was defeated, and forced to retreat. After this battle, due to the order of the Hungarian National Defense Committee to the troops fighting in southern Hungary, to retreat on the Maros's line, the Serbians occupied the whole Délvidék, and were able to extend their power to most of the territories they claimed to belong to their unilaterally proclaimed Serbian Vojvodina. This situation changed only in March when the Hungarian troops led by Mór Perczel counter-attacked.

== Background ==
The capture of Alibunár and Tomasevác, the two most important fortified camps of the Serbs in the Bánság, turned the situation of the Hungarian army in this region so favorable that, if these results had been quickly and properly exploited, it would not have been difficult to annihilate the resistance of the enemy in Southern Hungary. To this end, according to the historian József Bánlaky, the Hungarians should have immediately turned, without long hesitation, with their victorious army against Pancsova and after the capture of which the conquest of Arad and Temesvár, defended by the Austrian imperial army, would become possible by using all the available forces.

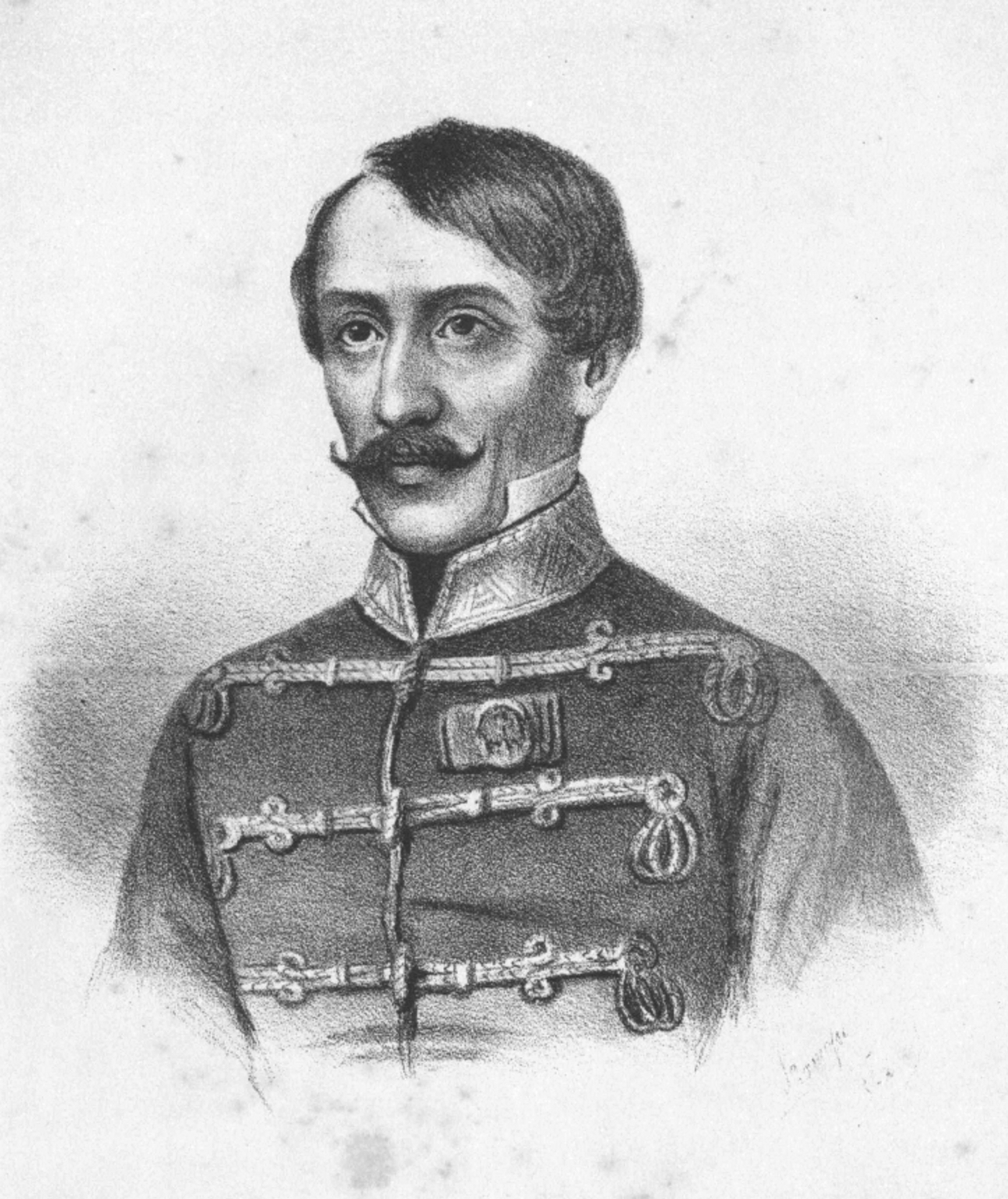
Kiss Ernő 1849

However, General Ernő Kiss, having been informed of the raids of the Temesvár garrison in the Bánság mining district, wanted to attack the aforementioned fortress first, and for this purpose, he conducted an attack to as far as Csákova. Because as a result of the royal manifesto of 3 October, the garrison of Temesvár and Arad sided openly with the Serbs, and subjected the Hungarians to constant attacks. With part of his troops, Kiss moved to repel the attacks of the Temesvár garrison, then planned to defeat the border guards of Krassó and Bánság, and only after then to rush with renewed force to take Pancsova. As part of this operation, Kiss's troops attacked Csákova on 24 December but only managed to capture a few prisoners. At the news of the advance of the Hungarian troops, the imperial troops hastily retreated to Temesvár, to which General Kiss, halting his advance, led his troops back to their camp at Nagybecskerek. In the meantime, Austrian Colonel Stefan Wernhardt captured Németbogsán from Major Lajos Asbóth, and another detachment captured Resicabánya. With this, the Hungarians lost the mining district. Kiss did nothing, however, to reverse the situation, and his troops returned to Nagybecskerek.

After the invasion of Hungary by the main Austrian imperial forces of Field Marshal Alfred I, Prince of Windisch-Grätz, Lajos Kossuth, the president of the Hungarian National Defence Committee on 18 December ordered Ernő Kiss to abandon Versec and Fehértemplom, withdraw with his troops to Szeged, and send his best battalions under Major General Antal Vetter to Pest. Kiss later resisted this order, but in the end, he sent two battalions of the Bánság corps and three of the Bácska corps to Pest.

Afterward, the commanders of the Bánság Corps held a council of war in Zichyfalva. At this meeting, the majority proposed to try to achieve a decisive turnaround in the course of the war in Southern Hungary by capturing Pancsova, the main Serb camp. But Major Károly Leiningen-Westerburg objected that if this attack had not been launched after the Battle of Jarkovác, before the aforementioned battalions were sent to Pest, now it would be risky to do this with the remaining 4 battalions, but he was voted down. In this planned attack János Damjanich, the most successful Hungarian military leader in Southern Hungary could not participate, because he was incapacitated by some kind of rheumatic disease. There were also problems on the opposite side, because Voivode Stevan Šupljikac, the Serbian high commander died on 27 December, or on 15, according to the official death certificate issued by the patriarch Josif Rajačić, and the command of the Austro-Serbian corps was temporarily taken over by the Colonel Ferdinand Mayerhofer von Grünhübel, Austria's consul in Belgrade.

== Prelude ==
Promoted to the rank of Lieutenant General on 22 December Ernő Kiss departed with his army on 31 December in the bitter cold. To secure the flanks of the main troops, two columns were sent from Nagybecskerek and Fehértemplom parallel with The Honvéds, who were inadequately dressed for the very cold climatic conditions were forced to spend the night in the open air. There were 30 or 40 of us lying on top of each other [to keep ourselves warm], until at last, unable to stand the hunger and cold, the battalions rose up and ran to and fro from their resting places, shouting incessantly, causing a terrible noise, until at last Ernő Kiss allowed us to light fires - wrote a soldier to his parents. Nevertheless, the offensive started well: on 1 January, Kiss's army ran into Mayerhofer's troops at Újfalu. The Serbs had superior numbers, but as they joined the battle in separate groups coming one after another, they were defeated in detail, then the Hungarians continued their advance towards Pancsova.

=== Opposing forces ===
The Hungarian army:

- 3rd (White Feathered) Honvéd Battalion: 6 infantry companies;
- 9th (Red Hatted) Honvéd Battalion: 6 infantry companies;
- 24th Honvéd Battalion: 6 infantry companies;
- 28th Honvéd Battalion: 6 infantry companies;
- 3rd Battalion of the 37th Infantry Regiment: 6 infantry companies;
- 2nd Hussar Regiment: 7 cavalry companies;
- 13th Hussar Regiment: 1 cavalry company;
- Artillery: 24 cannons.

Total: 4,600 men, 900 horses, 24 cannons

The Serbian army:

- 4th Pétervárad Border Guards Battalion;
- 5th Pétervárad Border Guards Battalion;
- 6th Pétervárad Border Guards Battalion;
- 3rd Illyrian-Banatian Border Guards Battalion;
- 4th Illyrian-Banatian Border Guards Battalion;
- 4th German-Banatian Border Guards Battalion;
- 5th German-Banatian Border Guards Battalion;
- Pancsova National Guards Battalion;
- Servians (6,000-7,200 soldiers);
- Artillery: 34 cannons.

Total: 15,000-17,000 men, 34 cannons

=== Pancsova and its defense ===
Pancsova had 12,000 inhabitants at the time of the Serbian uprising of 1848/49, and was the final stronghold of the Austro-Serbian army on the eastern section of the theater of war from the Bánság, with a food store, clothing store, cannon foundry, weapon and ammunition store. A steamer was circulating constantly between Pancsova and Belgrade. The city lied in an open, open area. Tall buildings in the innercity were towards the market. The outer perimeter was surrounded by a lined promenade with internal and external ditches. The roads leading out of the town were also flanked by a double alley. The country road leading to Ovča was only usable in dry weather.

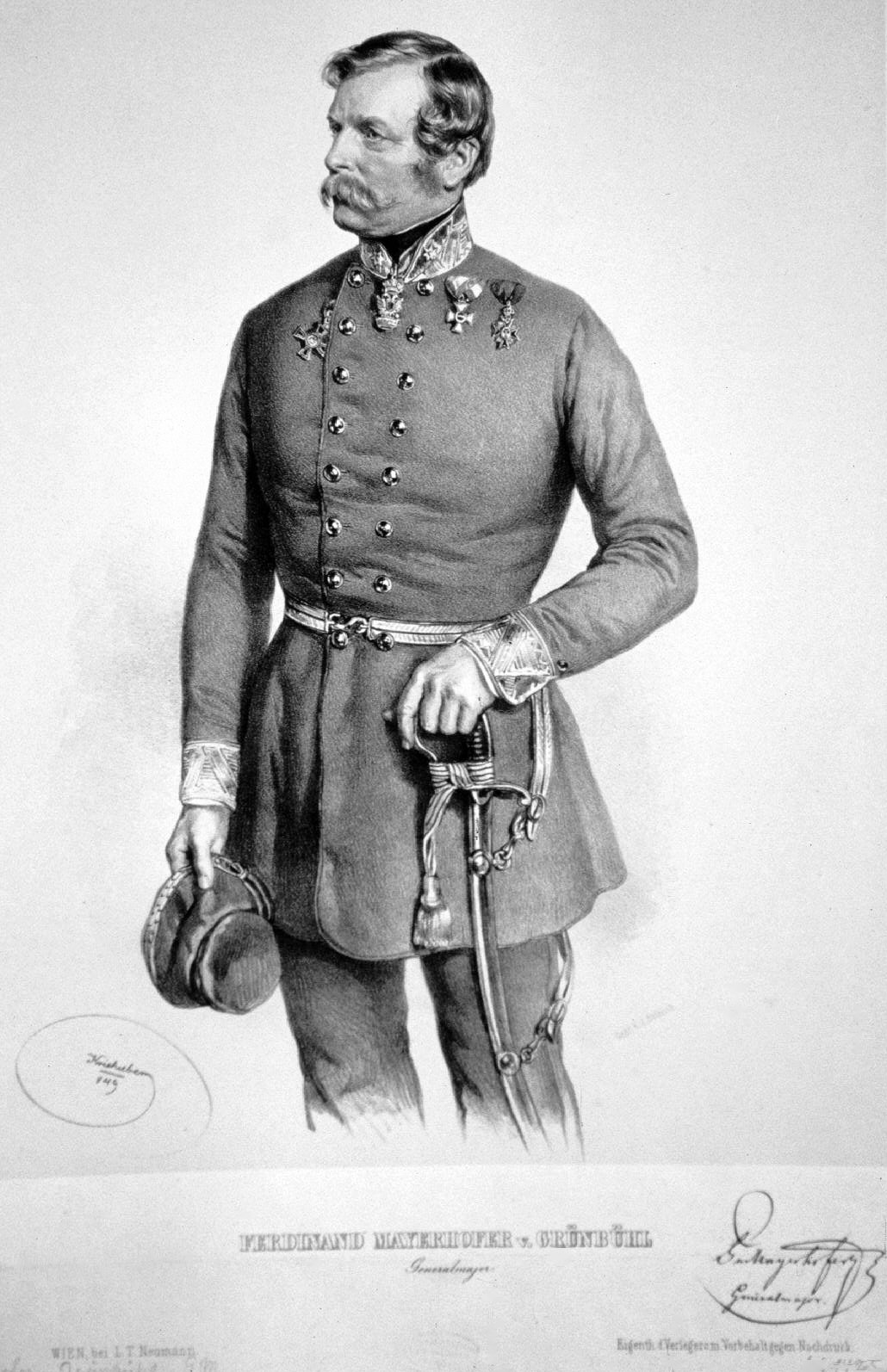
Ferdinand von Mayerhofer

On the eastern edge of the town, where the road to the military shooting gallery led into the forest of Vojlovice - facing the forest - was the military hospital, near the civilian shooting range and the public part. The northern line of the town was 3-600 paces long. Between the road to Jabuka and the Temes River - from Pancsova to Jabuka stretched vineyards for a distance of 3600 paces. This frontline was the actual, 6,000 paces long, defense line. More or less parallel to the north-eastern contour of the town, stretching on a distance of about 4,000 paces, run the 50 paces wide, 1–2 m deep muddy and reedy Nadela bara swampy river, on which a stone bridge could be found on the roads leading from Pancsova to Bavaniste, Neudorf and Crepaja. Both banks of the Nadela were bordered by vineyards. In the summer of 1848, to fortify Pancsova, the municipal authorities ordered the construction at 5,000 paces distance north from the city, of a new straight defensive rampart with ravelins, equipped with gun emplacements, stretching from the Temes River to the Nadela bara, intersecting the roads to Crepaja and Jabuka. The only gate on this defensive barrier was on the Panchova-Jabuka road. A redoubt was also built 1000 paces behind the defensive line along the Pancsova-Franzfeld road. Defending this long defensive line would have been difficult, so the Serbian army command abandoned the defense of this line and built shorter, interrupted ramparts following the line of the town, all the more so because the Nadela bara was frozen over and had ceased to be a barrier against the attackers. Thus, the roads to Neudorf, Franzfeld and Jabuka and other lines of approach were blocked by entrenchments built directly on the edge of the city. For the defense of Pancsova, the Serbs had 7 border guard battalions, 1 battalion of the Pancsova national guards, 7,200 Servians (volunteers coming from the Principality of Serbia) and 34 guns (15,000-1,7000 men). But the defensive guard also included armed militia from the civilian population, because the authorities only allowed women and children to flee to Belgrade. In contrast, the Hungarian military force (5 battalions, 8 cavalry companies, 24 guns) numbered 4,600 men. ) On the evening of 1 January, Lieutenant-General Kiss received information about the number of enemy troops from a spy.

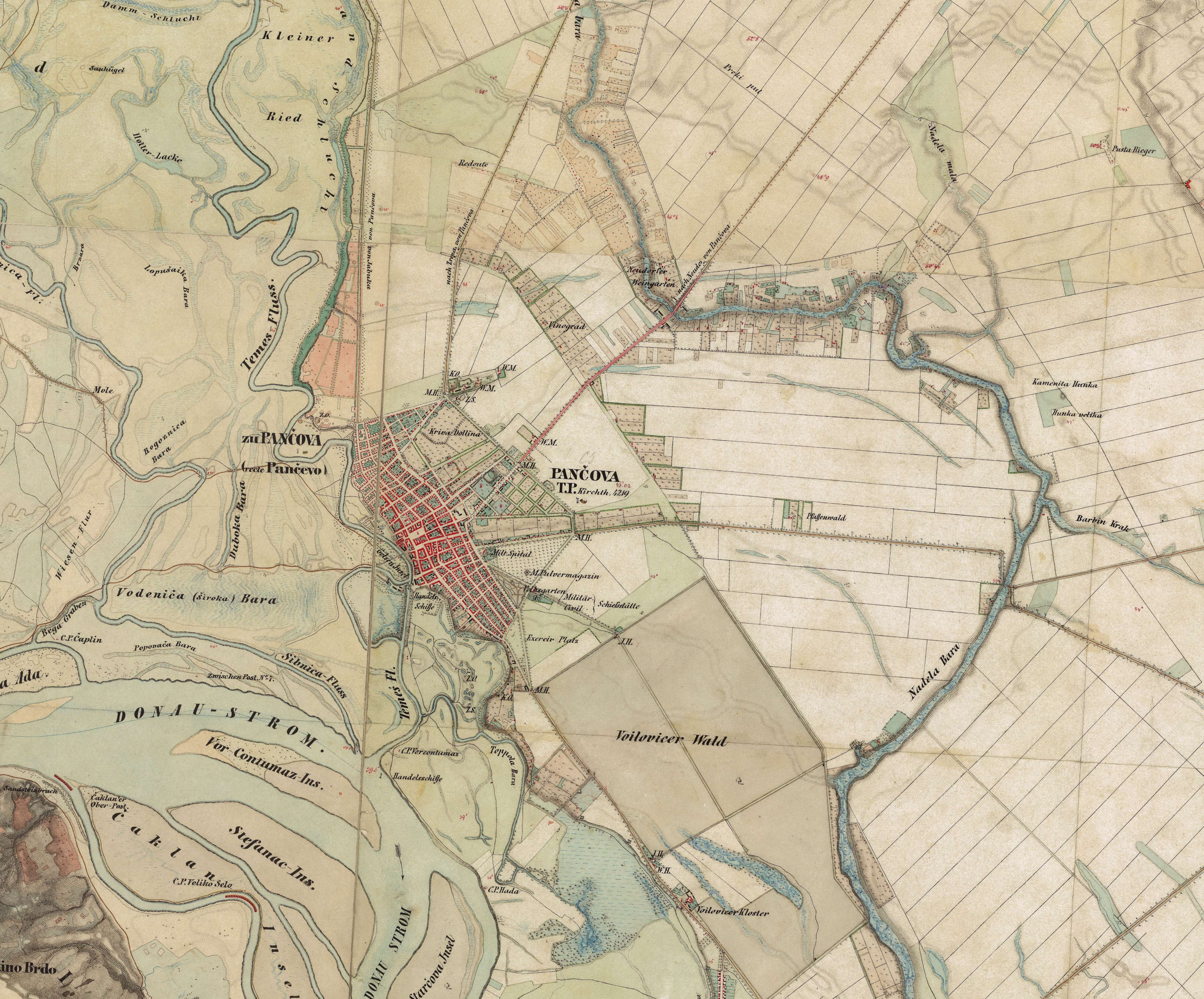
Map of Pancsova (Pancevo) according to the Second Military Survey of the Habsburg Empire (1819-1869)

On 1st January 1849, the advancing Hungarian troops defeated the Serbs in the Battle of Neudorf, however, so demoralized the enemy that Mayerhofer directly proposed abandoning the city and retreating to Transylvania, but he was refused by the council of the officers. The Serbs, preparing for the attack, abandoned the outer line of battlements and occupied the entrenchments directly in front of the city.

As for the organization of the defense, the following measure was taken: the northern and north-eastern borderline of the city was divided into 3 defensive sections; the middle section was the area lying to the right and left of the road to Neudorf - which was defended by the Knicsanin brigade, i.e. the Servians. The line to the right of this, including the military hospital, the public part, and the civilian firing range, will be defended by Captain Scharich with the 2nd Illyrian-Banatian Battalion. The line to the left from Knichanin's defenders, including the roads to Franzfeld and Jabuka as far as the Temes River, was assigned to Captain Kossanić, with 2 battalions of the German-Banatian border guard regiment and 1 squadron of Pétervárad border guards. Three Pétervárad battalions and 6-pounder guns led by Captain Mihajlo Jovanović were assigned to be the reserve, being placed behind the center, where the road from the churchyard to the courtyard of the treasury building met the road to Neudorf. The larger part of the Pancsova National Guard battalion was assigned to the main square. All the guns were used to defend the front line, except the reserve guns.

The Serbs believed that the Hungarians would attack the defensive line from the direction of Neudorf. The reason for this belief was that the Hungarian army camped at Franzfeld, and the shortest line of advance was the Franzfeld-Pancsova road, and it seemed natural that they would deploy for battle on the right and left sides of the road. However, as we shall see, the attack came from a different direction.

== Battle ==
The Hungarian army arrived in front of the town in the morning of 2 January. On the morning of 2 January, a heavy fog enveloped the town of Pancsova and its surroundings. The Serbian command received early reports that the Hungarians had broken through the defensive line and were advancing. The Hungarian army crossed the long defensive line only by the road leading from Jabuka. In order to avoid a massing of the retreating troops in case of an unfavourable outcome of the battle, Károly Leiningen-Westerburg built two bridges on one of the deep trenches of the outer rampart line.

Informed that the Hungarians were not coming from the direction he had expected, Mayerhofer sent 1 of the Pétervárad border guards battalions from the general reserve to the Újfalu frontline, initially assigned to Knićanin, and the 4th battalion of the German-Banathian border guard regiment to the same area to occupy the ravelin; while he sent Knićanin's brigade from there to occupy the northern edge of the town, where the road leads to Franzfeld. The left flank, from the hook of the road to Jabuka to the Temes River, with the vineyards from there, were occupied by Captain Kossanić with the 3rd Battalion German-Banatian Border Guards Regiment, a squadron of the Pétervárad Border Guards and a squadron of the Pancsova National Guard Battalion. Of the troops not mentioned here, Captain Scharich with 2 battalions was deployed on the right flank, 2 battalions of the Pétervárad border guards with 6 guns were left as general reserve, while the bulk of the Pancsova National Guard battalion, was left probably as a reserve, on the left flank. The guns were placed 4 by 4 in the half-closed redoubts built on the outskirts of the town, and 1 by 1 in the trench of the promenades. Imperial artillerymen had recently been assigned to the Austrian Serb corps, and they were handling the heavy artillery. In the gaps between the cannons in the trenches, sitting, standing, crouching in the gun emplacements, border guards, Servians, national guardsmen and militias from Pancsova were waiting ready to fire at the advancing Hungarians.

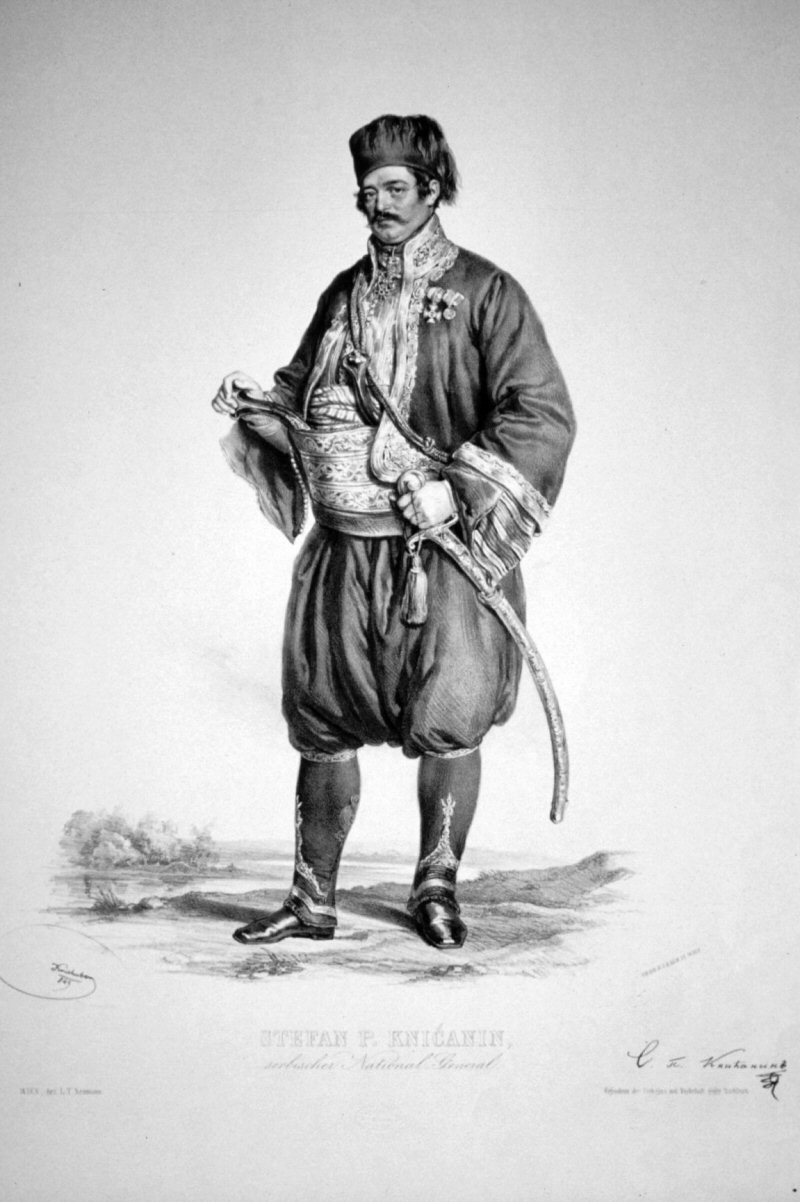
Stephan Knicanin

At 6.30 a.m., from the customs barrier on the road to Jabuka, and from the entrenchment built there, the Serbs saw a chain of Hungarian hussars advancing on the plain towards Pancsova. At 7 a.m., the Hungarian troops already arrived to 1,000 paces from the Serb position.

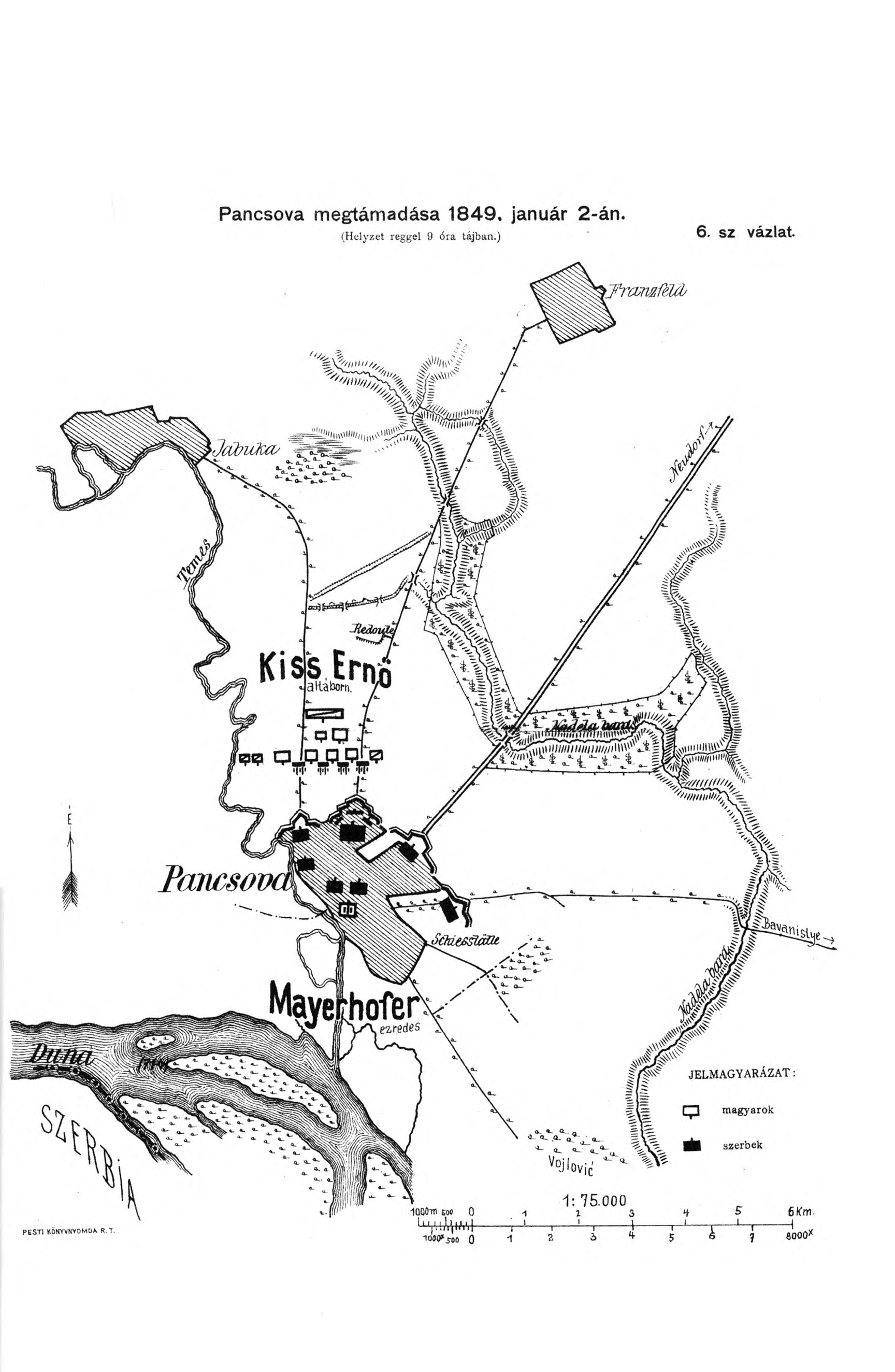
Battle of Pancsova - 2 January 1849

The infantry of the Hungarian army advanced in two battlelines on the eastern side of the Jabuka-Pancsova road, while 1 battalion, 1 hussar squadron, and 4 cannons on the western side of the road, the infantry in the vineyards, the cavalry along the Temes River, against the enemy's left flank Most of the cavalry followed the infantry troops on the eastern side of the Jabuka-Pancsova road as the 3rd line of battle. The artillery advanced on the two flanks and in the spaces between the units.

The fog had lifted completely when the guns of the Hungarian army came within firing range of the Serbs' positions, and the latters greeted the Hungarians with a heavy barrage of their 12-pound cannons.

A fierce cannon firefight ensued from both sides. The Serbs were superior in terms of the number and caliber of their guns, and if they had fired better, the Hungarians would have suffered heavy losses.

During the extended gun battle, the Hungarian battalion advancing on the right flank in the vineyards made two attacks on the Serb left flank, but to no avail, as the troops on the eastern side of the road were waiting for the order to attack.

The right wing made an unsuccessful attack on the Serbian left wing which was defending the vineyards, while the artillery shelled the town for three hours, setting several houses on fire. The artillery had already fired two-thirds of its ammunition when Major Leiningen-Westerburg warned Ernő Kiss: either the troops must charge or retreat, because the soldiers would not stand the fire of the Serbian infantry and artillery in the open field for long. The army was also impatient, some soldiers of the 9th (Red Hatted) Battalion were already pointing their guns at Kiss. As usual, Kiss was perplexed, as he felt that the Hungarian artillery was not yet sufficiently prepared for the attack, so he ordered the retreat but in such erratically that part of the army - including the 3rd (White Feathered) Battalion of the Honvéd Army, which was advancing - only learned of the order when they saw the other units retreat. The cavalry and artillery turned at once, and in the greatest disorder, they rushed to the same bridge over which they had crossed the entrenchment, creating chaos there. Fortunately, the other two bridges had been completed by then, and the army could use them. The Serbs, especially Knićanin's Servians, pursued the retreating troops vigorously along the Franzfeld road, but without any serious success. During the retreat, the Serbs attempted several times to outflank the retreating Hungarian troops.

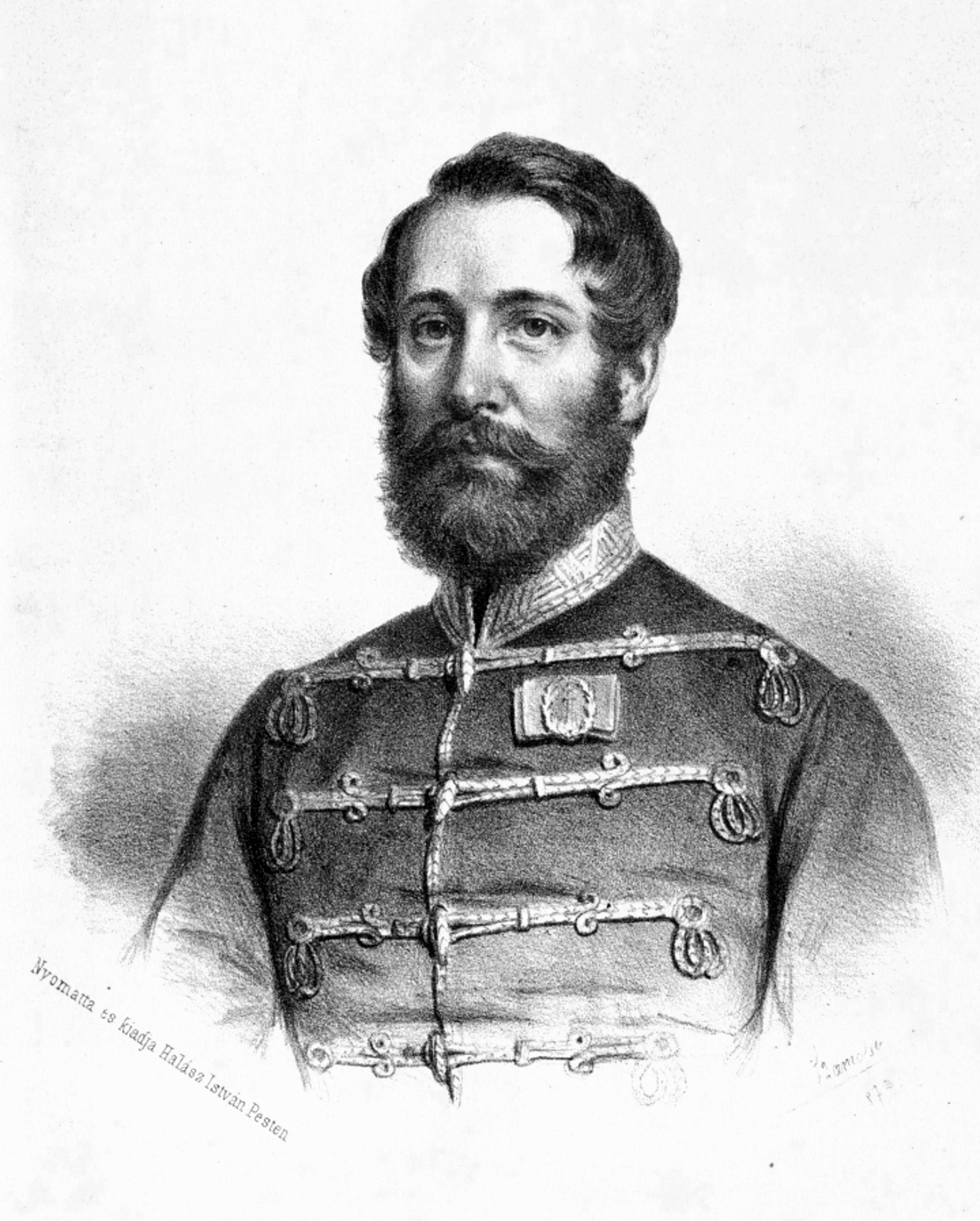
Leiningen-Westerburg Lithogr. by Károly Szamossy

The Hungarian artillery retreated beyond the long defensive line, and in order to cover the infantry's retreat, began firing at the attacking Servians. With the support of artillery, the infantry's order was restored. The infantry of the Hungarian army, - although the Servians had reached the left flank of their 2nd line and had opened heavy rifle fire against it, and even doubled their fire by bringing forward their guns, - retreated in the greatest order under the excellent leadership of the gallant Captain Ferenc Aschermann. The 9th Battalion retreated in the utmost order, and although several cannonballs struck the battalion's mass, they did not panic, encouraging each other by shouting "Don't be afraid, Hungarian". Of the infantry troops, only the battalion on the right flank suffered greater losses than the 9th, fighting among the vines, and its retreat was made dangerous by the fact that the Serbs, who were rapidly advancing, could cut it off from the main troop.

Here, the Serb troops of Captains Kossanović and Jovanović pushed the retreating battalion.

East of Jabuka, about 600-700 paces from the first bend of the Jabuka-Panchova road, was the Jabuka forest. Although Major Leiningen urged Lieutenant-Colonel József Nagyándor Major Kiss Pál, to try to stop the pursuit at this favorable defensive position, the Hungarians failed to take position here. The Serbs did not advance on the Jabuka road but headed straight for the edge of the forest.

The Honvéd battalion, fighting on the right flank in the vineyards, retreated in disorder as far as the Jabuka forest; but under its cover it regrouped; and when Knicsanin's troops advanced west of the forest, and Captain Stefanović with two six-pounder guns east of the forest, the Hungarian infantry troops were already beyond Nadela, near the Jabuka-Franzfeld road, and were heading for Franzfeld. Stefanović then brought his guns to the Pancsova-Franzfeld road and from there he fired on the retreating Hungarians.

At Franzfeld, Lieutenant General Ernő Kiss wanted to take up a position with some troops against the pursuing Serbs. He ordered Major Leiningen to occupy the vineyards southwest of Franzfeld with a battery and 2 companies of cavalry. As a column of the Serbs had already advanced along the Pancsova-Újfalu road and threatened the retreat way of the troops in the vineyards of Franzfeld, Lieutenant-General Kiss ordered him to abandon this position and to withdraw without interruption as far as Petrovo selo, while Leiningen, with the battery and two companies of cavalry assigned to him, was to cover the Pancsova-Újfalu road. When the night fell, the Serbs gave up the chase.

The two flanking columns which were advancing from Nagybecskerek and Fehértemplom also retreated, without directly contributing to the battle. They probably had no orders to do so, as their mission was to secure the main column against flanking operations. The course of events proves that it was a mistake not to attach these two separate columns to the main column, and not to unite all available forces for this important enterprise.

== Aftermath ==
The Hungarian corps reached Petrovo Selo in a more or less orderly manner, but here all order broke down. From here the retreat continued to Alibunar and then to Zichyfalva, and dozens of exhausted soldiers froze to death on the way. The 9th Battalion alone lost 30 soldiers, and another 40 soldiers had their hands, feet, noses or ears frozen. To go all day, all night, without a morsel of food, in the most bitter cold, in the most desperate march, after two sleepless nights and three days of such strenuous marching - that would ruin anyone, wrote the already quoted Hungarian soldier. Although the attack was made with battle-hardened troops, the retreat demoralized them almost completely. The attack, carried out at the wrong time and with the wrong forces, also fundamentally compromised the earlier results. Consequently, on 5 January, Colonels Damjanich, József Nagysándor, and Rudics, at the request of the army, requested Government Commissioner Sebő Vukovics to call on Ernő Kiss to resign from command, which he did, and János Damjanich, who had been appointed General, took over the command.

According to their own records, the Serbs lost 6 dead and 8 wounded. The Hungarians lost only a few men in the battle, 59 dead and 43 wounded at Pancsova; but many died in the terrible cold. According to one Serbian account, the number of Hungarians killed and frozen was 800. But the moral loss was all the greater. The battered troops of the Hungarian army marched partly to Nagybecskerek and partly to Versec.

As a result of this battle, the Serbian forces avoided disaster, all the more so because the Hungarian army corps in Bánság soon received the decision of the Military Council from Pest of 2 January 1849, according to which the Hungarian troops had to evacuate the Délvidék (Southern Province) until the Maros line and march to the Central Tisza region. Thus, by mid-January the Serbs had already launched an offensive, and by early February they had occupied the counties evacuated by Hungarian troops. Only the fortress of Pétervárad and its environs, Szabadka, and its environs remained in the hands of the Hungarian troops.

== Sources ==
- Bánlaky, József (2001). A magyar nemzet hadtörténelme ("The Military History of the Hungarian Nation) (in Hungarian). Budapest: Arcanum Adatbázis.
- Bóna, Gábor (1987). Tábornokok és törzstisztek a szabadságharcban 1848–49 ("Generals and Staff Officers in the War of Freedom 1848–1849") (in Hungarian). Budapest: Zrínyi Katonai Kiadó. p. 430. ISBN 963-326-343-3.
- Hermann, Róbert (2001), 1848-1849 a szabadságharc hadtörténete ("Military History of 1848-1849") (in Hungarian), Budapest: Korona, ISBN 963-9376-21-3
- Hermann, Róbert (2004). Az 1848–1849-es szabadságharc nagy csatái ("Great battles of the Hungarian Revolution of 1848-1849") (in Hungarian). Budapest: Zrínyi. p. 408. ISBN 963-327-367-6.
- Olchváry, Ödön (1999). A magyar függetlenségi harc 1848-1849-ben a Délvidéken (in Hungarian). Budapest: Márkus Samu Könyvnyomdája.
