= James William Wild =

British architect (1814–1892)

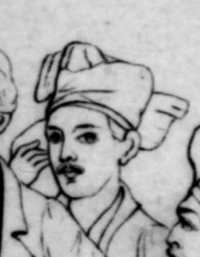
- Wild at the start of the Lepsius expedition in Egypt, 1842. Drawing by J.J. Frey.
- Born: 9 March 1814; Lincoln, Lincolnshire, England
- Died: 7 November 1892 (aged 78); Sir John Soane's Museum, London, England
- Occupation: Architect

James William Wild (9 March 1814 – 7 November 1892) was a British architect. Initially working in the Gothic style, he later employed round-arched forms. He spent several years in Egypt. He acted as decorative architect to the Great Exhibition of 1851, and designed the Grimsby Dock Tower, completed in 1852. After a considerable break in his career he worked on designs for the South Kensington Museum, and designed the British embassy in Tehran. He was curator of the Sir John Soane's Museum from 1878 until his death in 1892.

== Early life and career ==
Wild was born in Lincoln, the son of the watercolourist Charles Wild.

Wild was articled to the architect George Basevi from 1830. After his apprenticeship, he concentrated on Gothic design, and was entrusted with the design of a country church. He was subsequently engaged on many other church projects, and six churches had been built to his design before 1840.

== Christ Church, Streatham ==
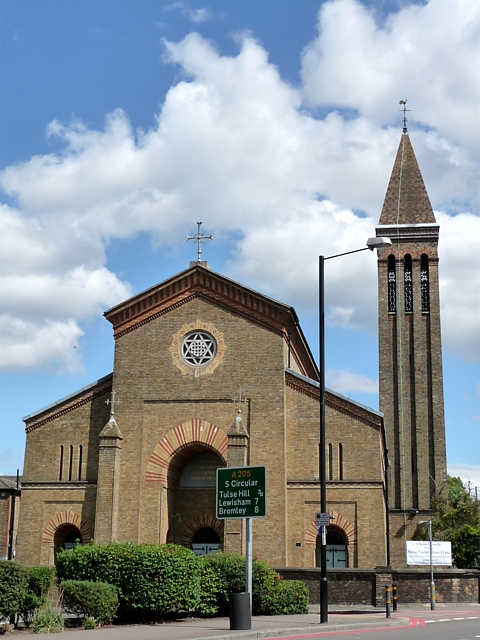
Christ Church, Streatham (1841)

Commissioned to build a new church at Streatham on a limited budget – construction was intended to cost around £4,000 although the expenditure eventually rose to around £6,000 – Wild abandoned the medieval English styles he had used for his earlier churches, for a design in a spare, round-arched style, based on an eclectic range of sources from around the Mediterranean. The church was built of brick, with, unusually for the date, some brick polychrome decoration, although sparingly used. It has a tall slim Italian-style campanile, with a small pyramidal spire. A contemporary reviewer wrote that "it has been called Moorish, Byzantine, Arabian, &c, but we incline to think that it may more justly claim the title of 'Italian' than that Palladian modification which has so long monopolized that title in England."

Wild is not known to have travelled abroad by this time, but in developing this new style he would have been able to draw on the advice of friends who had, such as Owen Jones (who married Wild's sister Isabella shortly after) and Joseph and Ignatius Bonomi He would also have been able to consult recently published sources such as Jones' study of the Alhambra, a building from which some details at Streatham seem directly copied. Another influence was probably the Basilica of San Zeno, Verona. Wild showed the design for Christ Church at the Royal Academy in 1840, along with another for a church at Paddington (which was never built), in a Lombardic style, with western tower and a central cupola.

In July 1841 Wild built a temporary pavilion seating 2,850 at Liverpool for the "Grand Dinner of the Royal Agricultural Society".

== Egypt ==
In 1842 he went to Egypt to work as an architectural draughtsman for the Egyptologist Karl Richard Lepsius, having obtained the job through Joseph Bonomi. He left Lepsius' employment in 1844, but remained in Cairo for several years, making drawings of Islamic architecture, in which he paid particular attention to details of domestic buildings. Owen Jones later used Wild's drawings as the sole source for the chapter on Arabian design in his Grammar of Ornament, and nine of Wild's sketchbooks from this period are now in the collection of the Victoria and Albert Museum. While in Cairo he also drew up plans for a burial ground for the city's British community, which were never carried out, and in 1845 was commissioned to build the Anglican church of St Mark in Alexandria, following the rejection of a Gothic design by Anthony Salvin. Wild's church design combined features from early Christian and Islamic styles. It was completed – without its planned campanile – in 1854.

== Return to Britain ==
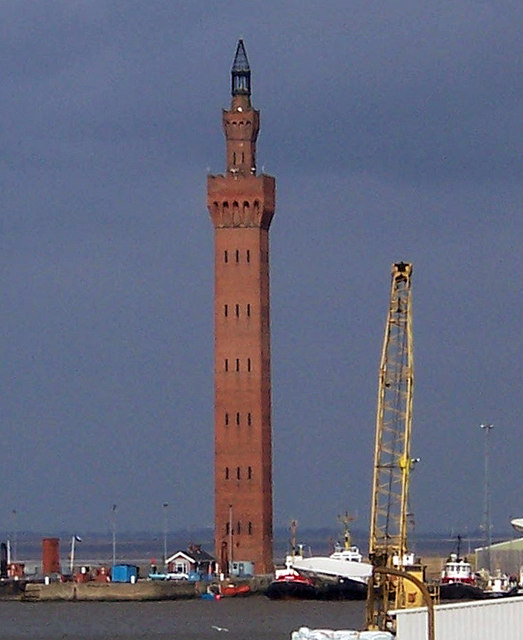
Grimsby Dock Tower (1852)

Wild returned to Britain in 1848, having travelled via Constantinople, Italy and Spain. During the erection of Paxton's Crystal Palace for the Great Exhibition in Hyde Park in 1851 he was appointed "decorative architect", his brother-in-law Owen Jones holding the post of superintendent of works. According to some sources, from 1851 he was "retained as an expert on Arabian art" to advise the newly established museum of the Department of Practical Art at Marlborough House, which later moved to South Kensington and eventually became the Victoria and Albert Museum. One well-informed obituary, however, dates this appointment to much later. In 1852 he designed a water tower at Grimsby, a side-project of the Museum's director, Henry Cole, modelling it after the tower of the Palazzo Publico in Siena.

== South Kensington ==
The next 14 years of Wild's career remain obscure, and it appears that his professional activities were limited by illness, his only recorded design work during this time being a stained-glass window for the South Kensington Museum's Oriental Court, the interiors of which were designed by Owen Jones. In 1867, following the death of Francis Fowke, Lieutenant-Colonel Henry Scott was appointed to oversee the development of the 1851 Exhibition Commissioners' estate in South Kensington, which included the museum, and Wild emerged as his principal architectural assistant. His exact contribution to the scheme is not clear, although he is known to have designed the museum's Cast Court, and seems to have had sole responsibility under Scott for the Eastern and Western Galleries, and for the museum's branch at Bethnal Green, where he designed a new brick structure to be constructed around prefabricated elements previously erected at South Kensington. The works at South Kensington employed a hybrid round-arched style, often referred to by the German term rundbogenstil.

In 1869 Wild drew up designs for chancery buildings for the British Embassy at Alexandria and for the British legation at Tehran. Only the latter was built, completed in 1876. His supervising assistant in Tehran was Caspar Purdon Clarke, one of the South Kensington architectural staff, who also, in 1872, went to Alexandria to oversee the mural decorations at Wild's church there.

== Later life ==
Wild was curator of the Sir John Soane's Museum in London from 1878 to his death in 1892. He made substantial changes to the galleries at the rear of the Soane Museum to improve daylighting, but many of these have since been reversed, as more recent restorations have tried to bring the museum closer to its appearance in Soane's day.

His extensive manuscripts, including drawings from his travels, are now housed in the Griffith Institute of the University of Oxford. The Victoria and Albert Museum also holds a selection of sketches by Wild.

== Works ==
- All Saints, Botley, Eastleigh, Hampshire. (1836).
- St James, West End, Hampshire (begun 1836). Demolished and replaced 1890.
- St. John, Moulsham, Chelmsford, Essex (plans approved between 1835 and 1838 )
- Holy Trinity, Blackheath Hill, Greenwich (1839; a design was exhibited at the Royal Academy, 1838; demolished).
- Holy Trinity, Coates, Cambridgeshire (1839).
- St Lawrence, Southampton (1839–42; design exhibited at the Royal Academy, 1839 demolished 1923).
- St Paul, Stapler's Road, Barton, Newport, Isle of Wight (first stone laid 1840).
- Christ Church, Streatham (1841).
- Temporary pavilion at Liverpool for the Royal Agricultural Society (1841).
- St Mark's Anglican church, Alexandria, Egypt (1845–54).
- St Martin in the Fields Northern District Schools, Long Acre, London (1849–50; demolished).
- Grimsby Dock Tower (1851–2).
- Various works at South Kensington, including the Cast Court, and East and West Galleries of the South Kensington Museum and the interior planning and structure of the Science Schools (later the Henry Cole Wing of the Victoria and Albert Museum), including the north staircase.
- Bethnal Green Museum (now the Museum of Childhood).
- British Legation, Tehran (1876).
- Arab Studio, at his own house, 18 Aberdeen Place, Maida Hill.

The church of St Mary and St Cuthbert at Barton, Yorkshire, sometimes attributed to Wild, is by Joseph Bonomi.
