= Barnstable =

Barnstable may refer to:

== Places ==
=== United States ===
- Barnstable, Massachusetts, a town
- Barnstable (village), Massachusetts, a village within the town of Barnstable
- Barnstable County, Massachusetts, a county that contains the town of Barnstable, and that is roughly coterminous with Cape Cod
- Barnstable Municipal Airport, on Cape Cod
- Barnstable station in the town of Barnstable, Massachusetts

=== England ===
- Barnstable, an obsolete spelling of Barnstaple, a town in Devon
- Barnstable Hundred, sometimes used for Barstable Hundred, an ancient subdivision of the county of Essex

== Other uses ==
- Barnstable (film), a 1963 Australian TV play
- Dale Barnstable (1925–2019), American basketball player
- The Barnstable twins, actresses Patricia and Priscilla "Cyb" Barnstable, who portrayed the Doublemint Twins in the 1970s, daughters of Dale Barnstable

== See also ==
- Barnstable Bay (disambiguation)
- Barnstaple (disambiguation)
- Bastable (disambiguation)
