= St Paul's Church, Newport, Isle of Wight =

Church on the Isle of Wight, England

Coordinates: 50°42′10″N 01°17′05″W

St Paul's Church, Newport
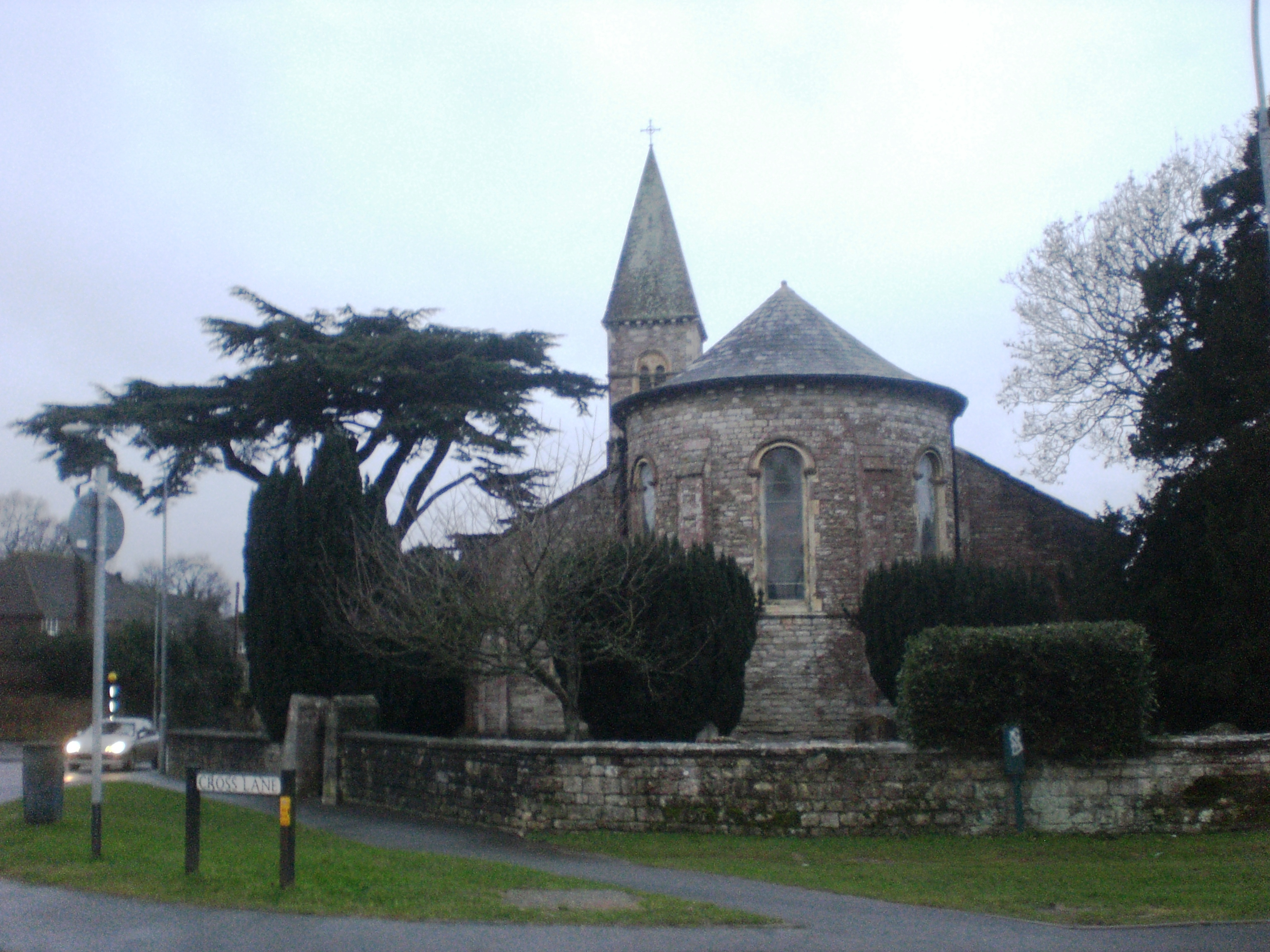
- St Paul's Church, Newport
- St Paul's Church, Newport
- Denomination: Church of England
- Churchmanship: Conservative Evangelical
- Website: www.stpaulsbarton.co.uk

History
- Dedication: St Paul

Administration
- Province: Canterbury
- Diocese: Portsmouth
- Parish: Barton, Isle of Wight

Clergy
- Vicar: Rev Dozie Moneme

St Paul's Church, Newport is a parish church in the Church of England located in Barton, Isle of Wight and Newport, Isle of Wight, United Kingdom. The church is Grade II listed.

== History ==
The church dates from 1844. It was designed by the architect James William Wild and is sited on Staplers Road in Barton, Newport.

St Paul's was originally a district church in the parish of Whippingham, although serving the Barton area of Newport.

It was built in a neo-Norman in style, with north and south aisles, an apse; there is a tower and spire at the west end of the south aisle. It was intended to accommodate 800 worshippers, including 200 free seats.

The land was given by C. W. Martin and the church was consecrated on 1 February 1844.

== List of incumbents ==
- Revd W.D. Parker 1844 – 1853
- Revd W.L. Sharpe 1854 - 1890
- Revd W.H. Nutter 1891 – 1909
- Revd C. Collis 1910 - 1915
- Revd M. Atkinson 1915 – 1937
- Revd A.G. Kelsey 1937 - 1946
- Revd L.J.D. Wheatley 1946 - 1963
- Revd W. Boardman 1963 - 1986
- Revd A. Andrews 1986 – 1989
- Revd Chris Lane 1990 - 1995
- Revd Dr. Peter Pimentel 1996 - 2014

== Stained Glass ==
There is a stained glass window by Charles Eamer Kempe.

== War Memorials ==
Two plaques within the church record the local Servicemen who fell during World Wars I and World War II.

== Churchyard and 'old' Cemetery ==
The churchyard surrounds the church building.

In 1871 the St. Paul's (Barton) Burial Board was formed to establish a civic cemetery as there was little room left for burials in the churchyard. The civic cemetery was established on land north of the churchyard and the first burial took place there in August 1872. By 1897, space was running out in the civic cemetery and the St. Paul's (Barton) Joint Burial Committee (by then under Newport Town and Whippingham Parish Councils) purchased an area of ground off Halberry Lane for a new civic cemetery.

=== Burials ===
- Rev William Henry Nutter, 1909, Vicar of St Paul's for 19 years - in civic cemetery
- Professor John Milne 1913 - in civic cemetery
- Rev Miles Atkinson, 1937, Vicar of St Paul's for 22 years
