= Geoff Hamilton =

English gardener (1936–1996)

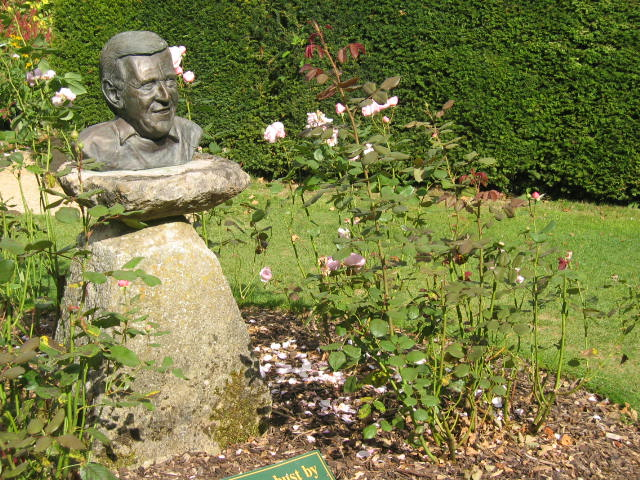
- Bust of Hamilton in his garden
- Born: 15 August 1936; Stepney, London, England
- Died: 4 August 1996 (aged 59); Merthyr Tydfil, Wales
- Education: Writtle Agricultural College
- Employer: BBC
- Notable work: Gardeners' World
- Spouse: Lynda
- Children: 3

Geoffrey Stephen Hamilton (15 August 1936 – 4 August 1996) was an English gardener, broadcaster and author, best known as presenter of BBC television's Gardeners' World in the 1980s and 1990s.

== Background ==
Hamilton was born just a few minutes before his twin brother Tony, in Stepney, London. His family moved to Broxbourne in Hertfordshire when he was two, and his interest in horticulture was nurtured initially by working on the family's back garden. He expanded his knowledge still further by helping out at local nurseries during the school holidays – mainly at the Van Hage nursery at the end of his road. He went on to Writtle Agricultural College in Essex where, in 1959, he passed the National Diploma in Horticulture with distinction.

After graduating from agricultural college he became a nurseryman and self-employed landscape gardener, then opened his own garden centre ("The Hamilton Garden Centre") on the outskirts of Kettering in Northamptonshire. He began writing a column for Garden News in 1970, and in 1975 became a full-time journalist when he took over as editor of Practical Gardening magazine, where he began his campaign to inform everybody about the joys and benefits of organic gardening.

== Television and Barnsdale ==
Hamilton made his television debut in 1970, presenting Gardening Diary for Anglia TV, which led to guest appearances on BBC1's Gardeners' World. From 1979 until his death, he was the programme's regular and longest-serving presenter. In 1985, he moved the programme's filming location to his own garden at Barnsdale, Oakham, Rutland, where one of his protégés was Adam Frost, who later became a co-presenter of Gardeners' World. He also created several other BBC gardening series, including The Cottage Garden, The Paradise Garden and The Ornamental Kitchen Garden. Hamilton wrote or co-wrote a number of books to accompany his television series (see below).

Hamilton's practical, hands-on experience, down-to-earth and cost-conscious approach to gardening, willingness to share his failures as well as his successes, and gentle humour were among the factors contributing to his popularity. He was an early and influential advocate of organic gardening, helping to challenge the widespread perception that organic gardening was unconventional or eccentric.

Readers of Amateur Gardening nominated Hamilton as Gardener of the Millennium. Despite his achievements and popularity, he received no award or formal recognition from the Royal Horticultural Society. He was, however, awarded an honorary Master of Science degree by Anglia Polytechnic University in 1994.

== Death and legacy ==
Hamilton suffered a heart attack in 1995, and took three months off work to recuperate. He died after suffering a heart attack on a charity bike ride near Merthyr Tydfil, Wales, in August 1996.

His garden at Barnsdale, consisting of 38 themed gardens over 8 acres (3.2 ha), remains open to the public and is run by his son Nick Hamilton (also an organic gardener and writer). A charity, Geoff Hamilton's New Gardeners' Foundation, was set up to provide a bursary of £4,000 for students of any age and level studying practical horticulture at Writtle College. This award is funded by donations and sales of gardening DVDs.

== Bibliography ==
Written or co-authored by Hamilton

- Do Your Own Garden Stonework (W Foulsham & Company Limited, 1986)
- The Living Garden (BBC books, 1992)
- Geoff Hamilton's Cottage Gardens (BBC books, 1995)
- The Ornamental Kitchen Garden (BBC books, 1995)
- Search, Gay. Old Garden, New Gardener (BBC books, 1995)
- Search, Gay. The Complete First Time Gardener (BBC books, 1996)
- Geoff Hamilton's Paradise Gardens (BBC books, 1997)
- Clevely, A. & Hamilton, L. Geoff Hamilton's Year in Your Garden (Headline Book Publishing, 1998)
- "Gardeners' World" Practical Gardening Course (BBC books, 2000)
- Organic Gardening (Dorling Kindersley, 2008)

About Hamilton

- Search, Gay & Hamilton, Tony. Geoff Hamilton: A Man and His Garden (BBC books, 1998)
- Hamilton, Tony. Geoff Hamilton: The Complete Gardener (Headline Book Publishing, 2000)
- Hamilton, Tony. My Brother Geoff: The People's Gardener (Headline Book publishing, 2001)
- Hamilton, Nick & Sue. Geoff Hamilton: A Gardening Legend (2006)
