= Barnstaple (disambiguation) =

Barnstaple is a town in Devon, England.

Barnstaple may also refer to:

- Barnstaple (hundred)
- Barnstaple (UK Parliament constituency)
- Barnstaple railway station
- HMS Barnstaple (1919), a minesweeper in World War I
- Barnstaple Town F.C., Barnstaple's football club

== See also ==
- Barnstable (disambiguation)
