= Grimsby Dock Tower =

Hydraulic accumulator tower and maritime landmark in North East Lincolnshire, England

Coordinates: 53.5831°N 0.0703°W

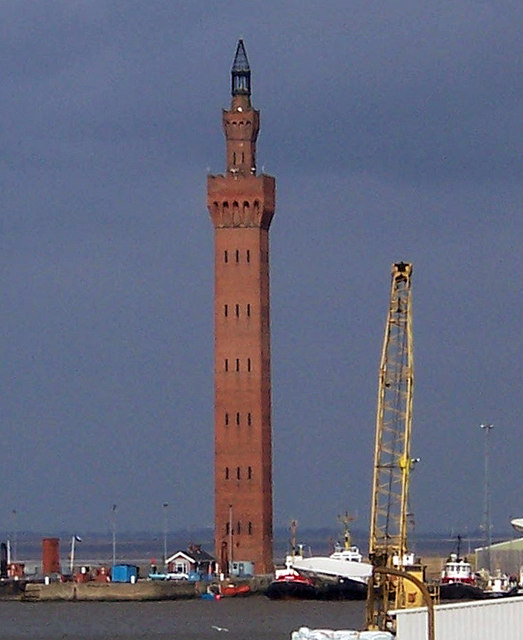
Grimsby Dock Tower

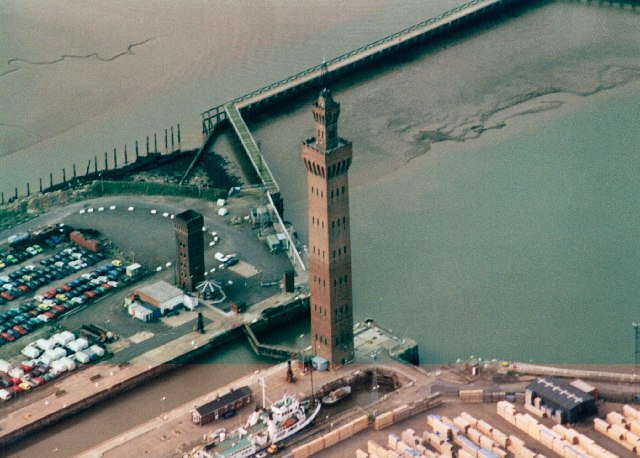
Aerial view

Grimsby Dock Tower is a hydraulic accumulator tower and a maritime landmark at the entrance to the Royal Dock, Grimsby, in North East Lincolnshire, England. It was completed on 27 March 1852, based on William Armstrong's idea of the hydraulic accumulator, with the purpose of containing a 30,000-imperial-gallon (140,000 L) reservoir at a height of 200 feet (61 m), that was used to provide hydraulic power to power the machinery of the Grimsby Docks. The extreme height of the tower was necessary to achieve sufficient pressure, and as a result of this, the tower can be seen for several miles around, even far inland on the north bank of the Humber estuary in villages such as Patrington.

== History and design ==
The tower was built to provide water pressure to power the hydraulic machinery (for cranes, lock gates and sluices) at the Grimsby Docks. The tower was built to carry a tank 200 feet (61 m) above the ground with a direct feed into the machinery. Small pumps topped up the tank as the hydraulic machinery drew off water. The tower system was brought into use in 1852 working the machinery of the lock gates, dry-docks and fifteen quayside cranes, and also to supply fresh water to ships and the dwelling houses on the dock premises. The water was obtained from a well, 15 ft (4.6 m) in diameter and 47 ft (14 m) deep, with a boring of 5 in (130 mm) in diameter to the chalk rock in the centre, situated near to where the Grimsby Evening Telegraph has its present offices. The well was also fed by seven borings of 5 in (130 mm) in diameter, at intervals in a length of 300 ft (91 m), which discharged into the well by a brick culvert 3 ft (0.91 m) in diameter.

Water was conveyed from the well to the tower in a cast-iron pipe thirteen inches in diameter when it was then forced into the tank by two force pumps, each of ten inches in diameter, worked by a duplicate, horizontal engine of twenty-five horse power. All the engines, pumps and pipes and the whole of the machinery were made by Mr Mitchell of the Perran Foundry, Cornwall.

During the building of the tower, Armstrong developed another system using weighted accumulators, which at once was found to have great advantages. The working hydraulic pressure was greater, permitting more compact and cheaper machinery and everything was at ground level. The first such installation was at New Holland dock and pier, actually brought into use more than a year before the Grimsby system.

=== Architectural design, construction and opening ===
The tower was designed by James William Wild who based its appearance on that of the Torre del Mangia on the Palazzo Pubblico in Siena. It was built under the supervision of J. M. Rendel, who was the civil engineer in charge of construction of the Royal Dock.

The ground floor of the tower was lined with pink, white and blue drapery when Queen Victoria came with Prince Albert to visit the dock and 'open' the tower in October 1854. Her Majesty gave permission for Prince Albert, the Prince of Wales and the Princess Royal to accompany Rendel in the hydraulic lift to the gallery running around the tower above the water tank, from which a clear view of Grimsby, Cleethorpes and the mouth of the Humber estuary is obtained.

The tower is 309 feet (94 m) high, 28 feet (8.5 m) wide at the base, and tapers gradually to 26 feet (7.9 m) below the first projection; its walls are 4 feet (1.2 m) thick and narrow to 3 feet (0.91 m) at the string course under the corbels. The bricks of this plain brick tower were made from clay obtained from excavations in the marsh adjoining the docks, and are set in blue lime mortar. Hoop iron bond is used in the walls to a considerable extent. The foundation of the tower is a solid masonry wall built upon a timber bearer piling. Approximately one million bricks were used in its construction.

Local legend has it that the tower was built on a foundation of cotton wool; the story likely has its origins in the profitable import of cotton to West Yorkshire which gave an impetus to the building of the Royal Dock and the tower.

=== Later use ===
The Dock Tower continued to provide water for hydraulic working until 1892 when the erection of the hydraulic accumulator tower on the opposite pier approximately 200 feet (61 m) to the North West of the Dock Tower took over – water in this structure was pressurised by a 300-tonne weight. Present dock and lock machinery are powered by electric or electro-hydraulic energy.

During the Second World War, there were plans to demolish the tower, as it acted as a beacon for German Luftwaffe aircraft heading towards Liverpool. Later, a plaque was placed on the bricks paying tribute to the minesweeper crews of the war.

The tower's lift is no longer in operation with access to the top via a spiral staircase in one corner of the building. The second balcony is currently used for the transmission and reception of radio signals.

The tower is Grade I listed and is the subject of a Preservation Order.

== Model ==
There is a model of the Grimsby Dock Tower, entirely constructed of Lego, at Legoland in Windsor.

== See also ==
- Joseph Chamberlain Memorial Clock Tower, also based on the Torre del Mangia
- Hydraulic engine house, Bristol Harbour
