= Károly Leiningen-Westerburg =

Hungarian general

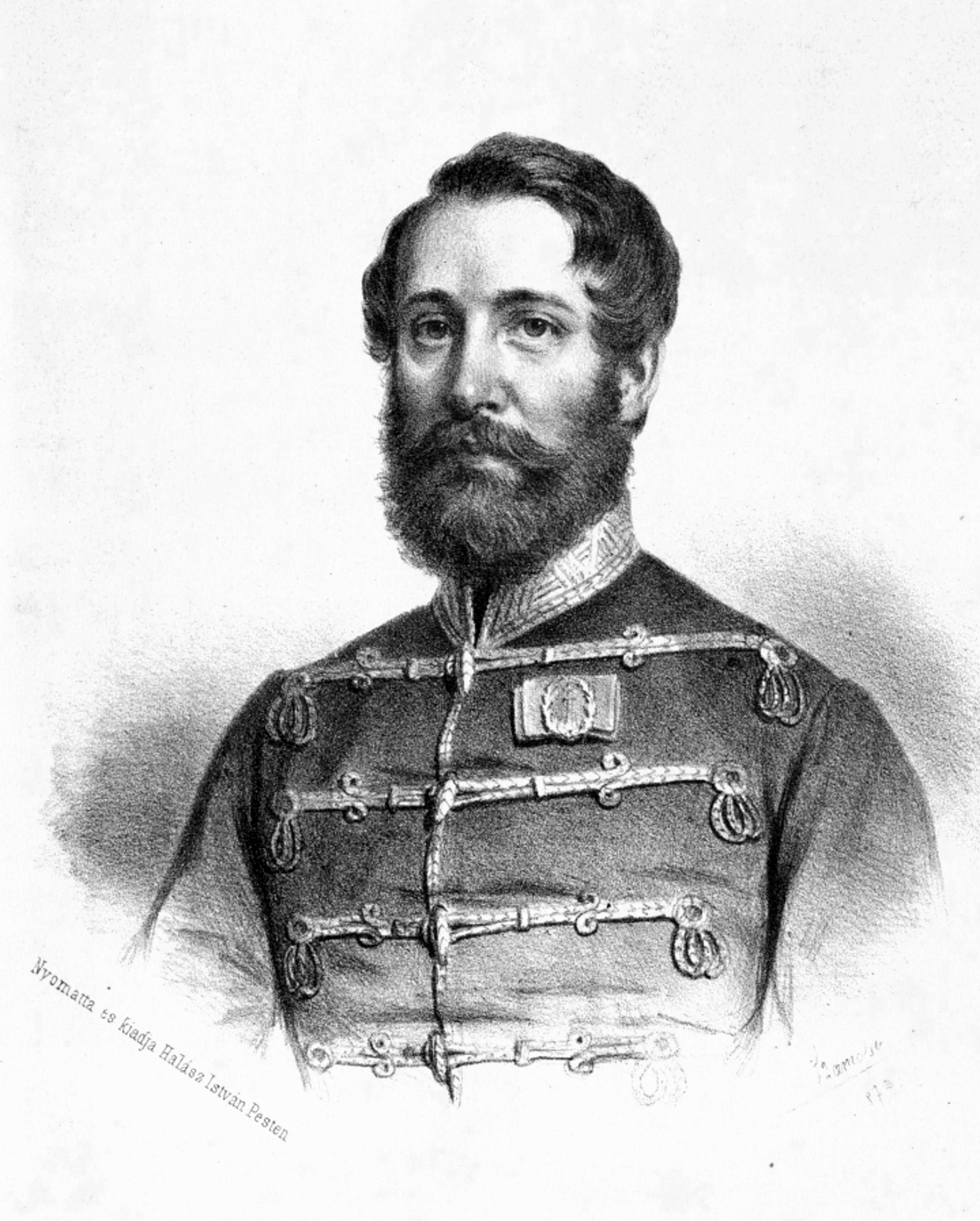
Posthumus portrait of Count Károly von Leiningen-Westerburg by Szamossy Elek (1826–1888)

Károly Leiningen-Westerburg (German: Karl August, Graf zu Leiningen-Westerburg; 11 April 1819, Ilbenstadt (today part of Niddatal, Germany) – 6 October 1849, Arad) was a German honvéd general in the Hungarian Army, and a member of the German House of Leiningen. He was executed for his part in the Hungarian Revolution of 1848, and is considered one of the 13 Martyrs of Arad.

== Early life ==
Count Karl August was born into an ancient noble family in which several members pursued military careers, including his brothers Johann Ludwig (1807–1864), Viktor August (1821–1880), and Georg August (1815–1850), with the Imperial army. His father, Friedrich, Count zu Leiningen-Westerburg (1761–1839), inherited the county of Altleiningen, but had divorced his first wife, Charlotte von Zech und Rautenburg (1777–1841), in 1798 after six years of childless marriage. By the time Count Friedrich remarried Eleonore Maria Magdalena Breitwieser (1781–1841) in 1813 (initially morganatically, whereupon she became created Frau von Brettwitz) he already had several children by her, legitimised by their parents' marriage. Karl, being born after the wedding, was legitimate from birth.

== Life and Martyrdom ==
Count Károly married rich Hungarian noblewoman Erzsébet Sissányi de Törökbecse (1827–1898, of Greek-Aromanian descent) in 1844, thereby becoming proprietor of the large Hungarian estate of Törökbecse. In the autumn of 1848, the Temesvár regiment was mobilized, and Károly volunteered for the campaign waged against the Serbs. By December 1848 he had become a major, was promoted to lieutenant colonel in March 1849, and to colonel in April. He acquired more renown during the spring campaign and was promoted to the rank of general on July 1. Discharged on July 2, along with Louis Benedict Szőny, he joined the Hungarian uprising.

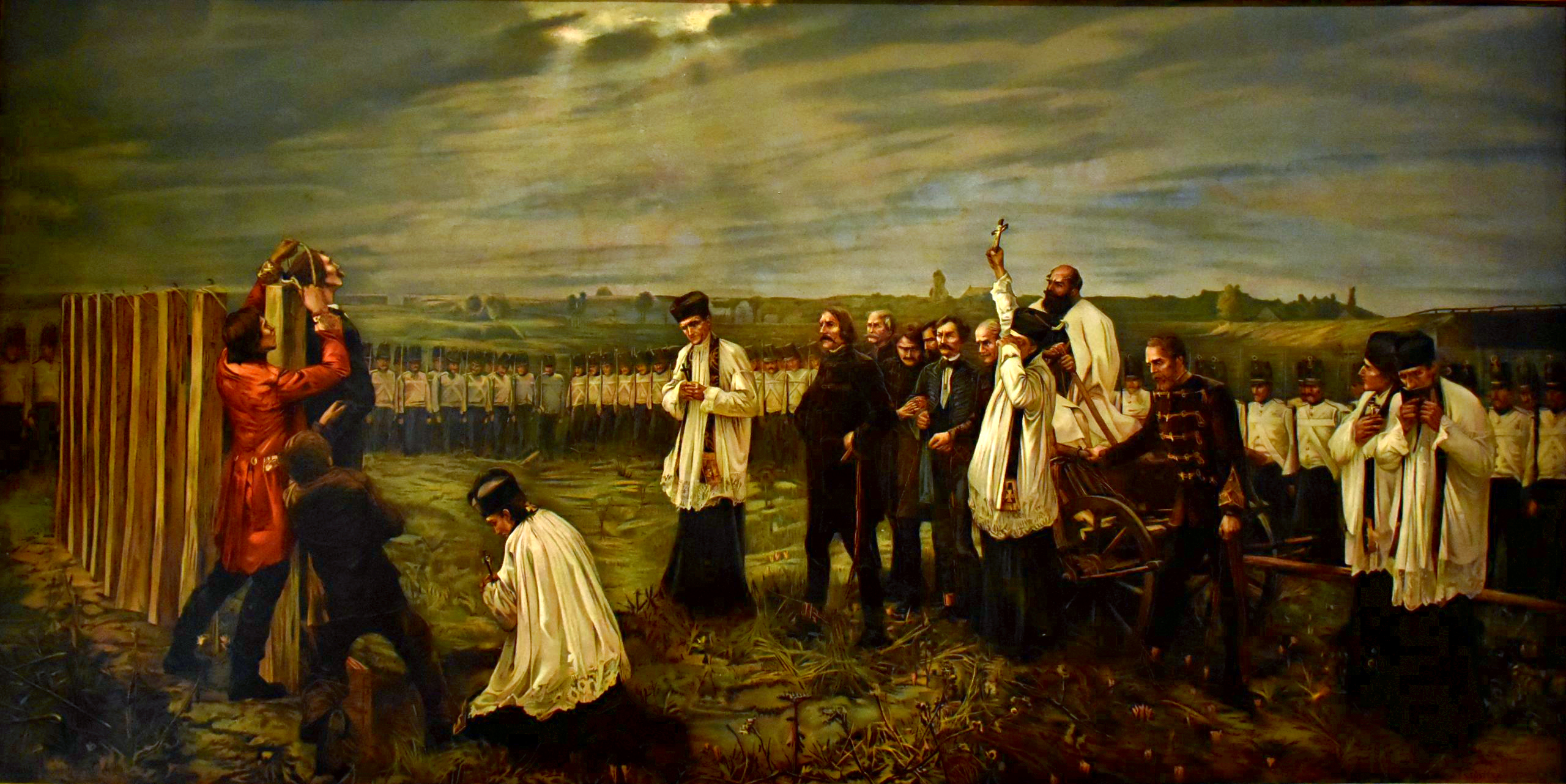
Execution of the Martyrs of Arad by János Thorma.

Before the final defeat, he successfully repulsed a number of attacks. He was captured and sentenced to death by hanging. His last recorded words were: "I have only just learned the tidings blared by the newspapers...I have no documents with which to refute any incident, but I have faith that at the last God's skies will open before all -- and when I come before the throne of God's eternal judgment -- these allegations of me shall be solemnly denounced as low slander." His death by hanging was carried out along with the rest of the partisans.

== Family ==
His wife bore him two children:

- Elisabeth "Liza" Victoria Constanze Friederike Eleonore of Leiningen-Westerburg-Altleiningen (1844–1913), who became the wife of the British general William Barwell-Barwell, and from whom Lilien († 1894), Henriette and her child Richard were born.
- Armin Casimir Hermann of Leiningen-Westerburg-Altleiningen (July 11, 1848 – December 1900), who served in the Royal Hungarian army, but due to health issues retired at the rank of captain. After that, he took a position in Titel, Ministerial Commissioner for the Tisza-Danube Belvizszabályozó Society. He published his father's diary and correspondence. His body was moved to its final resting place in 1903 in Titel.

Károly's widow Erzsébet remarried in 1854 and with her second husband, Count József Bethlen de Bethlen (1824–1896), bore four more children (István, Béla, Miklós, Anna).

In 1911 a statue to Károly's heroism and martyrdom was erected in Törökbecse.

In 1999 a bilingual memorial tablet was erected at his birthplace in the monastery/castle in Niddatal-Ilbenstadt by the Association of Hungarian Organizations in Germany (Bund Ungarischer Organisationen in Deutschland e.V. - BUOD).
