= All Saints, Botley =

Coordinates: 50.9143°N 1.2738°W

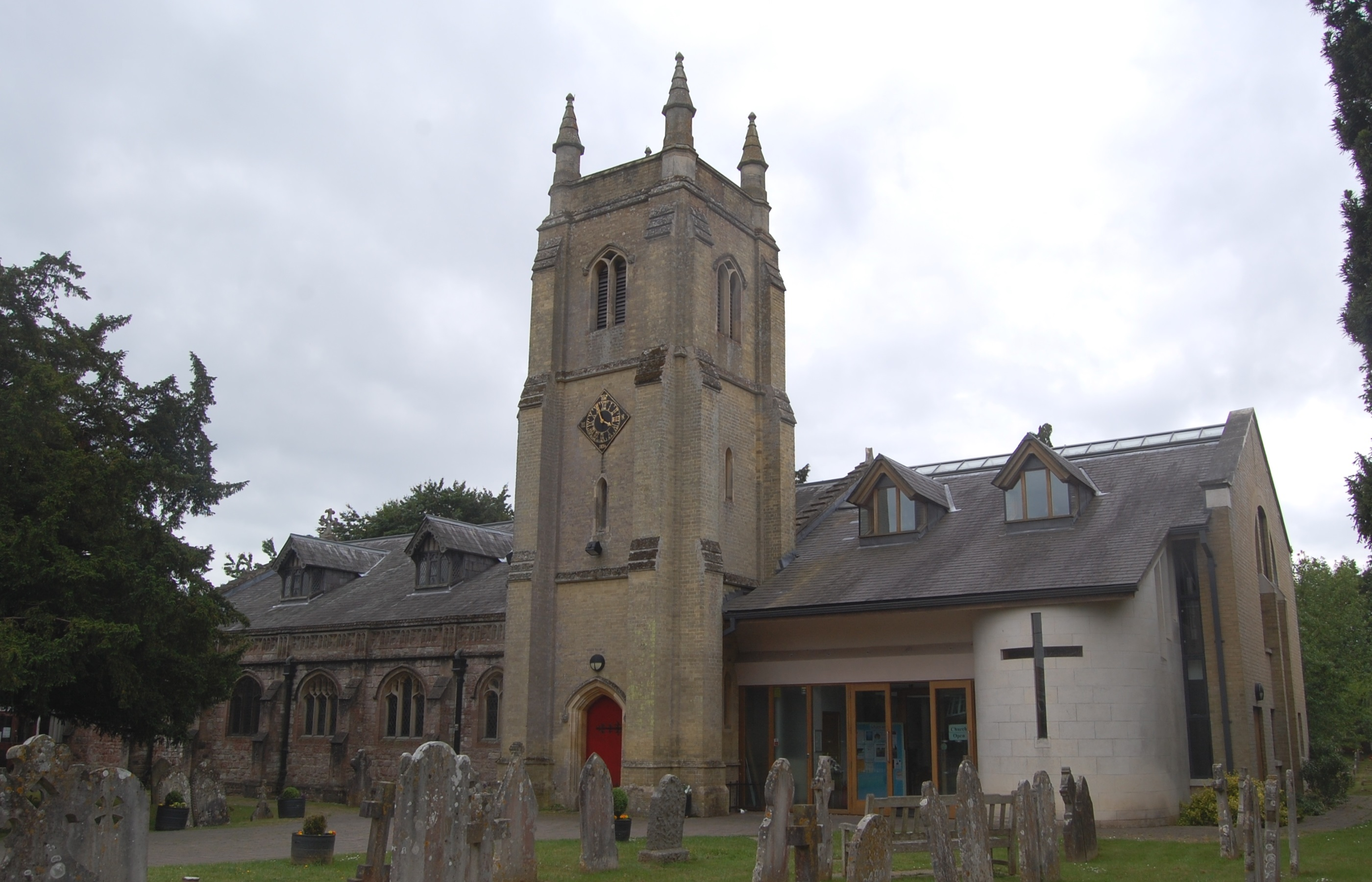
- All Saints Church, High Street, Botley (May 2019)
- All Saints, Botley
- OS grid reference: SU 51158 13005
- Location: Botley, Hampshire, SO30 2EA
- Country: England
- Denomination: Church of England
- Website: https://www.bcd-churches.org.uk/

History
- Dedicated: 1836

Architecture
- Heritage designation: Grade II
- Architect: James William Wild
- Style: Gothic Revival
- Years built: 1836 (present)

Administration
- Diocese: Portsmouth
- Parish: Botley

Clergy
- Rector: Gregg Mensingh

All Saints is an Anglican church in the centre of the village of Botley, in Hampshire, England. Built in the 1830s to replace a church, St Bartholomew's, south of the village, it was expanded in 1859 and the 1890s. Further expansion followed in 1967 and in the early 2000s. Described as "an uninteresting specimen of its time", it is a Grade II listed building.

== History ==
Following the partial destruction of St Bartholomew's in the early 1830s, a replacement church, dedicated to All Saints, was constructed between 1835 and 1836 as a result of a petition to the Bishop of Winchester and much fund-raising. The parcel of land on which the church is built was given by James Warner (Snr) and the foundation stone was laid on 11 June 1835. The new church was closer to the centre of the village; parishioners were finding it increasingly troublesome to take the path across the fields to the old church. The yellow-brick Gothic Revival church, designed by James William Wild, was consecrated on 22 August 1836 at a service with a congregation of 700.

The Walker's organ was installed in 1852. The present chancel and choir vestry, by John Colson, were added in 1859.

Further large increases in population made expansion necessary, and Thomas Graham Jackson undertook more work in 1892 and 1895. The north wall was removed and replaced with an arcade supported by oaken pillars on stone bases. A lower outer wall was built of stone crowned by a parapet. This, with the installation of dormer windows to improve the interior lighting, greatly improved the northern aspect of the building by reducing the large area of slated roof visible from the ground. The work was completed and consecrated by the Bishop of Winchester on 25 October 1892. With this increase in seating capacity the gallery across the west end was removed and the access from the tower filled in. A narthex across the west end was added in 1895.

The church room was built in 1967. On 2 October 2006, work began on an extension to the west end of the church. The narthex was removed and foundations laid for a two-storey extension. Funding for this work was provided by a substantial legacy from the Maffey sisters and the fund-raising of parishioners. The extension was completed in 2008.

The church is described as "an uninteresting specimen of its time". Its only ancient features - all retrieved from St Bartholomew's - are the font (12th century, recovered from a field in 1740), a monument (c. 1330) in the south wall, and three bells (dating from c. 1420).
