= Botley, Hampshire =

Village and parish in Hampshire, England

Coordinates: 50°54′52″N 1°16′12″W

Botley
- Village
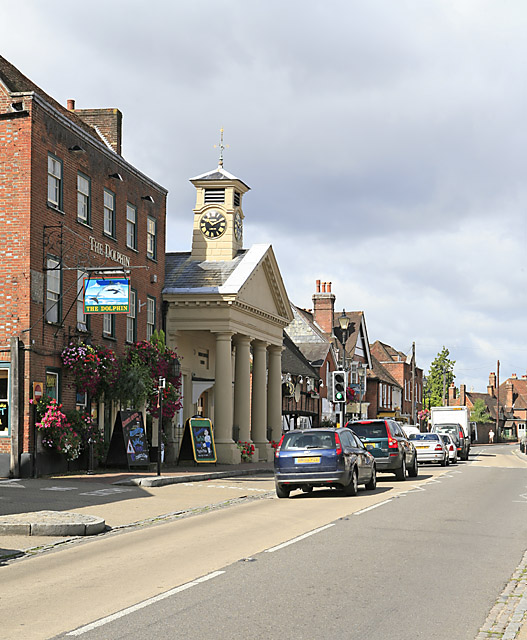
- Botley High Street

- Location within Hampshire
- Population: 5,100 (2011 Census including Long Common)
- OS grid reference: SU520128
- District: Eastleigh
- Shire county: Hampshire
- Region: South East
- Country: England
- Sovereign state: United Kingdom
- Post town: SOUTHAMPTON
- Postcode district: SO30
- Dialling code: 01489
- Police: Hampshire and Isle of Wight
- Fire: Hampshire and Isle of Wight
- Ambulance: South Central
- UK Parliament: Hamble Valley
- Website: https://botley-pc.gov.uk/

Botley is a historic village in Hampshire, England, approximately 3 miles (4.8 km) east of Southampton. It was developed as a natural crossing point for the River Hamble, and received its first market charter from Henry III in 1267. The village grew on the success of its mills, its coaching inns, and more recently strawberries, and was described as "the most delightful village in the world" by 18th century journalist and radical politician William Cobbett.

== History ==
When the Romans built a road from Noviomagus Reginorum (Chichester) to Clausentum (Southampton), it crossed the River Hamble at a natural crossing point located to the south of present-day Botley. The crossing later became the site of Botley's first settlement, which existed at least as far back as the 10th century. Known in Saxon times as "Bottaleah" ("Botta" was probably a person, while "Leah" was the Saxon word for a woodland clearing). Some time prior to the Norman Conquest, a gradual rise in sea level meant that travellers found the river easier to ford further north of the original Roman crossing, this new crossing place provided a new focal point for the village, which in 1086 was listed in the Domesday Book as "Botelie" and included two water-powered mills and had a population of less than 100.

At that time, the mills were owned by the family of Ralph de Mortimer, a French nobleman who fought at the Battle of Hastings in 1066, and remained in the family's possession until 1304 when the manor, including the mills, passed to the order of St Elizabeth of Hungary in Winchester. During the dissolution of the monasteries (1536–1539), the manor and mills were given to Thomas Wriothesly, a commissioner of Henry VIII and later Earl of Southampton. After the third Earl died without a male heir, the manor and mills passed to the Dukes of Portland. From 1838 to 1921, the site was owned by W and J Clarke. As well as grinding and trading cereals, the company traded in coal and, for a short time, manufactured paper. The Botley Flour Milling Company was formed in 1921, and in 1928 it was sold to the current owners, the Appleby family.

In 1267 John of Botley, Lord of the Manor, obtained a royal charter from Henry III for holding an annual fair and weekly market in the town. The village did not, however, grow significantly and in 1665 the village still had a population of only 350.

During the 18th century, Botley functioned as a small inland port with barges transporting coal, grain, timber and flour along the river. The first bridge over the tidal part of the river was built in 1797 and by the time of the 1801 census 614 people were residing in the village.

During the early 19th century, the radical journalist and political reformer William Cobbett lived in Botley and called it "the most delightful village in the world". From 1805, Cobbett lived initially at Botley House near Botley Mills, and then, from 1812, in a smaller house at Botley Hill.

A corn market was opened in 1829 and a cattle market in 1836, while Botley Market Hall – today a Grade II listed building – was built in 1848. A new church, All Saints, was built nearer the village centre in 1836. The National School opened in 1855 and the Recreation Ground was purchased in 1888. In the mid-nineteenth century the climate made south Hampshire ideal for growing strawberries and Botley became the centre for a thriving trade in strawberries. In 1841 Botley railway station was opened by the London and Southampton Railway Company. It became a major loading point for the seasonal strawberry traffic, as Botley formed the start of what is now known as the Strawberry Trail.

== Culture and community ==
As of 2005, the village had a youth centre, recreation ground, and a number of public houses including The Bugle Inn. The village hosted a day-long festival in 2004 to raise money for a local charity, and since 2009 has held a biennial music festival.

== Places of worship ==
Botley has had a place of worship since at least the 11th century.

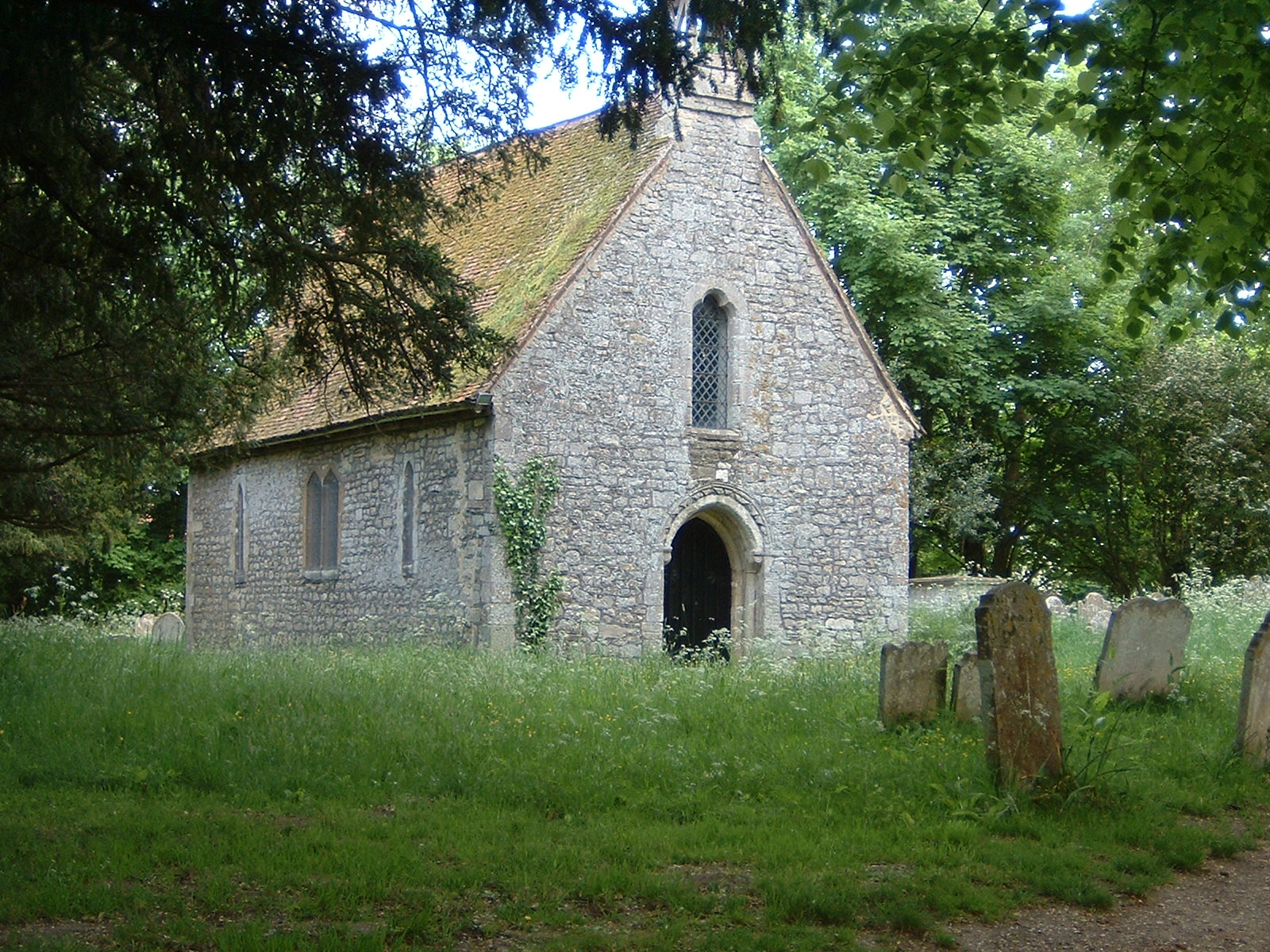
St Bartholomew's Church, Botley

The early church, commonly called St Bartholomew's, adjacent to the old village of Boteleigh, was mentioned in the Domesday Book of 1086. This church, 1 mile (1.6 km) south of the current village, was largely destroyed after a large poplar tree fell onto the nave in the early 1830s. This reduced the original capacity of 500 to what had been the chancel. The existing structure is 13th-century with an older doorway retrieved from the ruins and reset in the west wall. The east window is Perpendicular Gothic in style and dates from the 15th century. The church was formally declared redundant in May 1982.

A 'Dissenters Church' was built in Winchester Street in 1800, attracting a growing congregation.

=== All Saints ===
Following the partial destruction of St Bartholomew's, a replacement church, dedicated to All Saints, was constructed between 1835 and 1836. The new church was closer to the centre of the village; parishioners were finding it increasingly troublesome to take the path across the fields to the old church. The yellow-brick Gothic Revival church, designed by James William Wild, was consecrated on 22 August 1836. The church's font dates to around the 12th century; possibly from St Bartholomew's, it was recovered from a field in 1740.

The church was expanded in 1859, and architect Thomas Graham Jackson designed further expansions in 1892 and 1895. A church room was built in 1967, and a two-storey extension was completed in 2008.

== Twin towns ==
Botley is twinned with:

- Saint-Jean-Brévelay, France
- Plumelec, France
- Plaudren, France
