= Bastable =

Bastable may refer to:

== Characters ==
- The Bastables, characters in the 1899 novel The Story of the Treasure Seekers and its sequels by E. Nesbit
- Ornery Bastable, a character in the 1998 novel Six Moon Dance by American writer Sheri S. Tepper
- Oswald Bastable, a character in stories by British writer Michael Moorcock

== People ==
- Charles Francis Bastable (fl. 1882–1932), Irish economist and Whately Chair of Political Economy, Trinity College, Dublin, Ireland
- Steve Bastable (born 1956), British speedway rider
- Tony Bastable (1944–2007), British television presenter

== Places ==
- Bastable Theatre, theatre in Syracuse, New York

== See also ==
- Barnstable (disambiguation)
- Barstable (disambiguation)
