= Barnstable Bay =

Barnstable Bay may be:

- An alternative name of Bideford Bay, Devon, England (Barnstaple Bay)
- A Colonial-era name of Cape Cod Bay, Massachusetts (Barnstable Bay)
