= Barnsole =

Village in Kent, England

Coordinates: 51.26°N 1.265°E

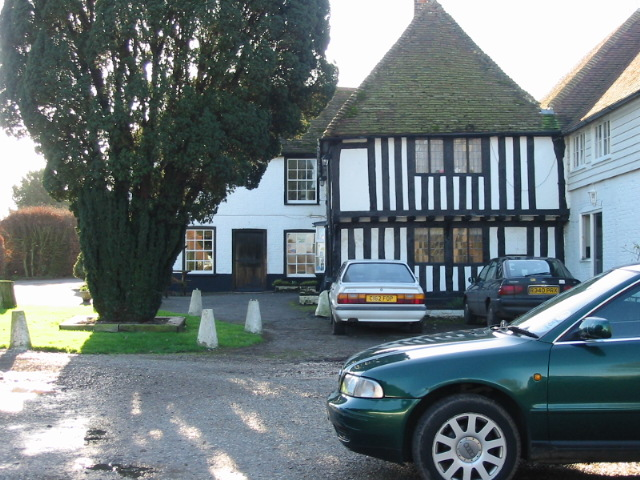
- The Black Pig pub, Barnsole

- Location within Kent
- OS grid reference: TR2656
- District: Dover
- Shire county: Kent
- Region: South East
- Country: England
- Sovereign state: United Kingdom
- Post town: Canterbury
- Postcode district: CT3
- Police: Kent
- Fire: Kent
- Ambulance: South East Coast

Barnsole is a village in East Kent, England, between Canterbury and Deal. The population of the village is included in the civil parish of Wingham.

It once had a Baptist chapel, linked to the Eythorne Baptist Church "group".
