= Barrowhill =

Coordinates: 51.0966°N 1.0096°E

- Location within Kent
- OS grid reference: TR1037
- Shire county: Kent
- Region: South East
- Country: England
- Sovereign state: United Kingdom
- Police: Kent
- Fire: Kent
- Ambulance: South East Coast

Barrowhill is a village in Kent, England, between Ashford and Folkestone.
