= Bareless =

Coordinates: 55.640°N 2.200°W

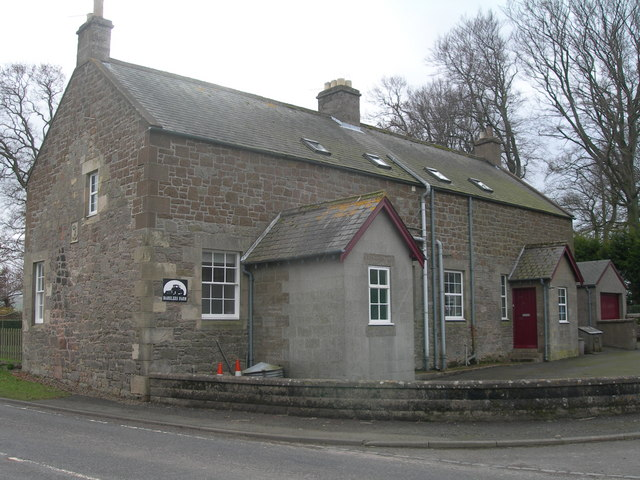
- Bareless Farm

- Location within Northumberland
- OS grid reference: NT875385
- Unitary authority: Northumberland
- Ceremonial county: Northumberland
- Region: North East
- Country: England
- Sovereign state: United Kingdom
- Post town: CORNHILL-ON-TWEED
- Postcode district: TD12
- Police: Northumbria
- Fire: Northumberland
- Ambulance: North East
- UK Parliament: Berwick-upon-Tweed

Bareless is a hamlet in Northumberland, England.

== Governance ==
Bareless is in the parliamentary constituency of Berwick-upon-Tweed.
