= Barleycroft End =

Hamlet in Hertfordshire, England

Coordinates: 51.92°N 0.07°E

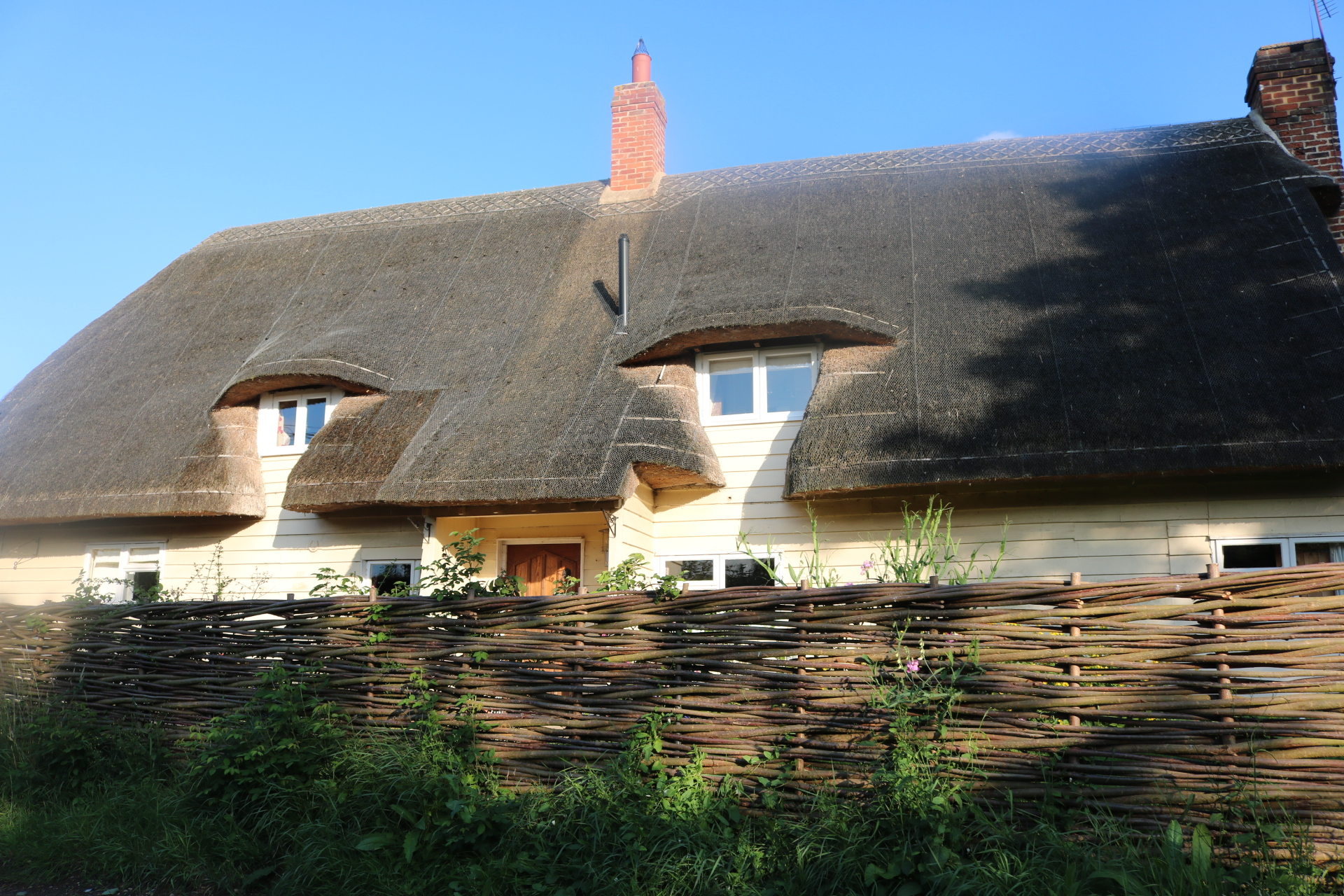
- Thatched cottage in Barleycroft End

- Location within Hertfordshire
- OS grid reference: TL4327
- Shire county: Hertfordshire
- Region: East
- Country: England
- Sovereign state: United Kingdom
- Post town: Buntingford
- Postcode district: SG9
- Police: Hertfordshire
- Fire: Hertfordshire
- Ambulance: East of England

Barleycroft End is a hamlet in Hertfordshire, England. It is in the civil parish of Furneux Pelham.

== History ==
There was a beer brewery at Barleycroft End, the Pelham Brewery. It opened 1855 and closed 1987.
