= Barnsdale Gardens =

Gardens in Rutland, England

Coordinates: 52.6870°N 0.6513°W

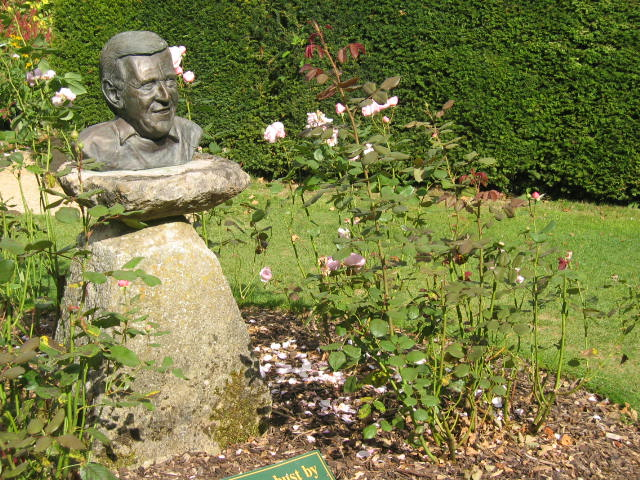
Bust of Geoff Hamilton at Barnsdale

Barnsdale Gardens in Rutland, England, were made famous by Geoff Hamilton through the BBC television series Gardeners' World, which he presented from 1979 until his death in 1996. They are on The Avenue in Exton, a short distance north of Rutland Water.

Geoff Hamilton began developing the garden in 1983 from what was then a ploughed field. It now covers 8 acres (3.2 ha), comprising 37 individual gardens and features. Previously, his garden was on the Barnsdale Hall estate, one mile to the south.
