= Barrow Hann =

Village in North Lincolnshire, England

Coordinates: 53.68°N 00.36°W

- Location within Lincolnshire
- OS grid reference: TA0822
- Unitary authority: North Lincolnshire
- Ceremonial county: Lincolnshire
- Region: Yorkshire and the Humber
- Country: England
- Sovereign state: United Kingdom
- Post town: Barrow-upon-Humber
- Postcode district: DN19
- Police: Humberside
- Fire: Humberside
- Ambulance: East Midlands

Barrow Hann is a village in North Lincolnshire, England. It is in the civil parish of Barrow upon Humber.
