= Barnside =

Hamlet near Hepworth in West Yorkshire, England

Coordinates: 53.550233°N 1.743017°W

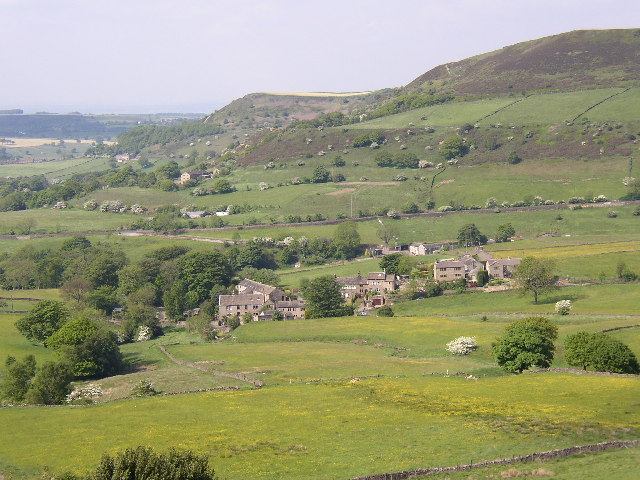
- Barnside hamlet, Hepworth

- Location within West Yorkshire
- Metropolitan borough: Kirklees
- Metropolitan county: West Yorkshire
- Region: Yorkshire and the Humber
- Country: England
- Sovereign state: United Kingdom
- Post town: Holmfirth
- Postcode district: HD9
- Dialling code: 01484
- Police: West Yorkshire
- Fire: West Yorkshire
- Ambulance: Yorkshire
- UK Parliament: Colne Valley

Barnside is a hamlet on Barnside Lane approximately 3/4 mile to the southeast of Hepworth in West Yorkshire, England. It is in the civic parish of Holme Valley and the metropolitan borough of Kirklees.

== History ==
In 1822 Thomas Langdale recorded that Barnside-Wood in the township of Hepworth comprised four farm houses.

Barnside Colliery, approximately 1/2 mile from the current hamlet operated from c. 1855–c. 1887.
