= Barton Gate =

Village in Staffordshire, England

Coordinates: 52.76°N 01.74°W

- Location within Staffordshire
- OS grid reference: SK1719
- Shire county: Staffordshire
- Region: West Midlands
- Country: England
- Sovereign state: United Kingdom
- Post town: Burton-on-Trent
- Postcode district: DE13 8
- Police: Staffordshire
- Fire: Staffordshire
- Ambulance: West Midlands

Barton Gate is a village in Staffordshire, England. For population details at the 2011 census see Barton-under-Needwood.
