= Barrows Green, Cumbria =

Village in Cumbria, England

Coordinates: 54.28°N 02.73°W

Barrows Green
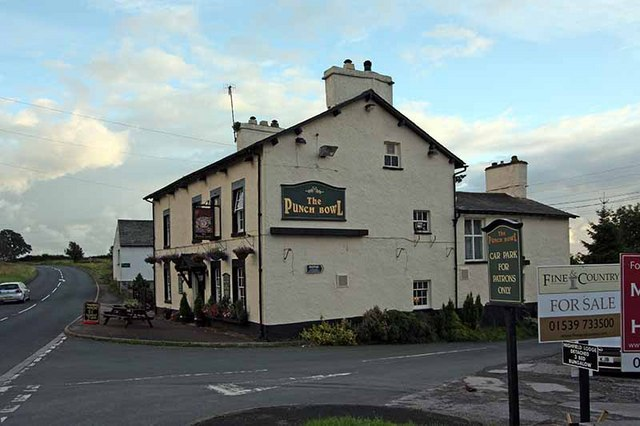
- The Punch Bowl public house, Barrows Green

- Location in former South Lakeland district Location within Cumbria
- OS grid reference: SD5288
- Civil parish: Stainton
- Unitary authority: Westmorland and Furness
- Ceremonial county: Cumbria
- Region: North West
- Country: England
- Sovereign state: United Kingdom
- Post town: KENDAL
- Postcode district: LA8
- Dialling code: 015395
- Police: Cumbria
- Fire: Cumbria
- Ambulance: North West
- UK Parliament: Westmorland and Lonsdale

Barrows Green is a village in Cumbria, England.
