= Barwell (surname) =

Barwell is a surname, and may refer to:

- Bobbie Barwell (1895–1985), New Zealand photographer
- Eric Barwell (1913–2007), British flying ace of the Second World War
- Gavin Barwell (born 1972), British Conservative Party politician
- Henry Barwell (1877–1959), 28th Premier of South Australia
- Len Barwell, New Zealand football player
- Phillip R. Barwell, DFC, Group Captain Officer No. 46 Squadron RAF
- Terry Barwell (born 1937), South African cricketer
- William Barwell (1705–1769), administrator of the English East India Company
