= Barrow's Green =

Village in Cheshire, England

Coordinates: 53.37°N 02.72°W

- Location within Cheshire
- OS grid reference: SJ5287
- Ceremonial county: Cheshire
- Region: North West
- Country: England
- Sovereign state: United Kingdom
- Police: Cheshire
- Fire: Cheshire
- Ambulance: North West

Barrow's Green is a village in Cheshire, England.
