= Barnyards, Highland =

Small hamlet in the Scottish council area of Highland

Coordinates: 57.489°N 4.451°W

Barnyards
- Location within the Inverness area
- OS grid reference: NH532459
- Council area: Highland
- Country: Scotland
- Sovereign state: United Kingdom
- Postcode district: IV4 7
- Police: Scotland
- Fire: Scottish
- Ambulance: Scottish

Barnyards (Scottish Gaelic:) is a small hamlet, located 1 mile north east of Beauly in Inverness-shire, Scottish Highlands and is in the Scottish council area of Highland.
