= Barton, Isle of Wight =

Suburb of Newport, Isle of Wight, England

Coordinates: 50°42′06″N 1°17′06″W

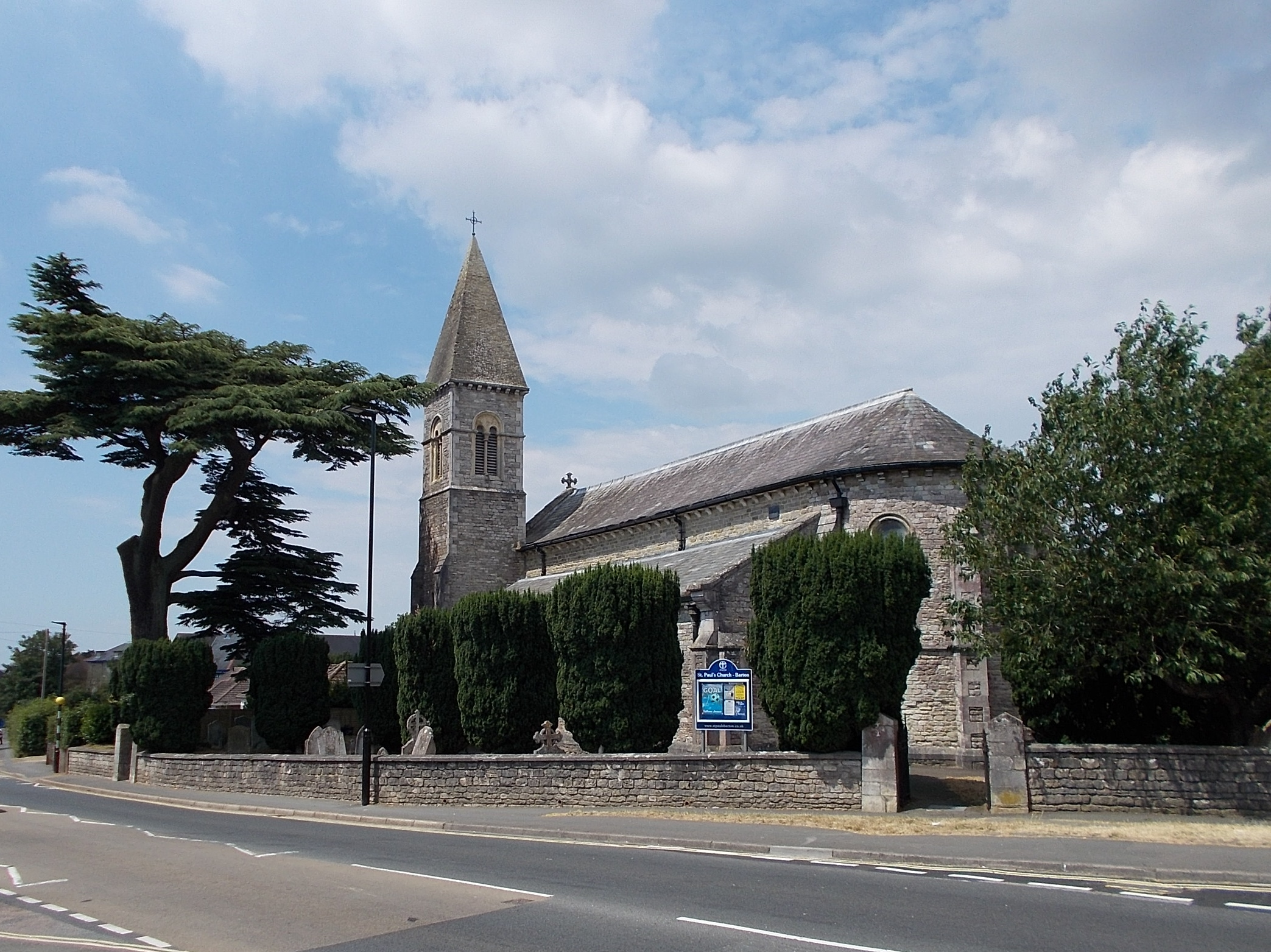
St Paul's Church, Barton

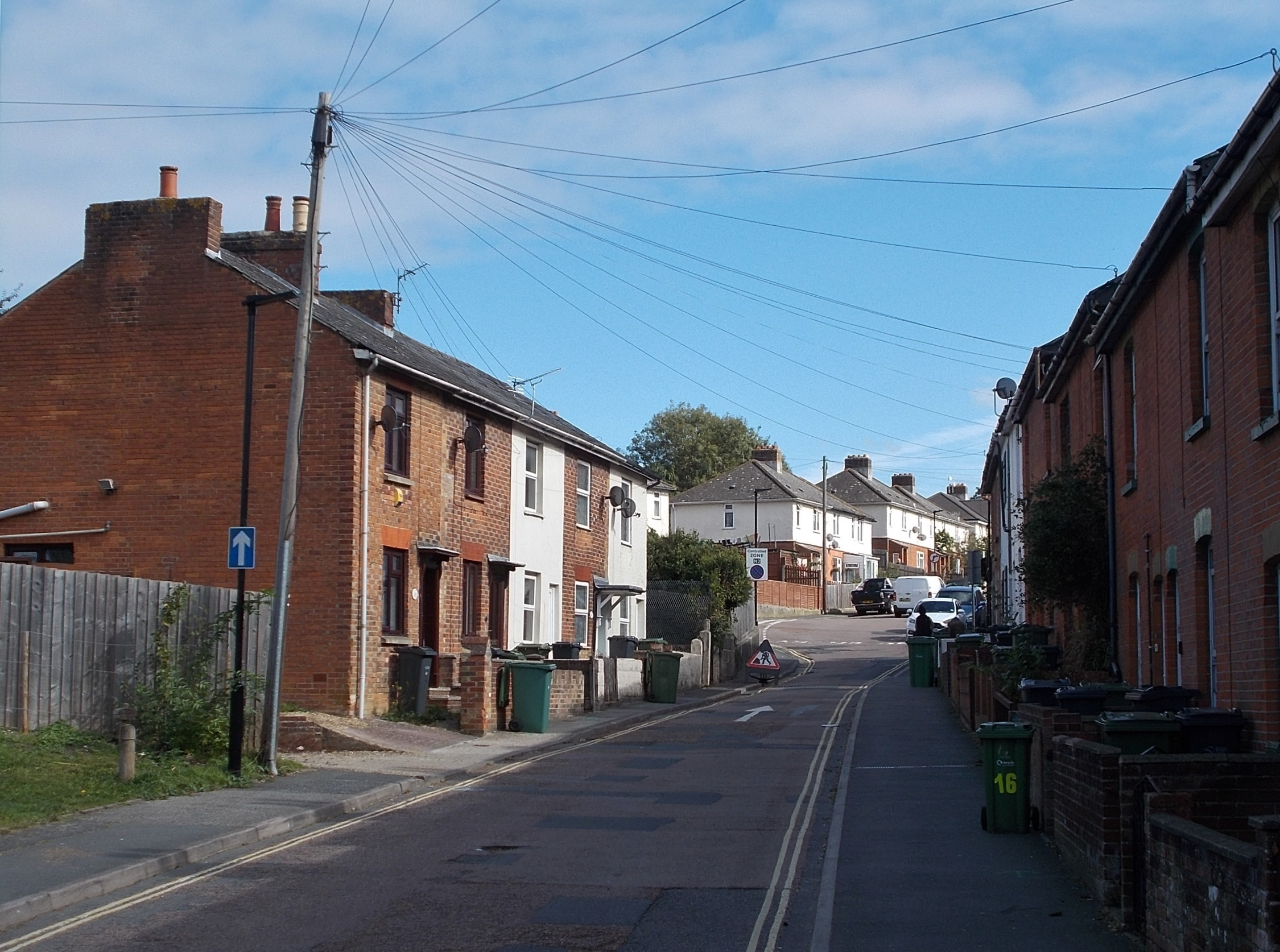
Barton Road

Barton is an area in the east of Newport on the Isle of Wight. Transport is provided by Southern Vectis community service route 39 to the town centre and standard service routes 8 and 9 to Sandown and Ryde, which run nearby.

Barton was built around 1844 to the east of Newport town centre; the first houses to be built were in Barton Road itself and are on the right hand side leading from Coppins Bridge. Most of the original Victorian terraced houses still remain today, as well as St. Paul's Church which lies in Staplers Road. The architectural style of the original Barton houses is very typical of Victorian houses in the Newport area, with red brick facades and grey slate roof tiles. The former Barton Primary School site dates from around the same period.

Original Barton roads include Barton Road itself, St. Pauls View Road, Bellmeade Lane, Halberry Lane, Harvey Road, Cross Lane, Victoria Road, School Lane, Royal Exchange, John Street and Green Street.

In the mid-1930s, the first council properties were built in Barton Road, School Lane and Highfield Road.

In around 1955, the initial Pan Estate development began, which is extended south and east beyond Barton and continues toward Pan Lane. The estate was further developed in the late 1960s and mid-1970s to take in the growth of the local population. An additional school was built for the local area in 1970 when Downside Middle School opened. This initially took children in from all over the west and north of the Island. The school closed as part of the 2011 Island schools reorganisation; the building now houses the re-located Barton Primary School, East Newport Family Centre and Downside Community Centre.

During the 1950s, 1960s and 1970s, a team called Barton was represented in the Isle of Wight Football League and were quite successful challenging for honours against the other notable sides of the time Parkhurst and Seaview. Notable Barton players included Willie Creighton, who was actually brought up in Barton Road itself.

Barton is known locally as 'Barton Village' and is technically not part of the more modern Pan Estate.

== Name ==
First recorded in 1862 as Barton Village, it was named after a builder with name Barton who built a row of houses, built from 1841-1851.

== See also ==
- St. Paul's Church, Newport
