= Barwell, London =

Coordinates: 51.354725°N 0.319215°W

Barwell
- Location within Greater London
- London borough: Kingston
- Ceremonial county: Greater London
- Region: London
- Country: England
- Sovereign state: United Kingdom
- Post town: LONDON
- Postcode district: KT9
- Police: Metropolitan
- Fire: London
- Ambulance: London
- London Assembly: South West

Barwell is a small locality in the London Borough of Kingston upon Thames, located between Chessington and Claygate and historically in the county of Surrey. It was traditionally farmland, its name likely alluding the barley that was grown in the area.
