= List of United Kingdom locations: Ka-Key =

The United Kingdom

This is part of the list of United Kingdom locations: a gazetteer of place names in the United Kingdom showing each place's locality and geographical coordinates.

== Ka ==
Location	Locality	Coordinates (links to map & photo sources)	OS grid reference
Kaber	Cumbria	54.49°N 02.32°W	NY7911
Kaimend	South Lanarkshire	55.68°N 03.60°W	NS9945
Kaimes	City of Edinburgh	55.90°N 03.18°W	NT2668
Kaimhill	Aberdeenshire	57.11°N 02.13°W	NJ9203
Kaimrig End	Scottish Borders	55.65°N 03.44°W	NT0941
Kalnakill	Highland	57.51°N 05.85°W	NG6954
Kames	East Ayrshire	55.51°N 04.07°W	NS6926
Kames	Argyll and Bute	55.88°N 05.24°W	NR9771
Kates Hill or Kate's Hill	Dudley	52.50°N 02.07°W	SO9590

== Ke ==
=== Kea-Kem ===
Location	Locality	Coordinates (links to map & photo sources)	OS grid reference
Kea	Cornwall	50.23°N 05.08°W	SW8042
Keadby	North Lincolnshire	53.58°N 00.74°W	SE8311
Kealasay (Cealasaigh)	Western Isles	58.27°N 06.87°W	NB145418
Keal Cotes	Lincolnshire	53.12°N 00.03°E	TF3661
Keallasay Beg (Ceallasaigh Beag)	Western Isles	57.62°N 07.16°W	NF917710
Keallasay More (Ceallasaigh Mòr)	Western Isles	57.63°N 07.17°W	NF910719
Kearby Town End	North Yorkshire	53.91°N 01.48°W	SE3447
Kearsney	Kent	51.14°N 01.25°E	TR2843
Kearsley	Bolton	53.54°N 02.37°W	SD7505
Kearstay (Chearstaidh)	Western Isles	58.03°N 07.14°W	NA963171
Kearstwick	Cumbria	54.20°N 02.61°W	SD6079
Kearton	North Yorkshire	54.38°N 02.01°W	SD9999
Keasden	North Yorkshire	54.08°N 02.42°W	SD7266
Keava (Ceabhaigh)	Western Isles	58.21°N 06.77°W	NB197350
Kebock Head	Western Isles	58.03°N 06.37°W	NB420134
Kebroyd	Calderdale	53.68°N 01.94°W	SE0421
Keckwick	Cheshire	53.34°N 02.64°W	SJ5783
Keddington	Lincolnshire	53.37°N 00.01°E	TF3488
Keddington Corner	Lincolnshire	53.38°N 00.02°E	TF3589
Kedington	Suffolk	52.08°N 00.48°E	TL7046
Kedleston	Derbyshire	52.96°N 01.55°W	SK3041
Kedlock	Fife	56.35°N 03.00°W	NO3819
Kedlock Feus	Fife	56.35°N 03.02°W	NO3719
Kedslie	Scottish Borders	55.65°N 02.71°W	NT5540
Keekle	Cumbria	54.52°N 03.54°W	NY0016
Keelars Tye	Essex	51.86°N 00.97°E	TM0523
Keelby	Lincolnshire	53.57°N 00.24°W	TA1610
Keele	Staffordshire	53.00°N 02.29°W	SJ8045
Keeley Green	Bedfordshire	52.10°N 00.54°W	TL0046
Keelham	Bradford	53.78°N 01.89°W	SE0732
Keenley	Northumberland	54.89°N 02.32°W	NY7956
Keenthorne	Somerset	51.14°N 03.13°W	ST2139
Keeres Green	Essex	51.80°N 00.30°E	TL5914
Keeston (Keyston)	Pembrokeshire	51.83°N 05.04°W	SM9019
Keevil	Wiltshire	51.32°N 02.11°W	ST9258
Kegworth	Leicestershire	52.82°N 01.28°W	SK4826
Kehelland	Cornwall	50.22°N 05.33°W	SW6241
Keig	Aberdeenshire	57.26°N 02.64°W	NJ6119
Keighley	Bradford	53.86°N 01.91°W	SE0641
Keilarsbrae	Clackmannan	56.11°N 03.78°W	NS8993
Keilhill	Aberdeenshire	57.62°N 02.48°W	NJ7159
Keillbeg	Argyll and Bute	55.95°N 05.70°W	NR6980
Keillmore	Argyll and Bute	55.95°N 05.71°W	NR6880
Keils	Argyll and Bute	55.84°N 05.96°W	NR5268
Keinton Mandeville	Somerset	51.06°N 02.65°W	ST5430
Keiravagh Islands	Western Isles	57.41°N 07.20°W	NF877474
Keir Mill	Dumfries and Galloway	55.21°N 03.80°W	NX8593
Keisby	Lincolnshire	52.84°N 00.47°W	TF0328
Keiss	Highland	58.53°N 03.13°W	ND3461
Keistle	Highland	57.47°N 06.28°W	NG4351
Keith	Moray	57.53°N 02.97°W	NJ4250
Keith Inch	Aberdeenshire	57.49°N 01.78°W	NK1345
Kelbrook	Lancashire	53.89°N 02.15°W	SD9044
Kelby	Lincolnshire	52.95°N 00.51°W	TF0041
Kelcliffe	Leeds	53.87°N 01.72°W	SE1842
Keld	Cumbria	54.51°N 02.69°W	NY5514
Keld	North Yorkshire	54.40°N 02.17°W	NY8901
Keldholme	North Yorkshire	54.26°N 00.92°W	SE7086
Keld Houses	North Yorkshire	54.06°N 01.84°W	SE1063
Kelfield	North Yorkshire	53.83°N 01.10°W	SE5938
Kelfield	Lincolnshire	53.49°N 00.76°W	SE8201
Kelham	Nottinghamshire	53.08°N 00.85°W	SK7755
Kelhurn	Argyll and Bute	55.95°N 04.67°W	NS3377
Kella	Isle of Man	54.32°N 04.47°W	SC3995
Kellacott	Devon	50.66°N 04.26°W	SX4088
Kellamergh	Lancashire	53.75°N 02.91°W	SD4029
Kellas	Moray	57.56°N 03.38°W	NJ1754
Kellas	Angus	56.50°N 02.89°W	NO4535
Kellaton	Devon	50.23°N 03.68°W	SX8039
Kellaways	Wiltshire	51.47°N 02.07°W	ST9575
Kelleth	Cumbria	54.43°N 02.52°W	NY6605
Kelleythorpe	East Riding of Yorkshire	53.99°N 00.46°W	TA0156
Kelling	Norfolk	52.93°N 01.10°E	TG0942
Kellingley	North Yorkshire	53.71°N 01.21°W	SE5224
Kellington	North Yorkshire	53.70°N 01.16°W	SE5524
Kellister	Shetland Islands	60.69°N 01.01°W	HP5402
Kelloe	Durham	54.71°N 01.47°W	NZ3436
Kelloholm	Dumfries and Galloway	55.37°N 03.99°W	NS7411
Kells	Cumbria	54.52°N 03.60°W	NX9616
Kelly	Devon	50.60°N 04.27°W	SX3981
Kelly	Cornwall	50.52°N 04.80°W	SX0173
Kelly Bray	Cornwall	50.51°N 04.32°W	SX3571
Kelmarsh	Northamptonshire	52.40°N 00.92°W	SP7379
Kelmscott	Oxfordshire	51.68°N 01.63°W	SU2599
Kelsale	Suffolk	52.23°N 01.48°E	TM3865
Kelsall	Cheshire	53.20°N 02.72°W	SJ5268
Kelsey Head	Cornwall	50.40°N 05.14°W	SW767604
Kelshall	Hertfordshire	52.00°N 00.07°W	TL3236
Kelsick	Cumbria	54.83°N 03.26°W	NY1950
Kelso	Scottish Borders	55.59°N 02.44°W	NT7234
Kelstedge	Derbyshire	53.16°N 01.50°W	SK3363
Kelstern	Lincolnshire	53.39°N 00.12°W	TF2590
Kelsterton	Flintshire	53.22°N 03.09°W	SJ2770
Kelston	Bath and North East Somerset	51.40°N 02.43°W	ST7067
Keltneyburn	Perth and Kinross	56.61°N 04.00°W	NN7749
Kelton	Dumfries and Galloway	55.01°N 03.59°W	NX9870
Kelton	Durham	54.57°N 02.12°W	NY9220
Kelton Hill	Dumfries and Galloway	54.91°N 03.96°W	NX7459
Kelty	Fife	56.13°N 03.38°W	NT1494
Keltybridge	Fife	56.14°N 03.38°W	NT1495
Kelvedon	Essex	51.82°N 00.69°E	TL8618
Kelvedon Hatch	Essex	51.65°N 00.25°E	TQ5698
Kelvin	South Lanarkshire	55.74°N 04.18°W	NS6352
Kelvindale	City of Glasgow	55.88°N 04.31°W	NS5568
Kelvinside	City of Glasgow	55.87°N 04.30°W	NS5667
Kelynack	Cornwall	50.10°N 05.67°W	SW3729
Kemacott	Devon	51.20°N 03.91°W	SS6647
Kemback	Fife	56.32°N 02.95°W	NO4115
Kemberton	Shropshire	52.63°N 02.40°W	SJ7304
Kemble	Gloucestershire	51.67°N 02.03°W	ST9897
Kemble Wick	Gloucestershire	51.65°N 02.03°W	ST9895
Kemerton	Worcestershire	52.03°N 02.08°W	SO9437
Kemincham	Cheshire	53.20°N 02.30°W	SJ8068
Kemnal	Bromley	51.424°N 00.080°E	TQ447715
Kemnay	Aberdeenshire	57.23°N 02.44°W	NJ7316
Kempe's Corner	Kent	51.17°N 00.90°E	TR0346
Kempley	Gloucestershire	51.95°N 02.48°W	SO6729
Kempley Green	Gloucestershire	51.95°N 02.48°W	SO6729
Kempsey	Worcestershire	52.13°N 02.22°W	SO8549
Kempsford	Gloucestershire	51.66°N 01.77°W	SU1696
Kemps Green	Warwickshire	52.32°N 01.79°W	SP1470
Kempshott	Hampshire	51.24°N 01.14°W	SU6050
Kempston	Bedfordshire	52.12°N 00.49°W	TL0348
Kempston Church End	Bedfordshire	52.11°N 00.52°W	TL0147
Kempston Hardwick	Bedfordshire	52.08°N 00.49°W	TL0344
Kempston West End	Bedfordshire	52.11°N 00.55°W	SP9947
Kempton	Shropshire	52.43°N 02.95°W	SO3582
Kemp Town	Brighton and Hove	50.81°N 00.12°W	TQ3203
Kemsing	Kent	51.30°N 00.22°E	TQ5558
Kemsley	Kent	51.36°N 00.72°E	TQ9066
Kemsley Street	Kent	51.32°N 00.58°E	TQ8062

=== Ken-Key ===
Location	Locality	Coordinates (links to map & photo sources)	OS grid reference
Kenardington	Kent	51.05°N 00.80°E	TQ9732
Kenchester	Herefordshire	52.08°N 02.83°W	SO4343
Kencot	Oxfordshire	51.73°N 01.63°W	SP2504
Kendal	Cumbria	54.32°N 02.75°W	SD5192
Kendal End	Worcestershire	52.36°N 02.00°W	SP0074
Kendleshire	South Gloucestershire	51.50°N 02.49°W	ST6679
Kendon	Caerphilly	51.67°N 03.17°W	ST1998
Kendoon	Dumfries and Galloway	55.15°N 04.19°W	NX6087
Kendram	Highland	57.68°N 06.31°W	NG4374
Kendray	Barnsley	53.54°N 01.45°W	SE3605
Kenfig	Bridgend	51.51°N 03.73°W	SS8081
Kenfig Hill	Bridgend	51.53°N 03.68°W	SS8383
Kenilworth	Warwickshire	52.33°N 01.57°W	SP2971
Kenley	Croydon	51.31°N 00.10°W	TQ3259
Kenley	Shropshire	52.59°N 02.65°W	SJ5600
Kenmore	Highland	57.54°N 05.76°W	NG7557
Kenmore	Perth and Kinross	56.58°N 04.00°W	NN7745
Kenn	Devon	50.65°N 03.52°W	SX9285
Kenn	North Somerset	51.41°N 02.84°W	ST4169
Kennards House	Cornwall	50.62°N 04.43°W	SX2883
Kenneggy	Cornwall	50.10°N 05.41°W	SW5628
Kenneggy Downs	Cornwall	50.11°N 05.41°W	SW5629
Kennerleigh	Devon	50.85°N 03.69°W	SS8107
Kennet	Clackmannan	56.10°N 03.73°W	NS9291
Kennethmont	Aberdeenshire	57.34°N 02.78°W	NJ5328
Kennett	Cambridgeshire	52.28°N 00.47°E	TL6968
Kennett End	Suffolk	52.26°N 00.49°E	TL7066
Kennford	Devon	50.66°N 03.54°W	SX9186
Kenninghall	Norfolk	52.43°N 00.98°E	TM0386
Kennington	Kent	51.16°N 00.87°E	TR0144
Kennington	Oxfordshire	51.71°N 01.24°W	SP5202
Kennington	Lambeth	51.47°N 00.12°W	TQ3077
Kennishead	City of Glasgow	55.81°N 04.33°W	NS5460
Kenn Moor Gate	North Somerset	51.39°N 02.80°W	ST4467
Kennoway	Fife	56.20°N 03.04°W	NO3502
Kenny	Somerset	50.94°N 02.98°W	ST3117
Kenny Hill	Suffolk	52.38°N 00.43°E	TL6679
Kennythorpe	North Yorkshire	54.07°N 00.80°W	SE7865
Kenovay	Argyll and Bute	56.51°N 06.89°W	NL9946
Kensaleyre	Highland	57.47°N 06.30°W	NG4251
Kensal Green	Hammersmith and Fulham	51.52°N 00.22°W	TQ2382
Kensal Rise	Brent	51.53°N 00.21°W	TQ2483
Kensal Town	Royal Borough of Kensington and Chelsea	51.52°N 00.21°W	TQ2482
Kensington	Royal Borough of Kensington and Chelsea	51.49°N 00.20°W	TQ2579
Kensington	Liverpool	53.41°N 02.96°W	SJ3691
Kensworth	Bedfordshire	51.85°N 00.52°W	TL0218
Kentallen	Highland	56.66°N 05.26°W	NN0057
Kentangaval	Western Isles	56.95°N 07.51°W	NL6598
Kentchurch	Monmouthshire	51.92°N 02.85°W	SO4125
Kentford	Suffolk	52.26°N 00.49°E	TL7066
Kent Gate	Bromley	51.364°N 00.019°W	TQ380646
Kent House	Bromley	51.412°N 00.044°W	TQ361699
Kentisbeare	Devon	50.86°N 03.33°W	ST0608
Kentisbury	Devon	51.16°N 03.97°W	SS6243
Kentisbury Ford	Devon	51.16°N 03.98°W	SS6142
Kentish Town	Camden	51.54°N 00.15°W	TQ2884
Kentmere	Cumbria	54.42°N 02.84°W	NY4504
Kenton	Devon	50.63°N 03.48°W	SX9583
Kenton	Suffolk	52.23°N 01.20°E	TM1965
Kenton	Brent	51.57°N 00.31°W	TQ1788
Kenton	Newcastle upon Tyne	54.99°N 01.65°W	NZ2267
Kenton Bank Foot	Newcastle upon Tyne	55.00°N 01.68°W	NZ2068
Kenton Bar	Newcastle upon Tyne	54.99°N 01.67°W	NZ2167
Kenton Corner	Suffolk	52.23°N 01.22°E	TM2065
Kenton Green	Gloucestershire	51.82°N 02.33°W	SO7714
Kentra	Highland	56.75°N 05.84°W	NM6569
Kentrigg	Cumbria	54.33°N 02.75°W	SD5194
Kents	Cornwall	50.72°N 04.56°W	SX1995
Kents Bank	Cumbria	54.17°N 02.93°W	SD3976
Kent's Green	Gloucestershire	51.90°N 02.37°W	SO7423
Kents Hill	Milton Keynes	52.02°N 00.70°W	SP8937
Kents Oak	Hampshire	51.01°N 01.54°W	SU3224
Kent Street	West Sussex	50.97°N 00.26°W	TQ2221
Kent Street	Kent	51.26°N 00.37°E	TQ6654
Kenwick	Shropshire	52.86°N 02.86°W	SJ4230
Kenwick Park	Shropshire	52.85°N 02.87°W	SJ4129
Kenwyn	Cornwall	50.26°N 05.06°W	SW8245
Kenyon	Cheshire	53.45°N 02.57°W	SJ6295
Kepdowrie	Stirling	56.11°N 04.33°W	NS5594
Kepnal	Wiltshire	51.33°N 01.75°W	SU1760
Kepwick	North Yorkshire	54.30°N 01.29°W	SE4690
Kerchesters	Scottish Borders	55.60°N 02.36°W	NT7735
Kerdiston	Norfolk	52.77°N 01.08°E	TG0824
Keresforth Hill	Barnsley	53.54°N 01.51°W	SE3205
Keresley	Coventry	52.45°N 01.54°W	SP3184
Keresley Newlands	Coventry	52.45°N 01.53°W	SP3284
Kerfield	Scottish Borders	55.64°N 03.19°W	NT2540
Keristal	Isle of Man	54.12°N 04.52°W	SC3573
Kerley Downs	Cornwall	50.25°N 05.14°W	SW7644
Kernborough	Devon	50.25°N 03.69°W	SX7941
Kerne Bridge	Herefordshire	51.85°N 02.61°W	SO5818
Kerrera	Argyll and Bute	56.39°N 05.55°W	NM806283
Kerridge	Cheshire	53.28°N 02.10°W	SJ9376
Kerridge-end	Cheshire	53.27°N 02.09°W	SJ9475
Kerris	Cornwall	50.08°N 05.58°W	SW4427
Kerroogarroo	Isle of Man	54.34°N 04.47°W	SC3997
Kerrow	Highland	57.33°N 04.77°W	NH3330
Kerry	Powys	52.49°N 03.26°W	SO1489
Kerrycroy	Argyll and Bute	55.80°N 05.03°W	NS1061
Kerry Hill	Staffordshire	53.03°N 02.12°W	SJ9249
Kerry's Gate	Herefordshire	51.99°N 02.88°W	SO3933
Kersal	Salford	53.50°N 02.28°W	SD8101
Kersall	Nottinghamshire	53.15°N 00.93°W	SK7162
Kersbrook	Devon	50.63°N 03.33°W	SY0683
Kersbrook Cross	Cornwall	50.55°N 04.38°W	SX3175
Kerscott	Devon	51.04°N 03.95°W	SS6329
Kersey	Suffolk	52.05°N 00.91°E	TM0044
Kersey Tye	Suffolk	52.05°N 00.88°E	TL9843
Kersey Upland	Suffolk	52.04°N 00.90°E	TL9942
Kershopefoot	Cumbria	55.13°N 02.83°W	NY4782
Kersoe	Worcestershire	52.04°N 02.01°W	SO9939
Kerswell	Devon	50.84°N 03.30°W	ST0806
Kerswell Green	Worcestershire	52.11°N 02.20°W	SO8646
Kerthen Wood	Cornwall	50.14°N 05.38°W	SW5833
Kesgrave	Suffolk	52.05°N 01.22°E	TM2145
Kessingland	Suffolk	52.41°N 01.70°E	TM5286
Kessingland Beach	Suffolk	52.40°N 01.71°E	TM5385
Kestle	Cornwall	50.27°N 04.82°W	SW9945
Kestle Mill	Cornwall	50.39°N 05.02°W	SW8559
Keston	Bromley	51.35°N 00.02°E	TQ4164
Keston Mark	Bromley	51.36°N 00.03°E	TQ4265
Keswick	Cumbria	54.59°N 03.14°W	NY2623
Keswick (North Norfolk)	Norfolk	52.84°N 01.48°E	TG3533
Keswick (South Norfolk)	Norfolk	52.58°N 01.24°E	TG2004
Kete	Pembrokeshire	51.69°N 05.18°W	SM8004
Ketford	Gloucestershire	51.96°N 02.40°W	SO7230
Ketley	Shropshire	52.68°N 02.48°W	SJ6710
Ketley Bank	Shropshire	52.68°N 02.46°W	SJ6910
Ketsby	Lincolnshire	53.26°N 00.03°E	TF3676
Kettering	Northamptonshire	52.39°N 00.72°W	SP8778
Ketteringham	Norfolk	52.57°N 01.18°E	TG1602
Kettins	Perth and Kinross	56.52°N 03.25°W	NO2338
Kettlebaston	Suffolk	52.11°N 00.86°E	TL9650
Kettlebridge	Fife	56.25°N 03.13°W	NO3007
Kettlebrook	Staffordshire	52.62°N 01.69°W	SK2103
Kettleburgh	Suffolk	52.19°N 01.30°E	TM2660
Kettle Corner	Kent	51.25°N 00.46°E	TQ7253
Kettle Green	Hertfordshire	51.84°N 00.04°E	TL4118
Kettlehill	Fife	56.25°N 03.09°W	NO3207
Kettleholm	Dumfries and Galloway	55.07°N 03.34°W	NY1476
Kettleshulme	Cheshire	53.30°N 02.03°W	SJ9879
Kettlesing	North Yorkshire	54.00°N 01.66°W	SE2256
Kettlesing Bottom	North Yorkshire	54.00°N 01.66°W	SE2257
Kettlester	Shetland Islands	60.49°N 01.07°W	HU5179
Kettlestone	Norfolk	52.84°N 00.90°E	TF9631
Kettlethorpe	Lincolnshire	53.26°N 00.74°W	SK8475
Kettlethorpe	Wakefield	53.64°N 01.51°W	SE3216
Kettletoft	Orkney Islands	59.22°N 02.61°W	HY6538
Kettlewell	North Yorkshire	54.14°N 02.04°W	SD9772
Ketton	Rutland	52.62°N 00.56°W	SK9704
Kevington / Kevingtown	Bromley	51.387°N 00.131°E	TQ484675
Kew	Richmond Upon Thames	51.47°N 00.28°W	TQ1977
Keward	Somerset	51.19°N 02.65°W	ST5444
Kewstoke	North Somerset	51.36°N 02.96°W	ST3363
Kexbrough	Barnsley	53.57°N 01.54°W	SE3009
Kexby	York	53.95°N 00.93°W	SE7051
Kexby	Lincolnshire	53.35°N 00.69°W	SK8785
Keybridge	Cornwall	50.52°N 04.71°W	SX0873
Keycol	Kent	51.34°N 00.68°E	TQ8764
Keyford	Somerset	51.22°N 02.33°W	ST7747
Key Green	North Yorkshire	54.42°N 00.76°W	NZ8004
Key Green	Cheshire	53.16°N 02.16°W	SJ8963
Keyham	Leicestershire	52.64°N 01.01°W	SK6706
Keyhaven	Hampshire	50.71°N 01.57°W	SZ3091
Keyhead	Aberdeenshire	57.58°N 01.88°W	NK0755
Keyingham	East Riding of Yorkshire	53.70°N 00.12°W	TA2425
Keymer	West Sussex	50.91°N 00.13°W	TQ3115
Keynsham	Bath and North East Somerset	51.41°N 02.50°W	ST6568
Keysers Estate	Hertfordshire	51.73°N 00.01°W	TL3706
Key's Green	Kent	51.12°N 00.35°E	TQ6539
Keysoe	Bedfordshire	52.24°N 00.43°W	TL0762
Keysoe Row	Bedfordshire	52.23°N 00.41°W	TL0861
Keyston	Cambridgeshire	52.36°N 00.47°W	TL0475
Key Street	Kent	51.34°N 00.69°E	TQ8864
Keyworth	Nottinghamshire	52.86°N 01.09°W	SK6130
