= Kelton =

Kelton may refer to:

== Places ==
England

- Kelton, a location in Mickleton parish, County Durham

Scotland

- Kelton, a parish in Kirkcudbrightshire; see Castle Douglas

United States

- Kelton, Pennsylvania, an unincorporated community
- Kelton, Texas, an unincorporated community
- Kelton, Utah, a ghost town

== People ==
- Kelton (surname)
- Kelton Flinn, American computer game designer, founder of Kesmai
- Kelton Hatcher, a member a Canadian junior ice hockey team called the Sarnia Sting, who are based in Sarnia, Ontario
- Kelton B. Miller (1860–1941), American journalist and politician
- Kelton Pell, Aboriginal Australian stage, TV and film actor
- Kelton Winston (1939–1980), American football defensive back
- Fred Kelton Gage (1902–1951), American lawyer and politician

== Other uses ==
- Kelton station, former station in Dormont, Pennsylvania
- Roy "Jawjack" Kelton, a character from the 1988 movie 14 Going on 30

== See also ==
- Kelton House (disambiguation)
