= Woodleigh School =

Woodleigh School may refer to:

- Woodleigh School, North Yorkshire, England
- Woodleigh School, Melbourne, Australia
- Woodleigh School, New Zealand
