= Woodleigh School, North Yorkshire =

Woodleigh School

Location
- Langton; Malton, North Yorkshire, YO17 9QN; England; 54.094530°N 0.777420°W

Information
- Type: Preparatory Day and Boarding
- Religious affiliation: Church of England
- Established: 1929
- Founder: Arthur England
- Closed: 2012
- Local authority: North Yorkshire
- Specialist: Child centred education
- Department for Education URN: 121756 Tables
- Ofsted: Reports
- Staff: 20
- Age: 3 to 13
- Enrolment: 61
- Houses: North, South, East, West
- Colours: Royal blue and white
- Publication: The Woodleighan, and Woodleigh Weekly
- Website: http://www.woodleighschool.com/

Woodleigh School was a preparatory school for boys and girls aged 3 to 13, located in the village of Langton, North Yorkshire, England. It was established in 1929 and closed in August 2012. In its final year, it had 61 pupils, a mixture of day children and boarders.

The school was situated at Langton Hall between 1946 and 2012, historically the seat of the Norcliffe family. The Hall that was leased to Woodleigh School, owned at the time by their descendants, the Howard-Vyse family, is a Grade II listed building.

== History ==
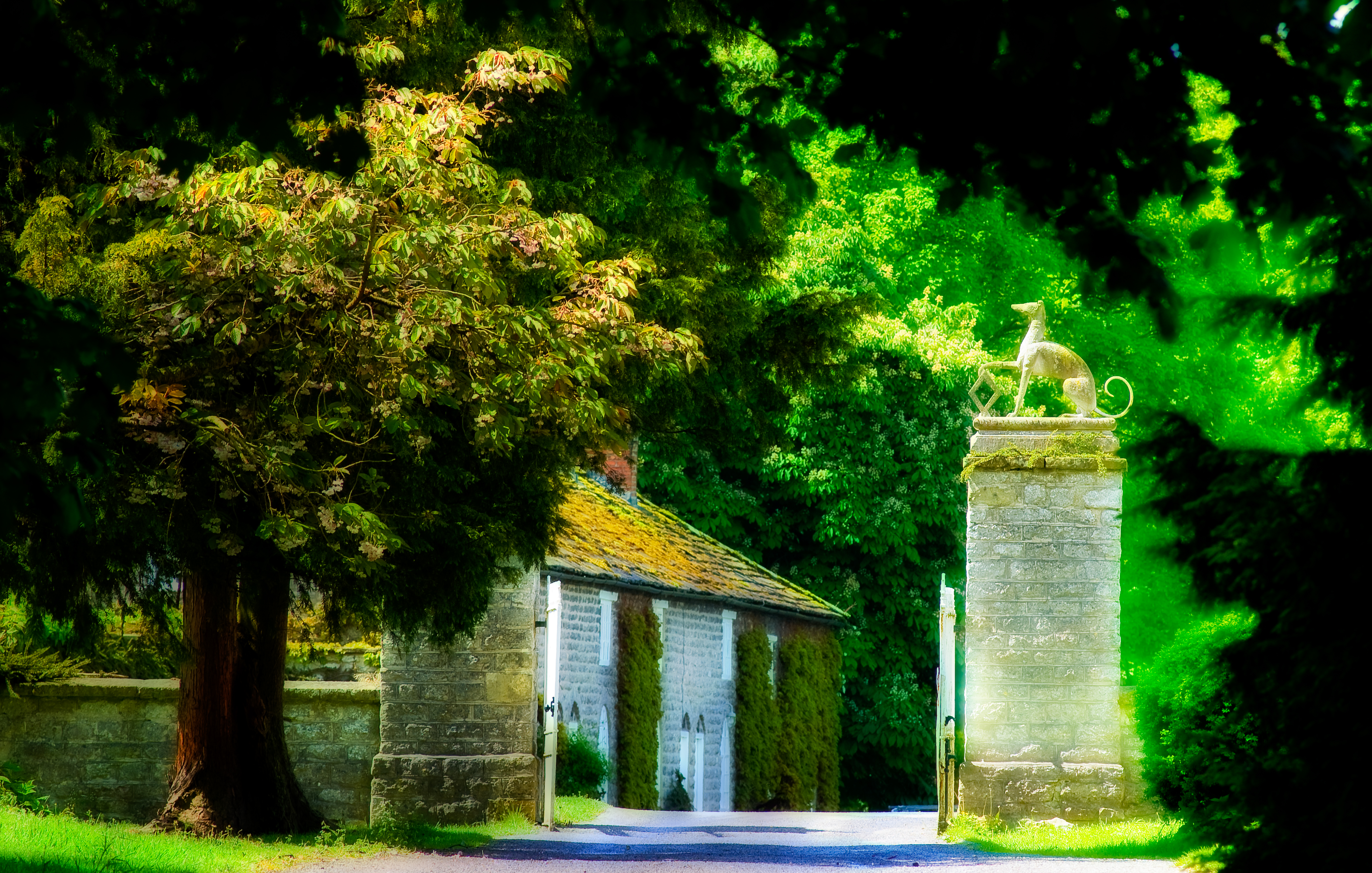
The gates of Langton Hall

The school was founded in 1929 in Hessle, near Hull, by the late Arthur England, grandfather of the last headmaster. There were no other boys’ preparatory schools in the area at the time. By 1930, two years after the school had launched, there were 25 pupils. During the war Woodleigh moved to Firby Hall near Westow village in 1939.

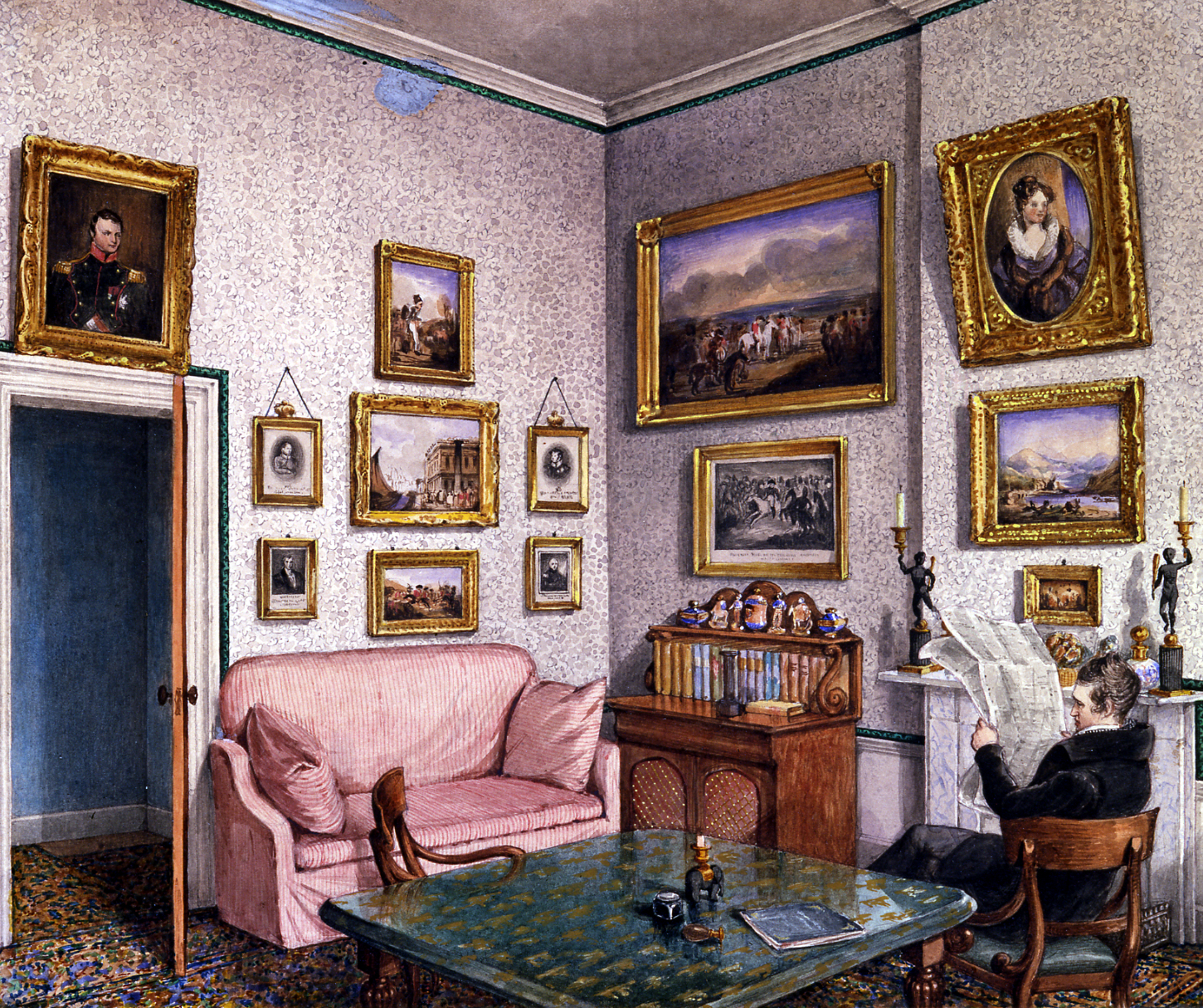
General Norcliffe Norcliffe, the ancestral owner, in his study at Langton Hall

In 1946 the school moved to Langton Hall, south of Malton, in the Yorkshire Wolds. The hall was previously owned by the Howard-Vyse family, descendants of the Norcliffe family. The oldest part of the house, formerly the old manor house, was by then in a bad state of repair. During the Second World War Langton Hall had been used as a base for the Guards Armoured Division while they had been preparing for D-Day. The Guards were reputedly visited by the Royal Family and Winston Churchill while they were based at the house. The hall itself dates back to the 18th century. The north wing was built in 1738 and the south wing was added in 1840.

The hall was registered as a Grade II listed building with English Heritage in 1951. The entrance gates on the east side of Langton Hall and the flanking wall, dating from the middle of the 19th century, were added to the listed buildings register in 1966.

== Organisation ==
Woodleigh School was part of the York Boarding Schools Group. It was owned by Woodleigh School Langton Limited, which also operated Langton Hall Language School on the same site.

== Curriculum ==
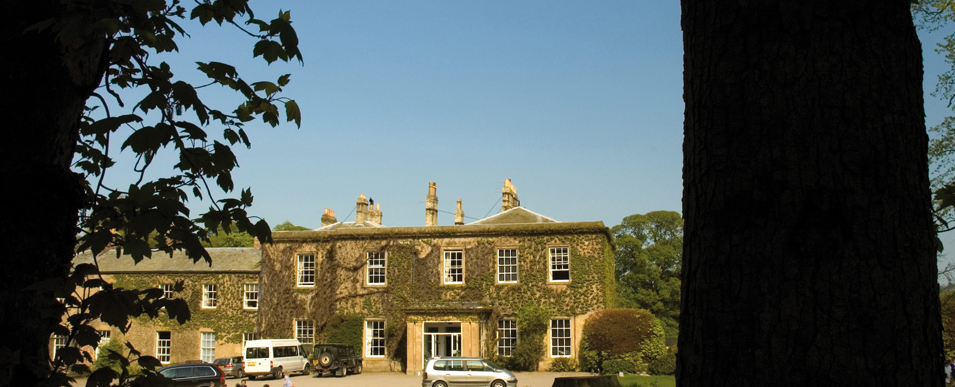
Woodleigh School

Woodleigh School had a Learning Support Department with a specialist teacher for pupils with dyslexia and dyscalculia. In March 2012 Woodleigh was recommended by First Eleven magazine for the "Teaching of special educational needs within a mainstream setting."

Music was augmented by a band and choir. Pupils were prepared for academic and music scholarships.

Emphasis was placed on the creative arts, in the form of drama, literature, writing, both in the classroom and by organising and taking part in regional and national events such as Youth Speaks and the Kids Lit Quiz.

== Sport ==
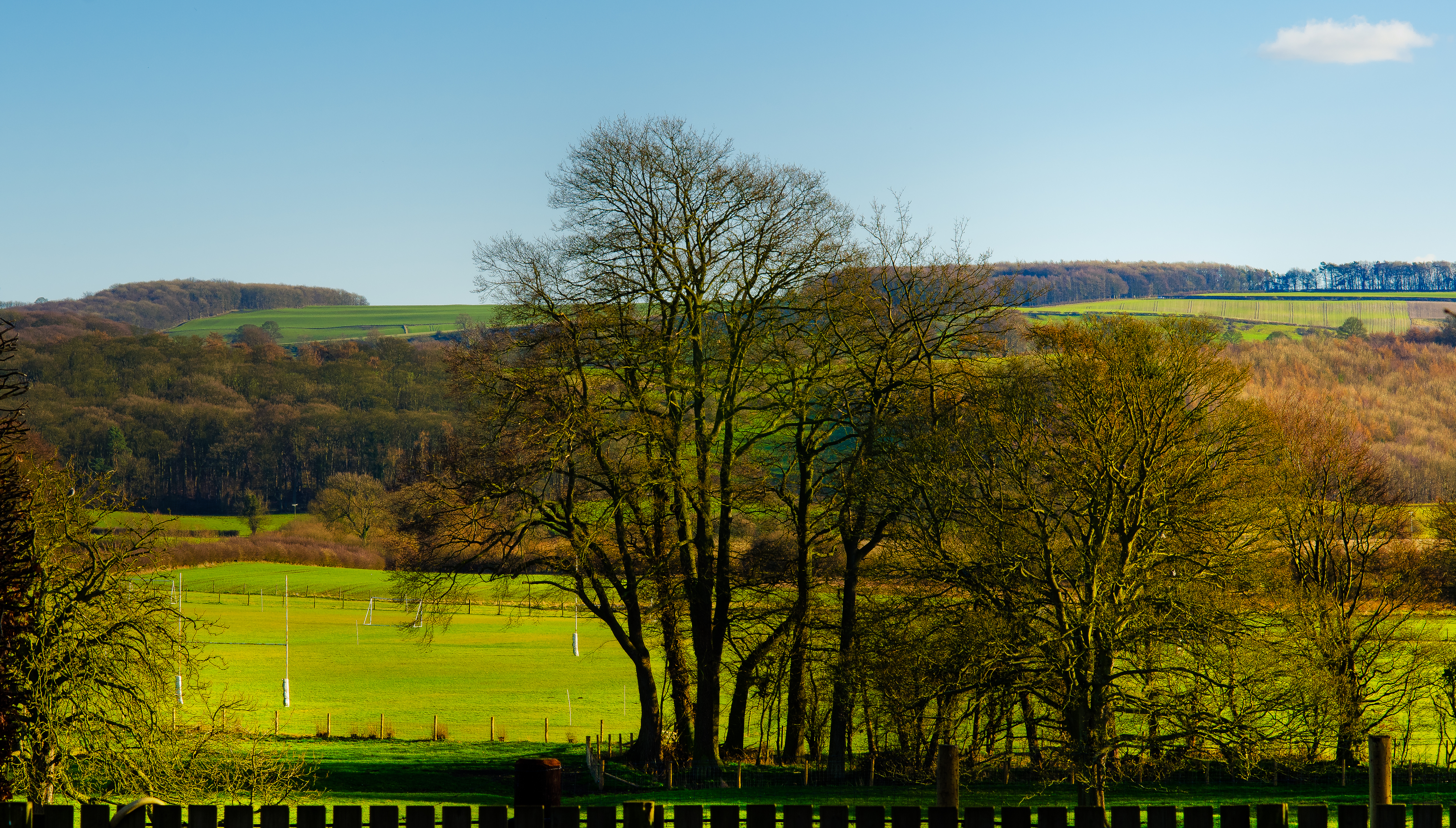
Woodleigh School playing fields

Sports classes were run every day, and pupils, including Tom Hoggard and Jack Garrity, competed at county and national level in football and cricket.

Pupil Matthew Procter, then aged 12, joined the Lord's Taverners 'Centurions Award Hall of Fame'. He made an unbeaten 106 in an 88-run victory over Aysgarth School in a cricket match in July 2010.

== 'Edstat' nutrition education project ==
In 2008 the school developed an educational card game to aid the teaching of nutrition. Pupils created cards to help them learn about the properties of food, and with the help of the Headteacher, they developed this into a Top Trumps style game. The Grocer magazine ran an article about the initiative which aimed to raise funding from public and private sources in order to distribute the game free to every school in the country as part of the national "Year of Food and Farming."

== Notable alumni ==
- Gordon Gibb – CEO of Flamingo Land Ltd and former chairman of Bradford City Football Club.
- Mark Herman – Film director of Brassed Off and The Boy in the Striped Pyjamas.
- Ralph Ineson – Actor who appeared in the Harry Potter films, playing Amycus Carrow.
- Henry Priestman – Singer songwriter notable for his work with The Christians.
