= Campaigh =

Campaigh (Gaelic)

Location
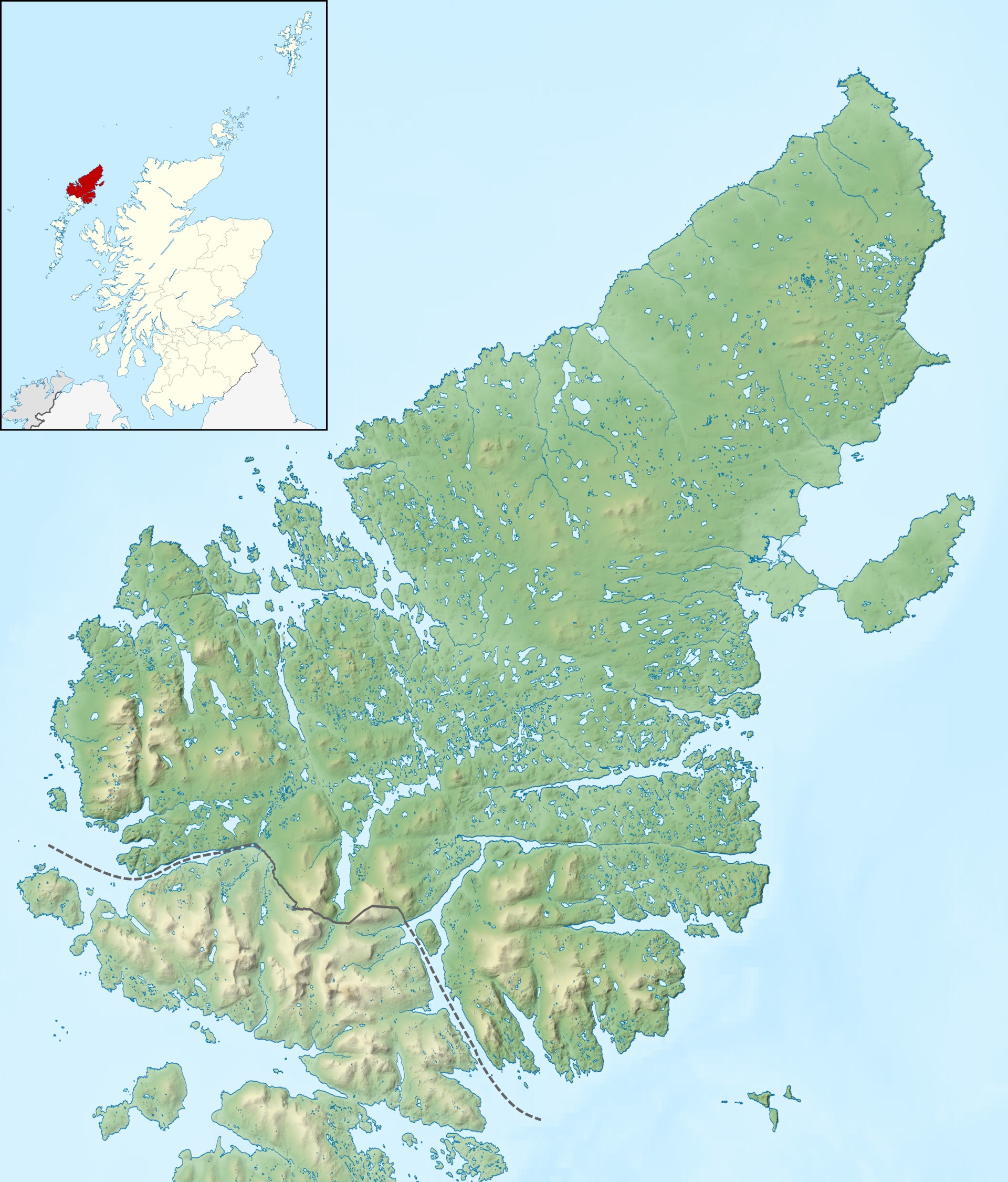
- Campaigh shown next to Lewis Campaigh shown within the Outer Hebrides
- OS grid reference: NB142426
- Coordinates: 58.3°N 6.87°W

Name
- Old Norse name: Kambrey

Physical geography
- Island group: Outer Hebrides
- Area: <10 ha
- Highest elevation: over 20 metres (66 ft)

Administration
- Council area: Comhairle nan Eilean Siar
- Country: Scotland
- Sovereign state: United Kingdom

Campaigh or Campay is a steep and rocky islet in outer Loch Ròg, Lewis, Scotland that lies north of Cealasaigh and Little Bernera.

A huge natural arch transverses the northern half of the island from south west to north east and there is a large sea cave to the south. The islet of Cùl Champaigh lies offshore to the north, and tiny Sgeir Dearg (red skerry) and the larger Màs Sgeir (seagull skerry) beyond.

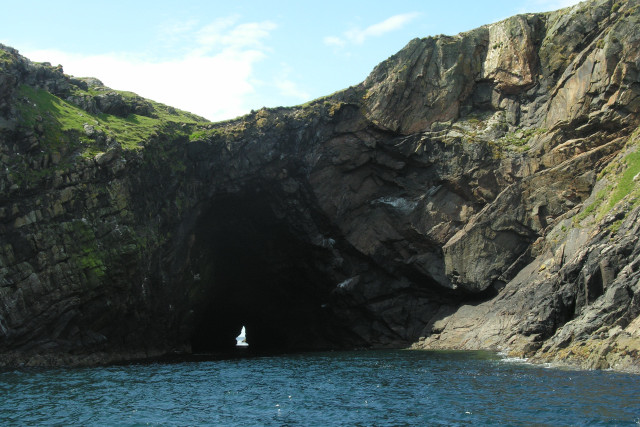
Campaigh's natural arch.jpg
