= St Andrew's Church, Langton =

Church in Langton, North Yorkshire, England

Coordinates: 54°05′36″N 0°47′01″W

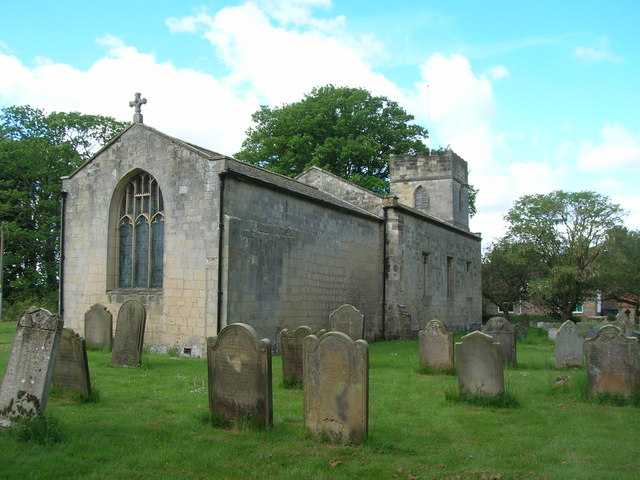
The church, in 2010

St Andrew's Church is the parish church of Langton, North Yorkshire, a village in England.

There was a mediaeval church in Langton. It was rebuilt in 1822, reusing some of the original stones. The church was grade II listed in 1966.

The church is built of sandstone with a stone slate roof, and consists of a nave, a chancel and a west tower. The tower has three stages divided by bands, an arched doorway, a two-light quatrefoil window above, single-light bell openings with pointed heads, and an embattled parapet. Inside, there is a 13th-century rectangular font, and 17th-century panelling. There is a tomb chest memorial to Mary Ingram, who died in 1656, and a couple of memorials from the 1820s.

== See also ==
- Listed buildings in Langton, North Yorkshire
