= Kennythorpe =

Hamlet in North Yorkshire, England

Coordinates: 54.0832°N 0.795842°W

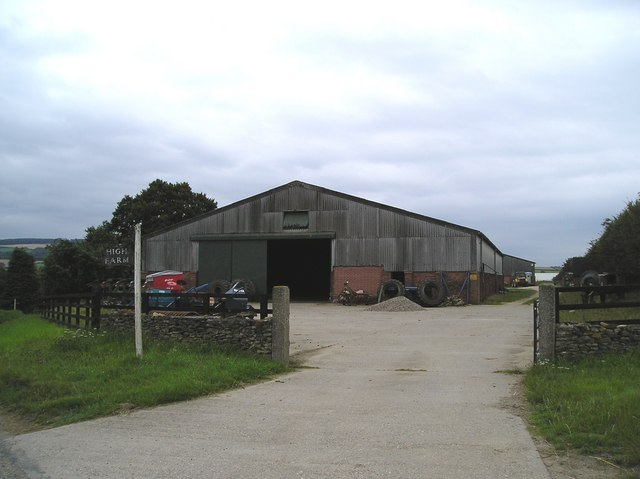
- High Farm

- Location within North Yorkshire
- OS grid reference: SE788659
  - London: 175 mi (282 km) S
- Civil parish: Burythorpe
- Unitary authority: North Yorkshire
- Ceremonial county: North Yorkshire
- Region: Yorkshire and the Humber
- Country: England
- Sovereign state: United Kingdom
- Post town: MALTON
- Postcode district: YO17
- Dialling code: 01656
- Police: North Yorkshire
- Fire: North Yorkshire
- Ambulance: Yorkshire
- UK Parliament: Thirsk and Malton

Kennythorpe is a hamlet in the civil parish of Burythorpe, North Yorkshire, England. It is 4 miles (6 km) south from Malton, and between the village of Langton to the north, and Burythorpe to the south.

It was historically part of the East Riding of Yorkshire until 1974. Between 1974 and 2023 it was part of the Ryedale district. It is now administered by North Yorkshire Council.

Kennythorpe was formerly a township in the parish of Langton, in 1866 Kennythorpe became a separate civil parish, on 1 April 1935 the parish was abolished and merged with Burythorpe. In 1931 the parish had a population of 45.

In 1823 Kennythorpe (then Kennythorp), was in the Wapentake of Buckrose in the East Riding of Yorkshire. Population at the time was 83.

The name Kennythorpe derives from the Old English personal name Cenhere or Cynehere, and the Old Norse þorp meaning 'secondary settlement'.
