= Kelton (surname) =

Kelton is a surname. Notable people with the surname include:

- Aaron Kelton (born 1974), American college football coach.
- Allan C. Kelton (1864–1928), American officer serving in the United States Marine Corps during the Spanish–American War
- Arthur Kelton, (d.1549/1550), British author who wrote in rhyme about Welsh history
- David Kelton (born 1979), former Major League Baseball player
- Elmer Kelton (1926–2009), American journalist and writer
- Fay Kelton, retired Australian stage, radio and television actress
- Flora Kelton (1925–2003), New Zealand artist and sculptor
- Gene Kelton (1953–2010), American guitarist, harmonica player, and singer-songwriter
- James Kelton Jr. (died 1844), American politician from Pennsylvania
- John C. Kelton (1828–1893), American officer in the United States Army
- John G. Kelton, Canadian hematologist and the past Dean of the McMaster University Medical School
- Kevin Kelton (born 1956), former American television writer
- Mark Kelton, former American senior executive of the Central Intelligence Agency
- Pert Kelton, (1907–1968), American vaudeville, movie, radio and television actress.
- Robert Kelton (1908–1996), American blues guitarist and banjo player
- Roy Kelton Orbison (1936–1988), American singer-songwriter
- Stephanie Kelton (born 1969), female American economist and Professor of Public Policy and Economics
