= Listed buildings in Langton, North Yorkshire =

Langton is a civil parish in the county of North Yorkshire, England. It contains 23 listed buildings that are recorded in the National Heritage List for England. All the listed buildings are designated at Grade II, the lowest of the three grades, which is applied to "buildings of national importance and special interest". The parish contains the estate village of Langton and the surrounding countryside. Apart from a grandstand converted into a farmhouse, all the listed buildings are in the village. Most of these are houses, cottages and associated structures, farmhouses and farm buildings, and the others consist of a church and a telephone kiosk.

== Buildings ==
Name and location	Photograph	Date	Notes
Langton Hall; 54.09446°N 0.77746°W		1738	A country house that has been extended and converted into a school. It is in limestone, sandstone and white brick, with roofs of pantile and Westmorland slate. There are two storeys, a main range with five bays, and a slightly recessed three-bay wing on the left. On the front of the main range is a porch, now enclosed, with square pilasters, and a doorway with a fanlight. In the north wing is a doorway with a lintel and a dated and initialled keystone. The windows are sashes, some horizontally-sliding.
Green Farmhouse; 54.09400°N 0.78267°W		Mid 18th century	The house is in limestone, and has a pantile roof with gable coping and shaped kneelers. There are two storeys and two bays. The central doorway has a divided fanlight, and the windows are sashes, those in the ground floor under segmental brick arches, and in the upper floor with wooden lintels.
Ivy Cottage; 54.09382°N 0.78408°W	—	18th century (probable)	The house is in limestone with Welsh slate roof. There are two storeys, three bays, and an outshut on the left. There is a blocked doorway in the outshut, and the windows are casements.
Norcliffe Arms; 54.09421°N 0.77943°W		Mid 18th century	A public house, later a private house, in limestone with a pantile roof and gable coping. There are two storeys, two bays and an outshut on the left. The doorway is in the centre, and the windows in the house are horizontally-sliding sashes, all under segmental arches. In the outshut is a casement window.
The Old Cottage; 54.09429°N 0.77910°W	—	Mid 18th century	The cottage is in limestone, and has a pantile roof with gable coping and shaped kneelers. There are two storeys, four bays, a service wing to the left, and a cross-wing at the rear. The doorway in the main block and the doorway in the service wing both have lintels with keystones. The windows are casements.
West Wold Old Farmhouse; 54.10509°N 0.76765°W	—	Mid 18th century	Originally the grandstand for a racecourse, it was later converted into a farmhouse. It is in limestone, and has a Westmorland slate roof with gable coping and shaped kneelers. There are two storeys and four bays. The doorways are blocked and the windows are sashes, all with wedge lintels.
Carriers Farmhouse; 54.09384°N 0.78167°W		Late 18th century	A brick house with a Welsh slate roof, gable coping and shaped kneelers. There are two storeys and three bays, and lower flanking wings with two storeys and two bays. In the main block is a central doorway and sash windows, those in the ground floor with wedge lintels. The wings each contains a doorway, with a segmental window outside, and above is a horizontally-sliding sash window.
The Post Office; 54.09423°N 0.77931°W	—	Late 18th century	The house is in limestone, and has a pantile roof with gable coping and a shaped kneeler on the right. There are two storeys and two bays. The doorway is to the left, with a two horizontally-sliding sash windows and a casement window to the right, all under cambered arches with keystones. In the upper floor are horizontally-sliding sashes.
Town Farmhouse; 54.09327°N 0.78254°W		Late 18th century	The farmhouse is in limestone, and has a pantile roof with gable copings and shaped kneelers. There are two storeys and three bays, and a slightly recessed two-bay service wing to the right. In the centre is a doorway with a triangular pediment, and the windows are casements under segmental arches.
Barn and implement shed, Town Farm; 54.09305°N 0.78302°W	—	Late 18th century	The farm buildings are in limestone with a pantile roof. The barn has six bays, and to the east is the implement shed, with five bays under a catslide roof. The openings are varied.
Stables, Town Farm; 54.09293°N 0.78285°W	—	Late 18th century	The stable block is in limestone, and has a pantile roof with gable copings and shaped kneelers. There are two storeys and four bays. In the ground floor are stable doors under segmental brick arches, and there are slatted openings in both floors.
Block of cottages opposite the Reading Room; 54.09379°N 0.78017°W		1814	A row of five cottages, the right cottage added in 1819. They are in limestone, and have a stone slate roof, hipped to the right. There are two storeys, and each cottage has one bay. The doorways are under segmental arches, the ground floor windows have round-arched heads, and in the upper floor are two-light horizontally-sliding sash windows. On the front are two datestones.
St Andrew's Church; 54.09335°N 0.78357°W		1821–22	The church was rebuilt incorporating earlier material. It is built in sandstone with a stone slate roof, and consists of a nave, a chancel and a west tower. The tower has three stages divided by bands, an arched doorway, a two-light quatrefoil window above, single-light bell openings with pointed heads, and an embattled parapet.
Pair of cottages east of Green Farm; 54.09390°N 0.78230°W		1824	A pair of limestone cottages with a Welsh slate roof. There are two storeys and two bays. In the centre are two doorways, flanked by windows, all with pointed heads. The upper floor contains three-light casement windows, and between them is an initialled datestone.
Milestone Cottage; 54.09382°N 0.78136°W		Early 19th century	The house is in limestone with a Welsh slate roof. There are two storeys and two bays. On the left is a doorway under a segmental arch. The windows are casements, three in the ground floor with pointed heads, and two above with three lights. On the wall is a metal sign with the name of the village and the distances to nearby place.
Post Cottage; 54.09386°N 0.78199°W		Early 19th century	Two houses combined into one, in limestone with a Welsh slate roof. The main block has two storeys and two bays, to the left is a lower two-storey two-bay wing, and to the right is a single-storey single-bay wing. The windows are casements, those in the ground floor of the main block under segmental arches.
Ray Cottage; 54.09382°N 0.78120°W	—	Early 19th century	The cottage is in limestone with a Welsh slate roof. There are two storeys and two bays. The central doorway is flanked by pointed casement windows, and in the upper floor are three-light casements.
The Rectory; 54.09285°N 0.78430°W	—	Early 19th century	The rectory is in limestone with a brick service wing and hipped Welsh slate roofs. The main house has two storeys and three bays, with a single-storey extension to the right, and a two-storey service wing at the rear right. The doorway has an architrave and a cornice on consoles. The windows in the main house are sashes with flat heads, and in the extension they have round arched heads.
Entrance gates to Langton Hall and wall 54.09410°N 0.77941°W		Early to mid 19th century	The entrance to the drive is flanked by square stone gate piers about 3.5 metres (11 ft) high. Each pier has a plain capital, and is surmounted by a greyhound. They are flanked by low walls.
Reading Room Cottage; 54.09398°N 0.78025°W		1841	A school, later a house, in limestone, with a Welsh slate roof, gable coping and shaped kneelers. There is a single storey and two bays. The central doorway is flanked by casement windows with pointed heads, and above it is a datestone.
Cottages to the south of the gates to Langton Hall; 54.09393°N 0.77939°W		1857	A row of three cottages in limestone with a stone slate roof. There are two storeys, and each cottage has two bays. On the front are three doorways, and casement windows, those in the ground floor with pointed heads. Also on the front is a datestone.
Witham Cottage; 54.09404°N 0.77994°W		1857	A row of cottages converted into a house, it is in limestone with a Welsh slate roof, gable copings and shaped kneelers. There are two storeys and four bays. On the front is a doorway, casement windows with pointed heads, and an inscription and the date.
Telephone kiosk 54.09382°N 0.78151°W		1935	The K6 type telephone kiosk in Main Street was designed by Giles Gilbert Scott. Constructed in cast iron with a square plan and a dome, it has three unperforated crowns in the top panels.
