= Langton Hall =

Historic building, England

Coordinates: 54°05′40″N 0°46′39″W

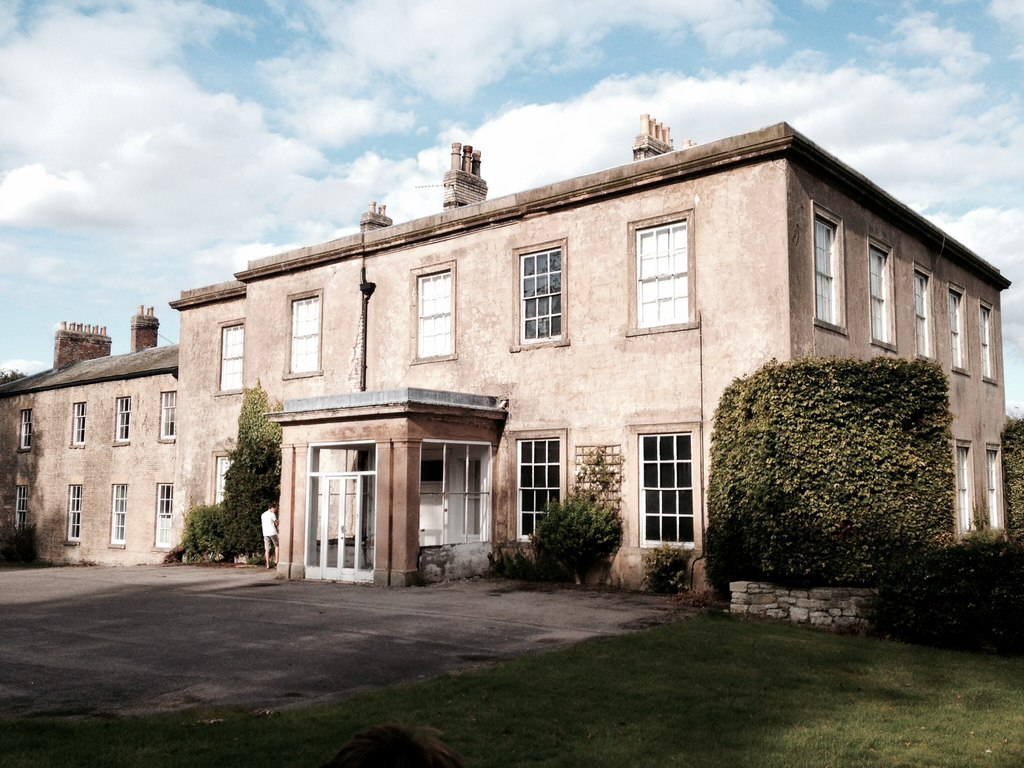
The building, in 2014

Langton Hall is a historic building in Langton, North Yorkshire, a village in England.

The hall was originally constructed in 1738, with the south wing added in about 1840. It was the home of the Norcliffe family, including Isabella Norcliffe, the partner of Anne Lister. The hall was commandeered during World War II and was used as a base for the Guards Armoured Division. In 1946, Woodleigh School moved into the hall. A school building was added to the left end of the hall. The hall was grade II listed in 1951.

The school closed in 2012, and the hall was disused until 2019, when it was converted into an 11-bedroom house, a six-bedroom holiday let in the north wing, and four holiday cottages in the former servants' accommodation. It has 20 acres of grounds, including a waterfall. Part of the television series Gentleman Jack, based on Lister's life, was filmed at the hall.

The house is built of limestone, sandstone and white brick, with roofs of pantile and Westmorland slate. There are two storeys, a main range with five bays, and a slightly recessed three-bay wing on the left. On the front of the main range is a porch, now enclosed, with square pilasters, and a doorway with a fanlight. In the north wing is a doorway with a lintel and a dated and initialled keystone. The windows are sashes, some horizontally-sliding. Inside, there is a wrought iron staircase.

== See also ==
- Listed buildings in Langton, North Yorkshire
