= Norcliffe Norcliffe =

British Army officer and landowner (1791–1862)

Major-General Norcliffe Norcliffe KH
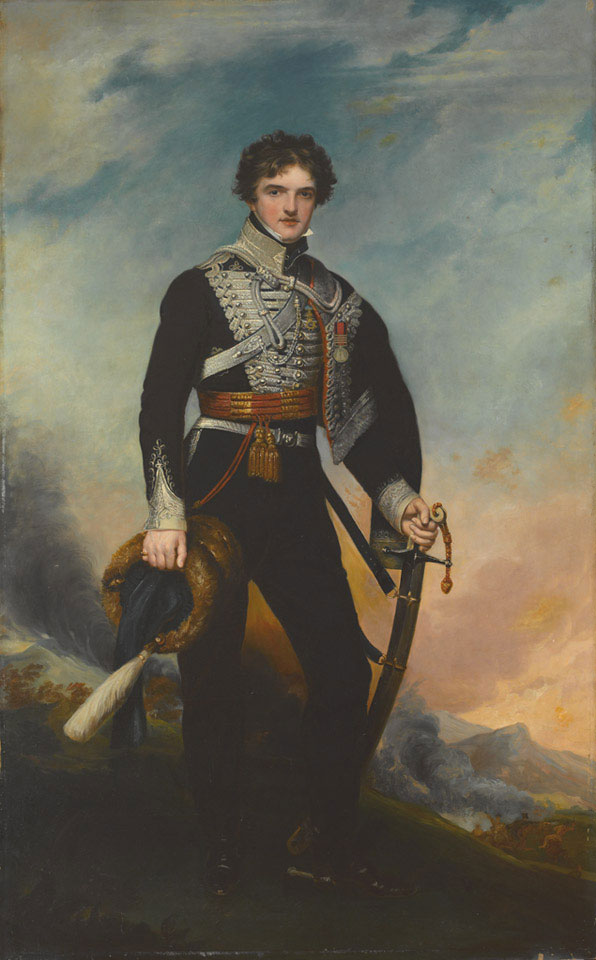
- Portrait by Henry Wyndham Phillips, c. 1845
- Born: Norcliffe Dalton; 24 September 1791; England
- Died: 8 February 1862 (aged 70); London, England
- Burial place: Kensal Green Cemetery
- Spouse: Decima Hester Beatrix Foulis (m. 1824; died 1828)
- Military career
- Allegiance: United Kingdom
- Branch: British Army
- Service years: 1807–1862
- Rank: Major-General
- Units: 4th Dragoons; 17th Lancers; 18th Hussars
- Conflicts: Napoleonic Wars; Peninsular War; Battle of Talavera; Battle of Busaco; Battle of Albuera; Battle of Usagre; Battle of Salamanca (WIA)
- Awards: Knight of the Royal Guelphic Order; Military General Service Medal

Major-General Norcliffe Norcliffe, KH (born Norcliffe Dalton; 24 September 1791 – 8 February 1862) was a British Army officer and landowner. Having joined the 4th Dragoons in 1807, he fought with them in the Peninsular War, and survived a serious head wound at the Battle of Salamanca in 1812. After the war Norcliffe continued to serve in the British army, transferring to the 17th Lancers and then the 18th Hussars before going on half-pay as a major. He continued to purchase promotions and became a major general in 1855. Norcliffe inherited the Langton Hall estate in Yorkshire from his mother in 1835 but chose to live mostly in London, dying there at the age of 70 in 1862.

== Early life ==
Norcliffe Norcliffe was born Norcliffe Dalton on 24 September 1791, the eldest son of Lieutenant-Colonel Thomas Dalton and Anne (née Wilson). Norcliffe had six younger siblings, two brothers and four sisters. His two brothers died at an early age. Norcliffe was commissioned into the British Army on 5 February 1807 at the age of 16, serving as a cornet in the 4th Dragoons. In August 1807, Norcliffe's father changed his surname from Dalton to Norcliffe upon inheriting the Langton Hall estate in Yorkshire from his maternal uncle. Norcliffe was then promoted to lieutenant on 30 April 1808, and from April 1809 served with his regiment in the Peninsular War.

== Peninsular War ==
Norcliffe fought at the Battle of Talavera on 27 July 1809, and then the Battle of Busaco on 27 September 1810, the Battle of Albuera on 16 May 1811, and the Battle of Usagre on 25 May the same year. He was severely wounded in the head at the Battle of Salamanca on 22 July 1812. With the French infantry having been broken, Norcliffe was part of the cavalry charging after them. He became separated from his regiment along with a few members of the 5th Dragoon Guards, and was surrounded by French infantry. As he attempted to fight through this force his horse was shot in the ear and turned around, in which moment Norcliffe was shot in the head. He lost his balance and fell from the horse.

Norcliffe lay on the ground, unable to move, and was found by several French infantrymen who took him prisoner and provided some medical care. The British then continued their advance and pushed the French away from Norcliffe. With his wound possibly mortal, he was brought in for treatment by a surgeon. He was nursed back to health by his cousin Susanna Dalbiac, who was the wife of Norcliffe's commanding officer, Colonel James Charles Dalbiac. (Note: The 4th Dragoons were a popular regiment for Norcliffe's family, with several of his cousins serving in the regiment during the Napoleonic Wars.) While in hospital on 10 August Norcliffe wrote a letter to his father describing the battle, saying:

It was a fine sight to see the [French] running, and as we held our swords over their heads fall down on their knees, drop their muskets, and cry: 'Prisonnier, monsieur.'

Norcliffe continued in the Iberian Peninsula until November. The Napoleonic Wars ended in the following year but Norcliffe stayed in the army and was promoted to captain on 29 February 1816. For his war service he received the Military General Service Medal with four clasps in 1848.

== Later career ==
Norcliffe was promoted to major on 20 August 1821, and then transferred to the 17th Lancers on 20 December. Norcliffe transferred again on 22 May 1823, this time to the 18th Hussars. The 18th had in fact been disbanded in 1821, and Norcliffe had transferred to them to go on half pay for what he described as "peculiar private motives". Norcliffe spent the rest of his army career on half pay, continuing to buy his promotions. He was created a Knight of the Royal Guelphic Order by William IV in 1836. On 10 January the following year he advanced to lieutenant-colonel. Norcliffe then became a colonel on 11 November 1851, before being promoted by seniority to major-general on 31 August 1855. The National Army Museum suggests that Norcliffe stayed in the army despite not actively serving past 1823 because the commissions kept their value and could be used as an investment.

== Retirement and death ==
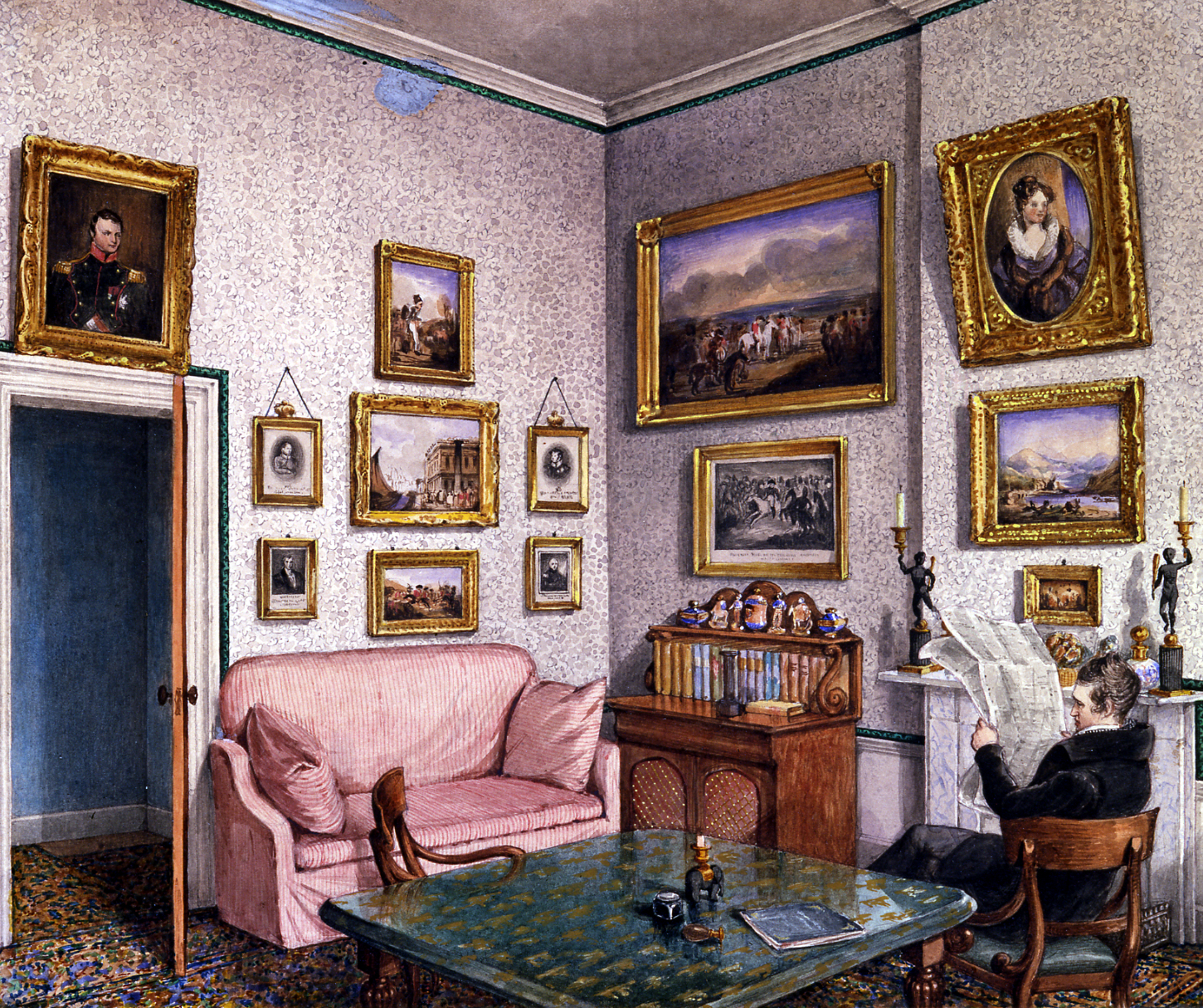
General Norcliffe in his study at Langton Hall, by Mary Ellen Best

Norcliffe inherited Langton Hall from his mother in 1835, but did not stay there often, preferring to instead live in London when he was not partaking in extensive travels of North America and Europe. One of Norcliffe's nieces was the artist Mary Ellen Best, the daughter of his third-born sister Mary. Norcliffe was very close to Best and supported her artistry. She painted a number of scenes of life at Langton Hall and the family there, including some of Norcliffe. In one image Best portrays Norcliffe sitting in his study surrounded by paintings and prints of battles of the Napoleonic Wars, and in another in the dining room having breakfast with his extended family.

Norcliffe married Decima Hester Beatrix Foulis in York on 24 June 1824. The couple had a son, Thomas, in 1825, who died unmarried in 1849. Norcliffe's wife also predeceased him, dying in 1828, and Norcliffe was left without a direct heir. He died in London on 8 February 1862 after an illness of three days, aged 70. He was succeeded by his niece Rosamond Robinson, Best's elder sister, who subsequently changed her surname to Norcliffe by Royal Licence. Norcliffe was buried next to his son in Kensal Green Cemetery.
