= Barbara Hamilton, 14th Baroness Dudley =

British artist and noblewoman (1907–2002)

The Right Honourable The Baroness Dudley
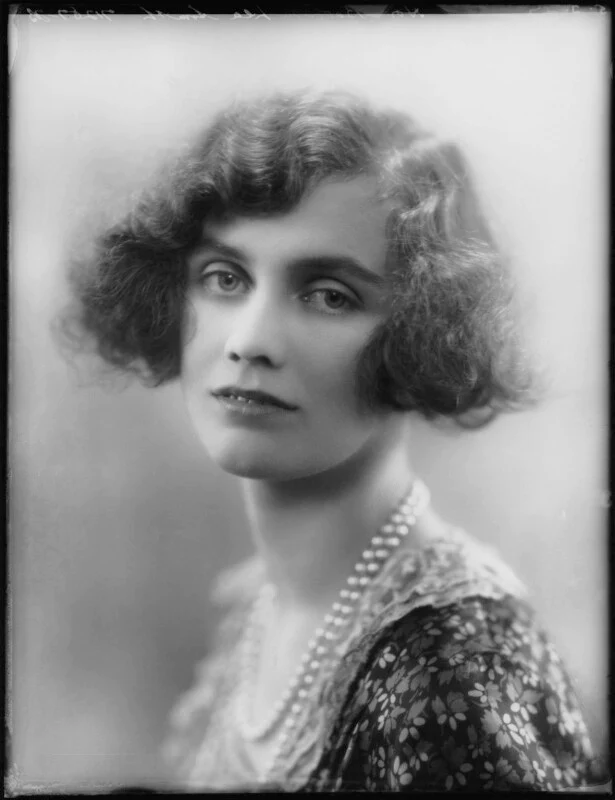
- Baroness Dudley in 1929

Member of the House of Lords Lord Temporal
- In office 19 April 1972 – 11 November 1999; Hereditary Peerage
- Preceded by: The 13th Baron Dudley
- Succeeded by: Seat abolished

Personal details
- Born: Barbara Amy Felicity Smith; 23 April 1907
- Died: 27 May 2002 (aged 95) Kempsey, Worcestershire, England
- Party: Conservative
- Spouses: Guy Wallace (m. 1929; died 1967); Charles Hamilton (m. 1980)
- Children: 4
- Parent: Ferdinando Smith, Baron Dudley (father)

Barbara Amy Felicity Hamilton, 14th Baroness Dudley (née Smith; 23 April 1907 – 27 May 2002) was a British artist and noblewoman who served in the House of Lords from 1972 until 1999 as a member of the Conservative Party.

== Biography ==
Barbara Amy Felicity Smith was born on 23 April 1907. Her father was the 12th Baron Dudley. She was an artist by profession. She was married to Guy Wallace from 22 August 1929 until his death on 16 March 1967, and to Charles Hamilton from 22 February 1980. She had four children, all with the former, and lived in Kempsey in Worcestershire.

After the death of her brother – the 13th Baron Dudley – on 19 April 1972, she inherited the Barony of Dudley and became a member of the House of Lords. A member of the Conservative Party, Dudley gave her maiden speech on 17 March 1976, arguing that "thousands of acres" of unallotted land in Birmingham could instead be used for growing fruits and vegetables. In 1981, she gave a speech in which she argued that the government should aid landlords who were unable to pay for repairs due to low rents. Her last parliamentary speech occurred on 23 July 1990, and regarded the AIDS epidemic. In 1993, Dudley stated she would vote in favor of ratification of the Maastricht Treaty, though she became ill and could not attend the vote. A hereditary peer, Dudley did not stand in the 1999 House of Lords elections, and left office on 11 November 1999.

Dudley died at her home in Kempsey on 27 May 2002. Her funeral was held four days later at the St Denys' Church in Severn Stoke. Her title passed to her eldest son Jim, now the 15th Baron Dudley.

Peerage of England
Preceded by Ferdinando Dudley Henry Lea Smith	Baroness Dudley; 1972–2002	Succeeded by Jim Anthony Hill Wallace
