= Kempsey, Worcestershire =

Village in Worcestershire, England

Coordinates: 52.13909°N 2.21766°W

Kempsey
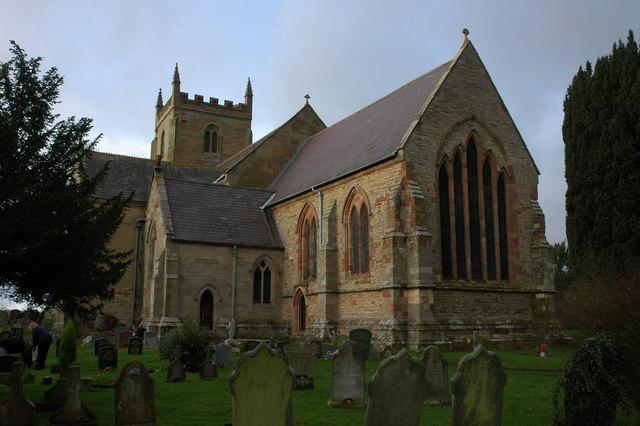
- St Mary's Church, Kempsey

- Location within Worcestershire
- Population: 4,358 (2021 census)
- OS grid reference: SO852490
- Civil parish: Kempsey
- District: Malvern Hills
- Shire county: Worcestershire
- Region: West Midlands
- Country: England
- Sovereign state: United Kingdom
- Post town: Worcester
- Postcode district: WR5
- Police: West Mercia
- Fire: Hereford and Worcester
- Ambulance: West Midlands
- UK Parliament: West Worcestershire

Kempsey is a village and civil parish in the Malvern Hills District in the county of Worcestershire, England. It is bounded by the River Severn on the west, and the A38 main road runs through it and is about 3 miles (5 km) south of Worcester. The parish population was 4,358 in 2021.

The village has a long history. Its name is derived from the Saxon "Kemys' Eye", or the island of Kemys. Kemys was a Saxon chief, whose island lay between marshes and the River Severn. One of the roads in Kempsey, Lyf's Lane, is named after another Saxon chief. The village was recorded in the 11th century Domesday Book as having a value of £7.

The local Anglican church of St Mary was built between the 12th century and 15th centuries, and the 15th-century tower is 82 feet (25 m) tall. The composer Sir Edward Elgar lived in the village from 1923 to 1927, during which time he was made Master of the King's Music. The village has several pubs including one named after Bishop Walter de Cantilupe.

== Overview ==
Kempsey is a fairly large village south of Worcester. Kempsey Playing fields and park are situated at the top of Plovers Rise and the Kempsey common is situated on the other side of the M5 past Bestmans Lane. The community centre is on the main road.

Kempsey Primary School is the village primary school down Elldson lane near the old post office on Post Office Lane and Painters Cottage Nursery. The rocky is a staple of Kempsey located next to St Mary's Church on Church St. North-west of the village is the River Severn, which runs alongside the village.

Pupils from Kempsey Primary School sang on the 1981 re-issue of the Wizzard song "I Wish It Could Be Christmas Everyday". They had also appeared on Roy Wood's solo single "Green Glass Windows" earlier that year. The single reached number 41 on the UK Singles Chart, and was released again in 1984, this time with an additional extended 12-inch version, getting as far as number 23.

== Neighbouring settlements ==
The nearest town to Kempsey is Upton-Upon-Severn, Major town is Malvern. The nearest city to Kempsey is Worcester which is where most residents go for shopping and leisure. The nearest major city is Birmingham in the West Midlands.

== Etymology ==
Kempsey is named after a Saxon chief, Kemys. The full name means "Kemys' Eye", as the original settlement, where the church now stands, was a semi-island between the River Severn and marshland.

== History ==
=== Pre-Roman Kempsey ===
According to 'Kempsey Collection' page 9, a piece of iron dated 1500-800 BC was dug up in the Court Meadow area, and is now in the Foregate Museum, Worcester. At that time the River Severn was tidal at Kempsey, and there was extensive marshland and forest in the Severn valley.

An Iron Age promontory fort can be found by the Severn at Kempsey.

=== Roman Kempsey ===
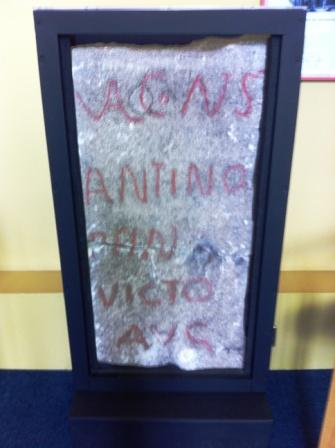
Roman Milestone

A Roman milestone dedicated to the Emperor Constantine the Great (AD 307 – 337) was found in about 1818 when ground was being levelled for a vegetable garden for Court House, opposite the west gate of the churchyard. According to O'Neil, this was probably not its original position as the nearest Roman road was about one mile (2 km) away. It could have previously been used as masonry for the Bishop's Palace due to the lack of suitable building stone in Kempsey.

The Victoria County History entry describes this as "an inscription found some years before 1818, lying in two pieces with other stones 4 feet (1.2 m) deep in the west wall of the kitchen garden of the parsonage farm, north-west of the church. Many of the other stones were cemented together and formed some kind of ancient foundation; whether the inscription was one of these, is not recorded. It is itself a flat slab of freestone, 33 inches (840 mm) high by 20 inches (510 mm) wide, and is now in the Worcester Museum. It reads as follows:

Val(erio) Constantine P(io) fe(lici) invicto Aug(usto)
'Emperor Valerius Constantinus, pious, fortunate, unconquerable, Augustus.'

"Probably the commencement of the inscription is lost; it may have begun IMP. CAES FL. Imp(eratori) Cs(ari) Fl(avio). Flavius Valerius Constantinus was Constantine the Great, and this stone was presumably set up in his reign (A.D. 308-337). It appears to be a milestone, or rather a road-stone, of the type common in the fourth century, in which the mileage was often omitted - though here it might have been broken off. But it might conceivably be no more than an honorary slab."

The stone is from the Oolites of the Cotswold Hills. It is 3 feet (910 mm) high, 19 1/2 inches (500 mm) broad and 7 1/2 inches (190 mm) thick.

==== Roman Villas ====
According to Dr. J.K. St. Joseph, writing in The Journal of Roman Studies, in a section on Roman Villas, "At Kempsey (SO 848485), four miles south of Worcester, two rectangular ditched enclosures seem to belong to the same class" (i.e. Villa enclosures having slightly curved sides). "One, which measures about 250 ft. by 100 ft., has a single entrance in the middle of the short eastern side, while two of the sides are curved, the southern being bowed inwards."

==== Roman roads through and near Kempsey ====
There are three possible Roman roads through and near Kempsey. One may have run along Old Road South, entering the oldest area of the village where a Roman camp might have been, and exiting possibly along Lyf's Lane (although Lyf was a Saxon chief) and continuing to the Roman settlement at Worcester.

The second runs along the side of the present M5 motorway north by Holdings Lane to Taylor's Lane, where it enters St Peter the Great, Worcester.

The third, Green Street, connects Kempsey Common with the centre of the village, crossing the second Roman road mentioned above at Palmer's Cross.

==== Roman finds from archeological digs ====
Pottery, brooches and a coin from the time of the Emperor Nero were found in burial cists dug out of the gravel beds north of the church.

=== Celtic tribe ===
The Celtic tribe that lived around Kempsey in Roman times were the Dobunni.

== Dark Ages ==
Kempsey was part of the Anglo-Saxon Kingdom of Hwicce, and then a part of the Kingdom of Mercia.

=== The King of Mercia and Kempsey Monastery ===
Coenwulf, King of Mercia, gave Abbot Balthun of Kempsey Monastery thirty smallholdings in return for the military service and maintenance work of Kempsey locals, according to the Victoria County History of Worcestershire.

An archaeological dig in 2011 at the top of the bank between the church and the river excavated 42 skeletons and left more in place, and carbon 14 dating of four skeletons gave a range between the 9th and the 13th centuries A.D. The field team found skeletons from a cross-section of the local population including males, females and children. According to a speech by Tom Vaughn of the archaeology society in May 2012, there were skeletons with an age range of approximately 12 to 70 years old, and there were so many skeletons that in one place they were buried seven deep. In those days the Bishop's palace and Anglo-Saxon minster sent priests out to local parishes preaching and converting, because the country had reverted to paganism after the Romans left. The dead were brought from a wide area to Kempsey for burial, because the only Christian consecrated grounds in the area were at Kempsey and at Worcester Cathedral. As other local parishes developed there was less need for this, and Kempsey church's graveyard therefore contracted to its present size.

=== Danish Raiders ===
To commemorate the departure of the Danes Bishop Aelhun built an oratory dedicated to St. Andrew. Then the Danes raided again, and the monastery was destroyed.

In 799 AD the population was about 150.

=== The Domesday Book ===
The Domesday Book says of Kempsey:

In the Hundred (Oswaldslow) The Bishop of the same Churche (Worcester) holds Chemesege (Kempsey) . There are 24 hides paying geld, 5 of these are waste. There are 2 ploughs in the demesne, 13 villeins, and 27 bordars with 16 ploughs. There is a priest, 4 serfs and 2 bondswomen and 40 acres of meadow. The woodland is a mile long and ½ a mile wide. There are 13 hides in the demesne. In the time of King Edward it was worth £16, its present value is £8.

=== Medieval Times ===
==== Royal Visits ====
King Henry II of England (visited 1186)

King Henry III of England (visited in 1265). On 2 August 1265 Henry III was brought as a prisoner to Kempsey by Simon de Montfort, Earl of Leicester and leader of the English barons. Bishop Walter de Cantelupe (who the pub known as "Walls" is named after) said Mass for him in Kempsey church the next morning, before they set off to the Battle of Evesham, where de Montfort was killed.

King Edward I of England (visited 1276) & with Queen Marguerite (26 December 1281)

==== The Black Death ====
The population of Kempsey fell from 600 in 1299 to only 86 in 1327.

==== Beheading ====
In 1303, the Reeve (the Lord's official on the manor) of Kempsey beheaded John de Draycote, a clerk, on the highway between Kempsey and Draycote, by order of the bishops bailiff. His head was placed before the Bishop's Palace gates, causing a riot, which was put down.

==== Alexander Neckham ====
Alexander Neckham, Abbot of Cirencester, was born on the same night as Richard the Lion-heart, and was brought up as his foster-brother. He was the first Englishman to write about chess, silkworms and the mariner's compass. He died at Kempsey in 1217, while visiting his friend Bishop Silvester.

=== Civil War ===
The English Civil War started in 1642, and Kempsey was quickly involved. On 22 September Colonel Nathaniel Fiennes and Colonel Samuel Sandys, Governor of Worcester, led a detachment of Lord Essex's Parliamentary Army across the Severn at Pixham Ferry. The forces of Prince Rupert beat them at the Battle of Powick Bridge on Powick Ham, and many of the fugitives re-crossed the river at Kempsey. However, Green writes that the victory went to the Roundheads, and that Prince Rupert was forced to flee.

Kempsey was raided on 2 July 1646, in an attempt to capture a Colonel Betsworth in his quarters. He was forewarned and eluded capture. According to Rev. Purton, "During the siege of Worcester in 1646, a squadron of 400 dragoons, under Colonel Betsworth, was quartered at Kempsey and on 2 July an attempt was made by the garrison to seize him there, which was unsuccessful." John Noake speaks of a tradition then current in the parish that Cromwell "personally superintended the battering down of the old church, and flattened the nose of every statue then and there lying." There are bullet marks of the south side of the Church tower.

=== Victorian era ===
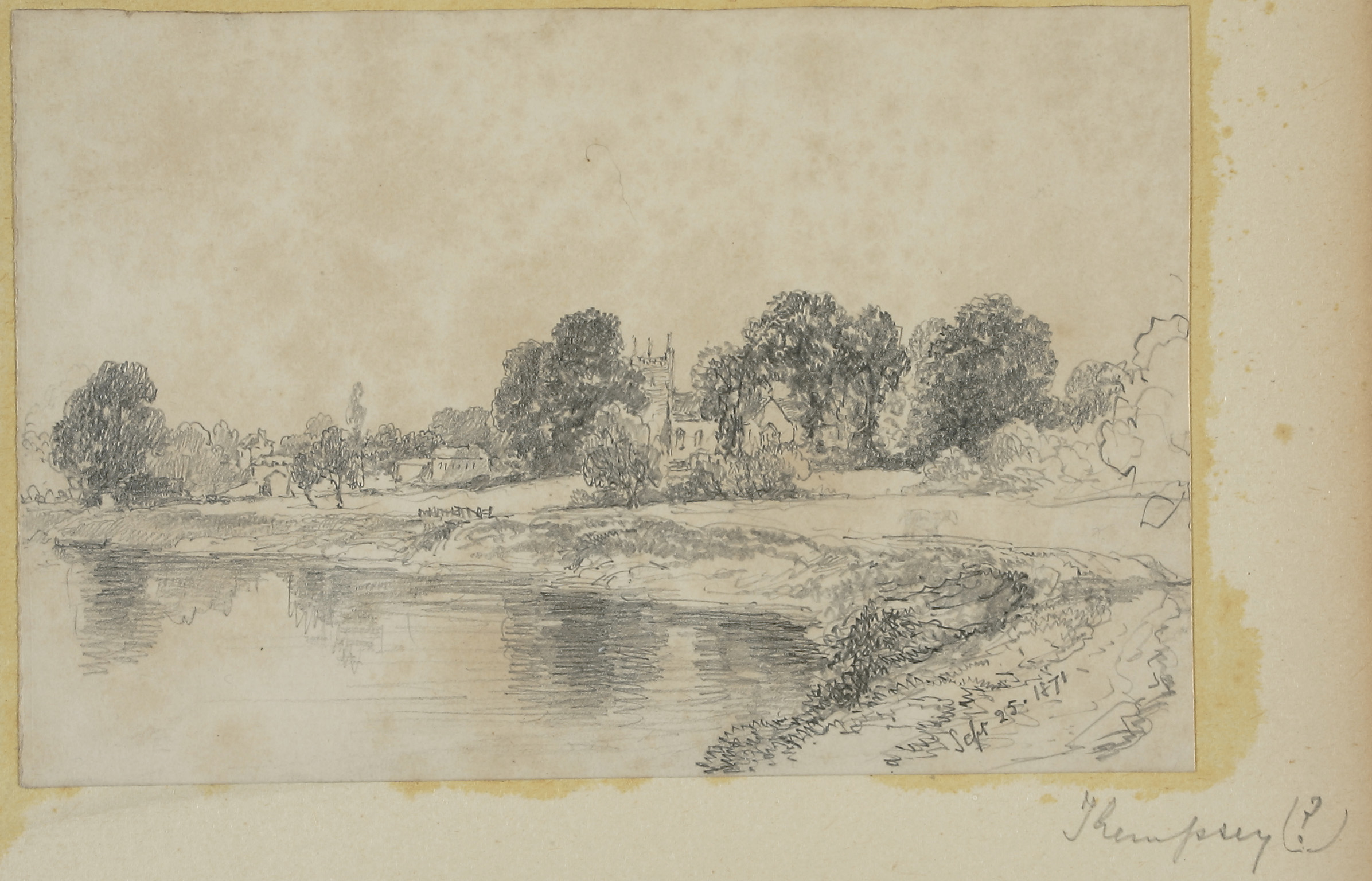
Kempsey in 1871, by Henry Harris Lines

==== Wrecking of the Revolutionary Elm ====
"In June on Whitsunday afternoon 1897 "The Revolutionary Elm" was wrecked by a sudden storm. It was probably the last of the trees planted to celebrate the events of 1688." Note: this was the Glorious Revolution of 1688-9, when the catholic King James II fled and the Protestant William of Orange (husband of the King's elder daughter Mary) was invited by parliament to be King William III of England.

== Civil parish ==
Kempsey civil parish includes the settlements of Baynhall, Broomhall, Clerkenleap, Green Street, Kerswell Green, Napleton and Stonehall.

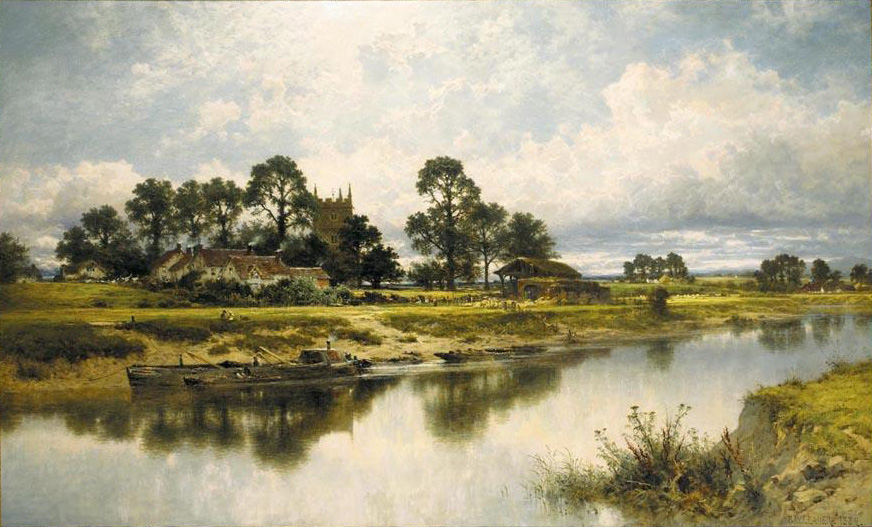
Severn Side, Sabrina's Stream at Kempsey on the River Severn, by B.W.Leader

== Notable people ==
Richard Moon (1814–1899) Chairman of the London and North Western Railway from June 1861 until he retired on 22 February 1891 lived in Kempsey from 1847 to 1848.

In 1918 Lieutenant Robert Vaughan Gorle of Napleton (an area of Kempsey parish) won the Victoria Cross on 1 October.

The composer Sir Edward Elgar (1857–1934), lived in Kempsey from April 1923 to October 1927.

Sir Richard Temple, 1st Baronet and his son, Richard Carnac Temple, both owned "The Nash", an estate near to Kempsey. The latter sold it in 1926 because of ill-health and financial difficulties.

Barbara Hamilton, 14th Baroness Dudley lived in Kempsey until her death in 2002.

== Sources ==
- Pevsner, Nikolaus; Brookes, Alan (2007), Worcestershire, The Buildings of England (Revised ed.), London: Yale University Press, ISBN 9780300112986, OL 10319229M
