= Kelton House =

Kelton House may refer to:

- Kelton House (Hartville, Missouri), listed on the NRHP in Wright County, Missouri
- Kelton House Museum and Garden, a house museum in Columbus, Ohio
