= Kenneggy Downs =

Coordinates: 50.1129°N 5.4044°W

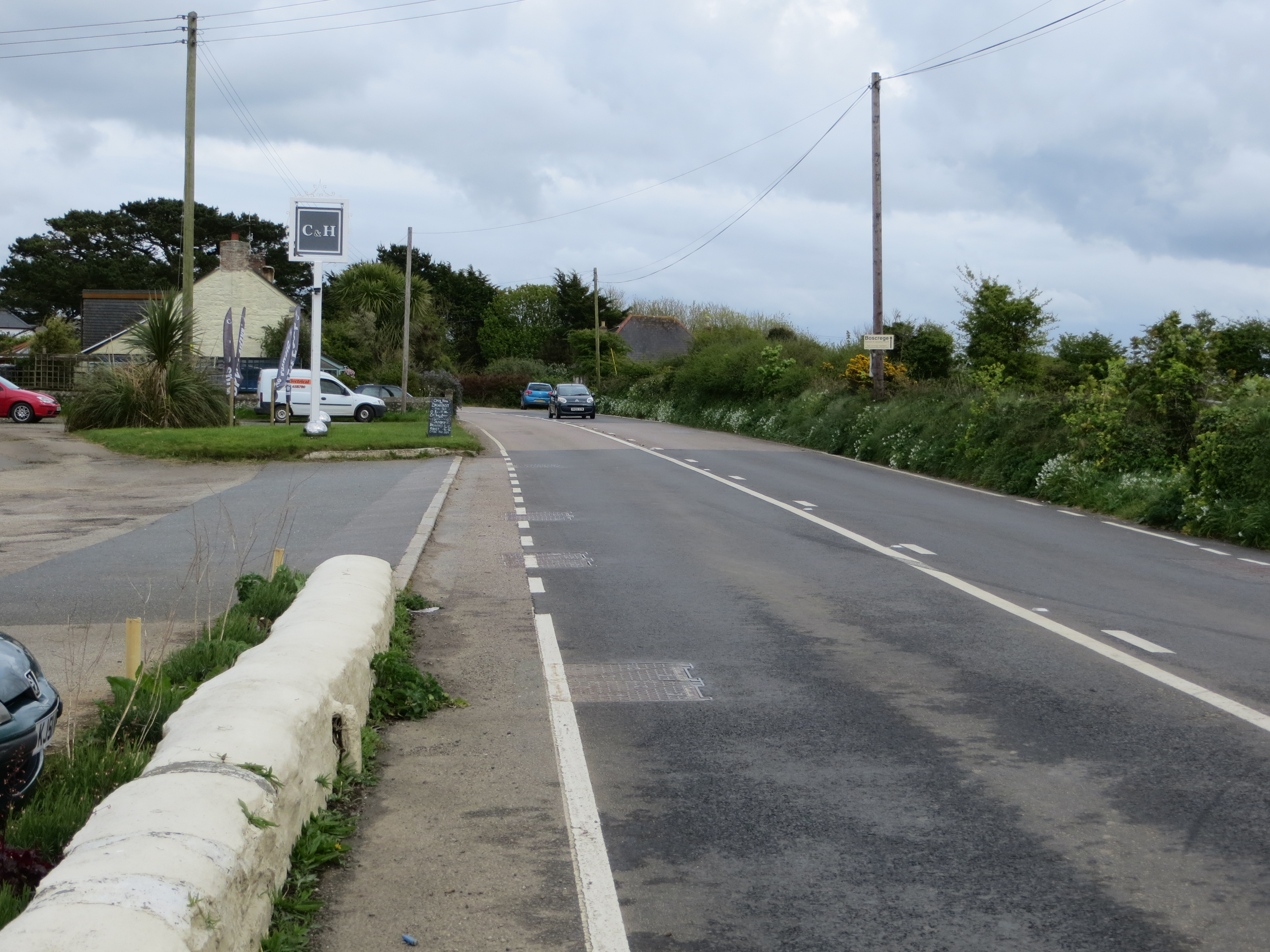
- A394 at the Coach and Horses

- Location within Cornwall
- OS grid reference: SW570291
- Civil parish: Breage
- Unitary authority: Cornwall
- Ceremonial county: Cornwall
- Region: South West
- Country: England
- Sovereign state: United Kingdom
- Police: Devon and Cornwall
- Fire: Cornwall
- Ambulance: South Western
- UK Parliament: St Ives

Kenneggy Downs is a hamlet on the A394, in the civil parish of Breage, between the towns of Helston and Penzance in Cornwall, UK. It is 5 miles (8.0 km) east of Penzance. Kenegy is Cornish for bogs.

The Grade II listed, 18th-century public house the Coach and Horses was extended in the 19th century and was originally an inn on the turnpike between Penryn and Penzance. Built into the fireplace is a circa, early 19th-century granite milestone with the inscription ″From Helston 1".

On 3 September 1879 a tenement was sold by auction at Kanneggie Downs. Kenneggy Downs is north of the twin hamlets of Kenneggy.

There is also a Kenegie at Gulval, near Penzance.
