= Kerthen Wood =

Hamlet in Cornwall, England

Coordinates: 50°09′01″N 5°23′03″W

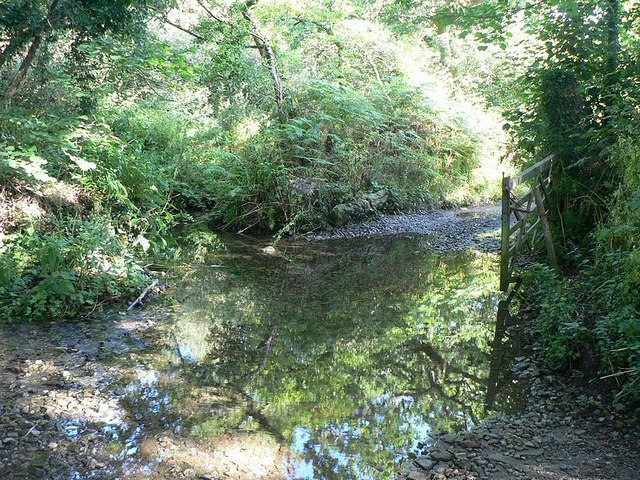
A ford by Kerthen Wood Haven

Kerthen Wood, or Kirthen Wood, is a hamlet near Townshend in Cornwall, England. It is in the civil parish of Crowan
