= Kerswell Green =

Village in Worcestershire, England

Coordinates: 52.118101°N 2.203875°W

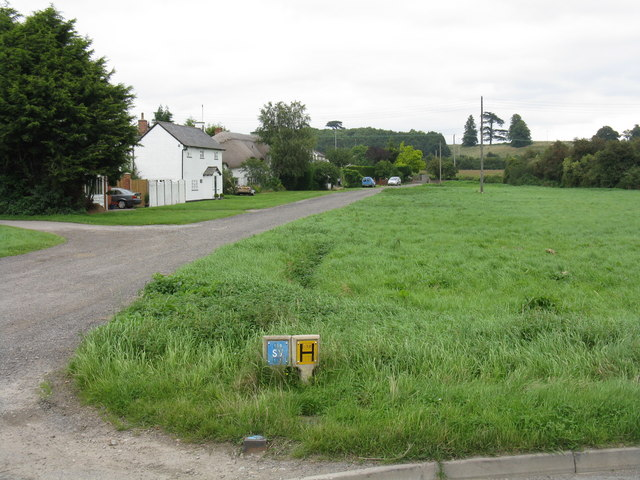
- Row of houses

- Location within Worcestershire
- OS grid reference: SO861466
- District: Malvern Hills
- Shire county: Worcestershire
- Region: West Midlands
- Country: England
- Sovereign state: United Kingdom
- Post town: WORCESTER
- Postcode district: WR5
- Police: West Mercia
- Fire: Hereford and Worcester
- Ambulance: West Midlands

Kerswell Green is a village in the Malvern Hills District of Worcestershire, England. It is within the civil parish of Kempsey.

Kerswell Green Farmhouse is a Grade II listed timber-framed, painted brick building dating from late medieval times and extended in the 17th century. The listing details show it as gable ended and with a thatched roof.

St John the Baptist, Church of England was built circa 1884 as a chapel of ease or mission church to Kempsey parish church. It is closed for worship.

On 23 July 1933, there was a dispute over the erection of a fence barring a footpath. Some parishioners wanted to enforce a claimed right of way but were met with determined opposition. The report in the Evesham Standard said two palings were wrenched off the fence but the attackers were forced to retreat. Two policemen observed the proceedings and one tried to act as a peacemaker. A degree of calm ensued while one policeman rescued a cat trapped up a tree. After the respite, the fence was breached, but soon re-erected. An inquiry had been held earlier in the year by Upton District Council but the matter rested owing to insufficient proof of the existence of a right of way.

In 2009 approval was given to replace a septic tank serving seven houses with a sewage treatment works.

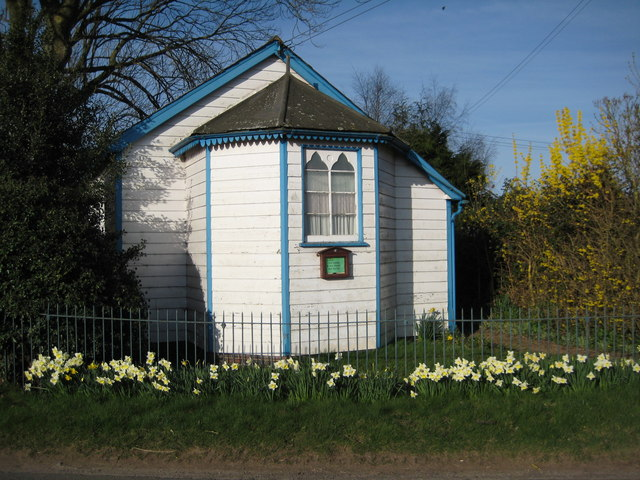
Kerswell Green Church
