= Flora Kelton =

New Zealand artist, sculptor and jeweler (1925–2003)

- Born: Flora Chapman-Taylor; 4 August 1925; Auckland, New Zealand
- Died: 2003 (aged 77–78)
- Known for: Fine Arts and Sculpture
- Spouse: Herbert Maxwell Kelton (mar. 1944)

Flora Kelton (née Chapman-Taylor, 1925–2003) was a New Zealand artist and sculptor influenced by the Brutalist art style.

== Biography ==
Flora Kelton was born on 4 August 1925 at St. Helen's Hospital, in Auckland, New Zealand, to James Walter Chapman-Taylor and Dorothy Joan Pocock (née Lucas). She was the couple's second child together, and Chapman-Taylor's seventh child.

Kelton reflected on her early years in a letter to her elder brother, Ray Chapman-Taylor, written in 1990:

When I hit the scene in 1925 life in Auckland was tough, I believe, but my memory of the earliest years is most happy. Even at two or three years, a lot of the problems the parents endured went well over the top of my fuzzy blonde top and I see these days, until my dear mother died, as contented, happy times - plenty of affection from parents and a harmonious and usually cheerful atmosphere prevailed.

She and her siblings were frequently involved in the local arts and culture scene during their childhood, with records demonstrating Flora's involvement in a performance of The Patchwork Quilt at an amateur drama festival in Wellington, New Zealand, in 1934.

Historic newspapers of the period additionally mention instances of Flora and her elder sister, Ella, participating in dances at social events. Both girls attended dancing classes throughout childhood.

Kelton's mother, Dorothy Joan Pocock, died from pneumonia in March 1938 when Flora was twelve years old.

Flora married Herbert Maxwell Kelton in 1944, assuming his surname for the remainder of her professional career. The couple's first child, Susan, was born three years later in 1947.

== Artistic influences ==
Kelton's father was heavily influenced by the Arts and Crafts movement in his own architectural practice, and it is possibly in response to this that Kelton leaned into Brutalism.

The artist studied fine art at the Wellington Technical School of Art, and was inspired by the emerging Brutalist style of architecture.

Becoming popular in the 1950s and 1960s, the Brutalist aesthetic placed emphasis on simple, block-like shapes and construction from raw materials such as metal and concrete.

Much of Kelton's work has been photographed, and is included in the Revelle Jackson Collection.
