= Keasden =

Hamlet in North Yorkshire, England

Coordinates: 54.09466°N 2.42620°W

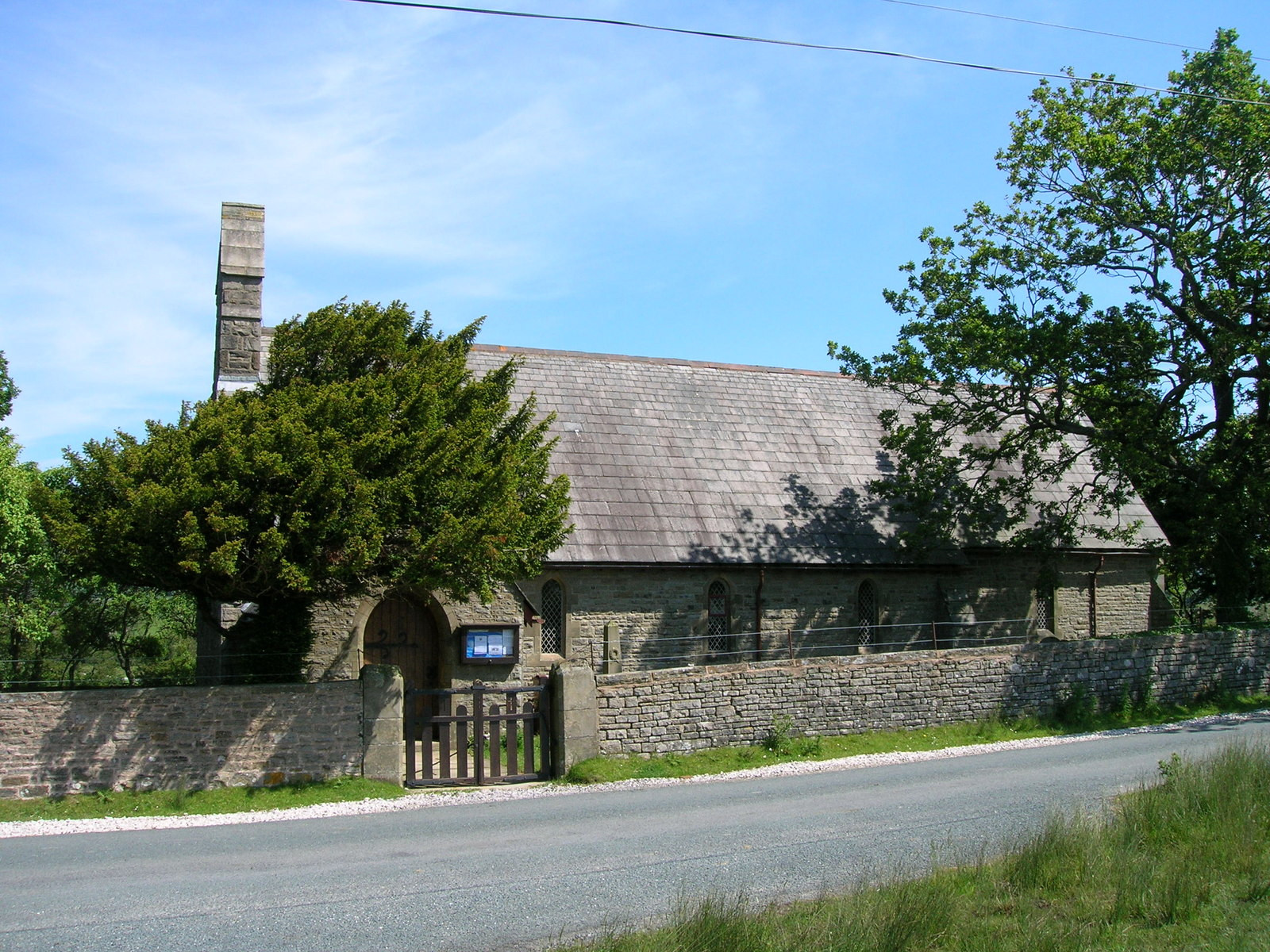
- Keasden Church

- Location within North Yorkshire
- OS grid reference: SD722666
- Civil parish: Clapham-cum-Newby
- Unitary authority: North Yorkshire
- Ceremonial county: North Yorkshire
- Region: Yorkshire and the Humber
- Country: England
- Sovereign state: United Kingdom
- Postcode district: LA2
- Dialling code: 01524
- Police: North Yorkshire
- Fire: North Yorkshire
- Ambulance: Yorkshire
- UK Parliament: Skipton and Ripon

Keasden is a hamlet in the civil parish of Clapham-cum-Newby, in the county of North Yorkshire, in the north-western England. It is about 2 miles (3.2 km) to the south west of the village of Clapham and about 5 miles (8 km) to the east of Bentham. The hamlet sits on an unclassified road and is surrounded to the north, south and west by woodland. Keasden has a church but no schools. The postcode is LA2.

Until 1974 it was part of the West Riding of Yorkshire. From 1974 to 2023 it was part of the Craven District, it is now administered by the unitary North Yorkshire Council.
