= Kenneggy =

Coordinates: 50.1089°N 5.4074°W

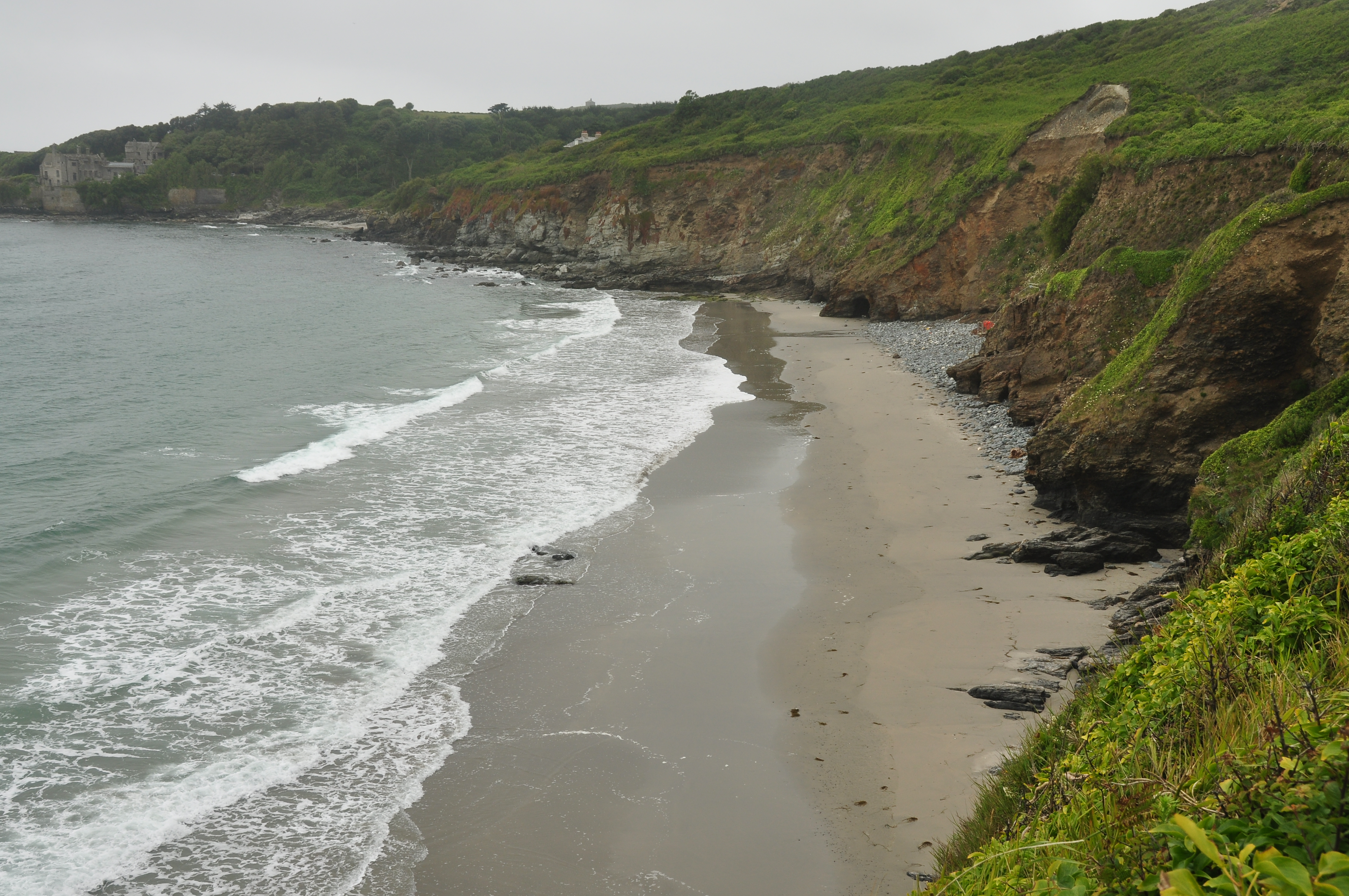
- Kenneggy Sands

- Location within Cornwall
- Civil parish: Breage
- Unitary authority: Cornwall
- Ceremonial county: Cornwall
- Region: South West
- Country: England
- Sovereign state: United Kingdom
- Police: Devon and Cornwall
- Fire: Cornwall
- Ambulance: South Western

Kenneggy comprises two separate hamlets, Higher Kenneggy (Cornish: Keunegi Wartha) to the west and Lower Kennegy (Cornish: Keunegi Woles) to the east, in the west of the civil parish of Breage, Cornwall, England, UK. They are situated 5 miles (8.0 km) east of the town of Penzance.

To the south is the beach of Kenneggy Sands, and to the north is the hamlet of Kenneggy Downs.

The name Kenneggy is an anglicisation of the Cornish language keunegi, which means 'reed beds'.
