= Kersbrook Cross =

Coordinates: 50.552°N 4.387°W

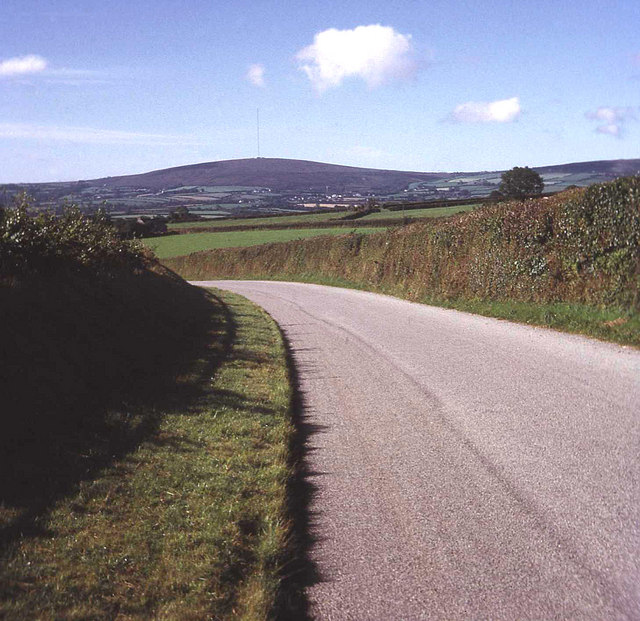
- A lane near Kersbrook Cross (Caradon Hill in the distance)

- Location within Cornwall
- OS grid reference: SX310752
- Civil parish: Linkinhorne
- Unitary authority: Cornwall
- Ceremonial county: Cornwall
- Region: South West
- Country: England
- Sovereign state: United Kingdom
- Post town: Callington
- Postcode district: PL17 8

Kersbrook Cross is a hamlet in the parish of Linkinhorne (where the population for the 2011 census was included) in Cornwall, England. It is on the B3257 road from Plusha to Callington.
