= Keltybridge =

Coordinates: 56.14328°N 3.38721°W

Keltybridge: Scottish Gaelic: Drochaid Chailtidh
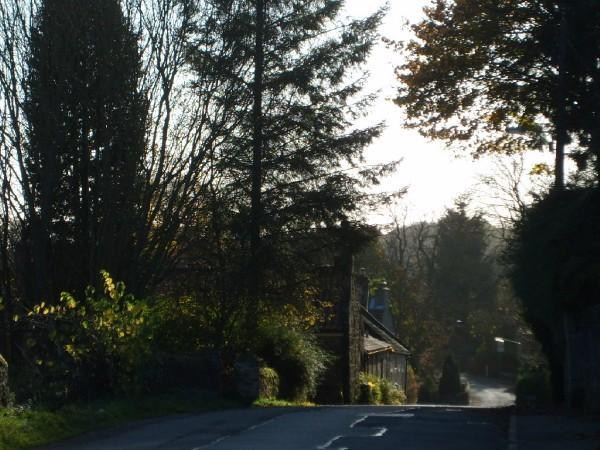
- Looking down towards Keltybridge (2009)

- Location within Perth and Kinross
  - Edinburgh: 14.2 mi (23 km)
  - London: 345 mi (555 km)
- Council area: Perth and Kinross
- Lieutenancy area: Perth and Kinross
- Country: Scotland
- Sovereign state: United Kingdom
- Post town: KELTY
- Postcode district: KY4
- Dialling code: 01383
- Police: Scotland
- Fire: Scottish
- Ambulance: Scottish

Keltybridge (Scottish Gaelic: Drochaid Chailtidh) is a village in Perth and Kinross, Scotland, about one mile north of Kelty, which is across the Fife border. It stands on the northern banks of Kelty Burn.

The sites of two coal pits and an engine house depicted on the first edition of the Ordnance Survey 6-inch map (Fife & Kinross, 1856, sheet 30), to the west of Kelty Bridge are now occupied by a modern house.

Kelty Bridge is a Category B listed structure.

== Gallery ==
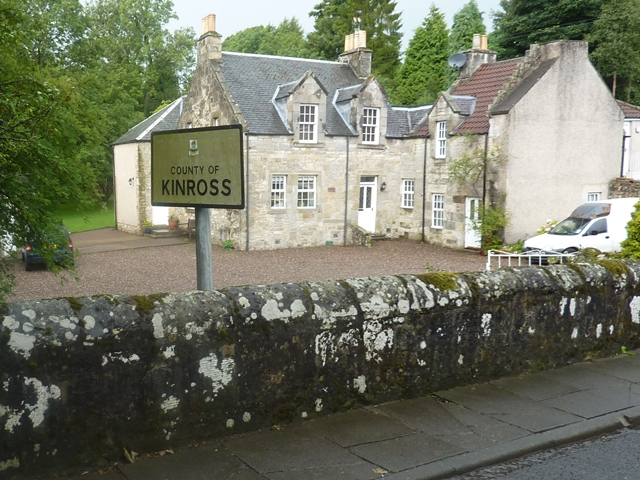
Kinross border
