= Ceallasaigh Beag =

Island in the Outer Hebrides, Scotland

Ceallasaigh Beag (Gaelic)
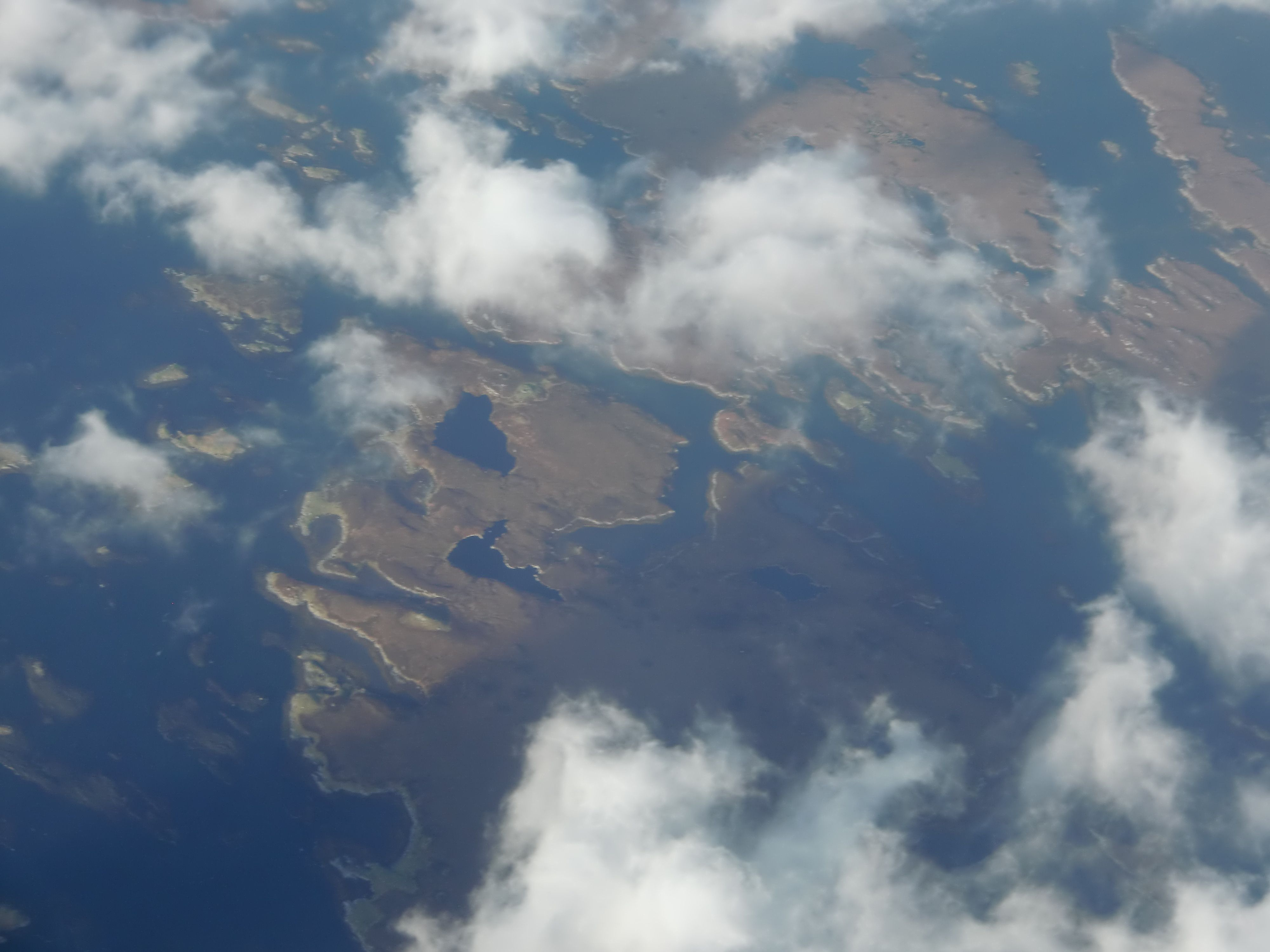
- Ceallasaigh Beag from the air, Ceallasaigh Mòr is at the top of the picture, partly obscured by clouds, the Aisgernis peninsula of mainland North Uist is at top right

Location
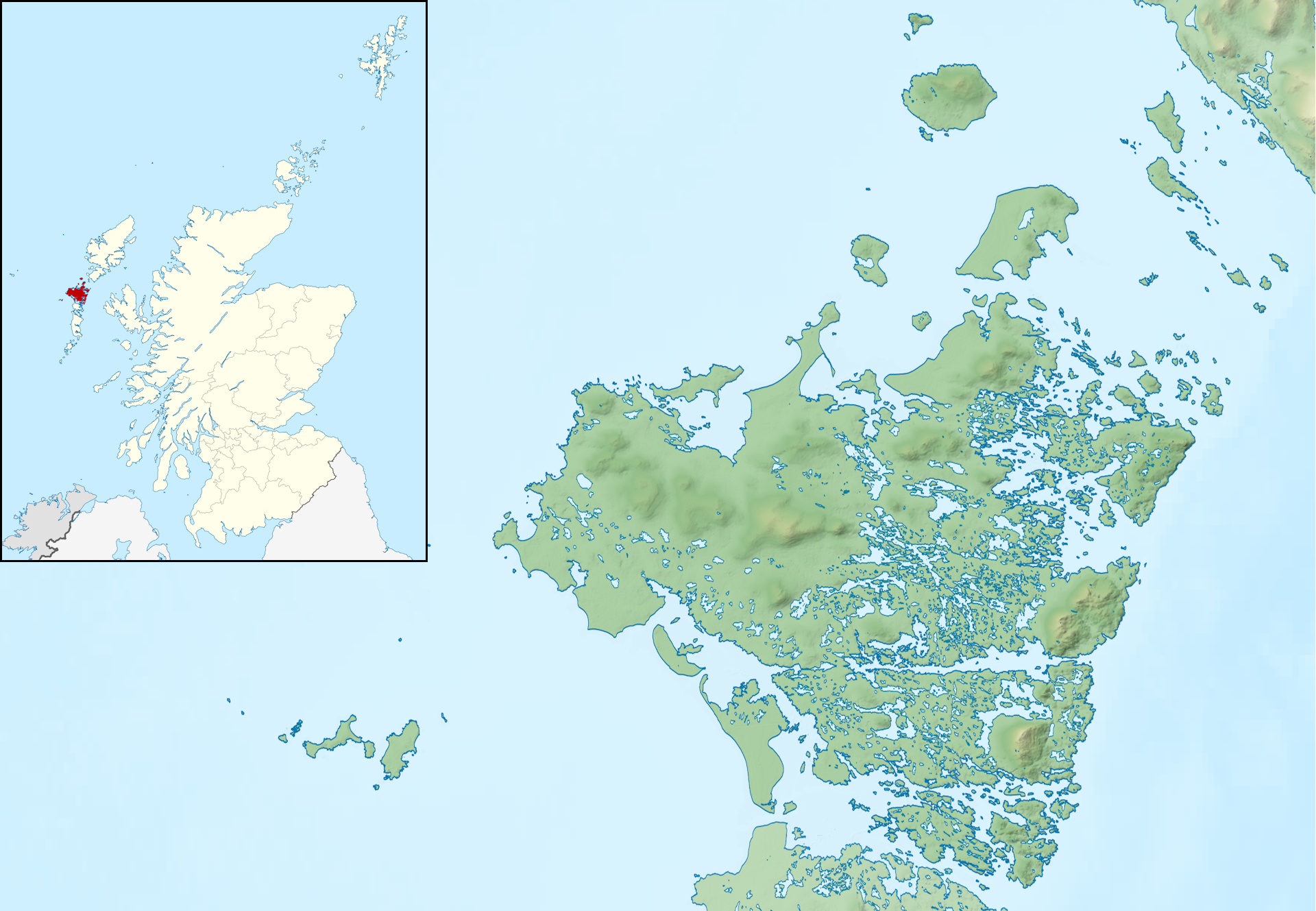
- Ceallasaigh Beag shown next to North Uist Ceallasaigh Beag shown within the Outer Hebrides
- OS grid reference: NF918713
- Coordinates: 57.63°N 7.16°W

Physical geography
- Island group: Uists and Barra
- Area: 46 ha (110 acres)
- Area rank: 189=
- Highest elevation: c. 10 m

Administration
- Council area: Na h-Eileanan Siar
- Country: Scotland
- Sovereign state: United Kingdom

Demographics
- Population: 0

Ceallasaigh Beag (or Keallasay Beg) is a low-lying island in Loch Maddy off North Uist in the Outer Hebrides of Scotland. This an area of shallow lagoons filled and drained by the tides each day. Ceallasaigh Mòr lies to the south and these two islets are connected by a narrow strip of sand during some low tides.

The area is c. 46 hectares (110 acres) as measured from Ordnance Survey maps at high tide. Rick Livingstone's Tables of the Islands of Scotland give an area of 55 hectares (140 acres), which may include land connected at low tide such as the outlying islet of Corr Eilean Keallasay.

Neither Ceallasaigh Mòr nor Ceallasaigh Beag are listed by Hamish Haswell-Smith in his definitive listings of islands greater in size than 40 hectares (99 acres) suggesting that he measured both of them as <40 ha, or that he considered them to be tidal and connected to mainland North Uist. It is possible that at some stages of the tide that these two islands are connected to one another and that Ceallasaigh Mòr is joined to North Uist near Bràigh Cheallasaigh.

== See also ==
Other complex islands in the vicinity:

- Eileanan Iasgaich
- Eileanan Chearabhaigh
