= Cealasaigh =

Cealasaigh (Gaelic)

Location
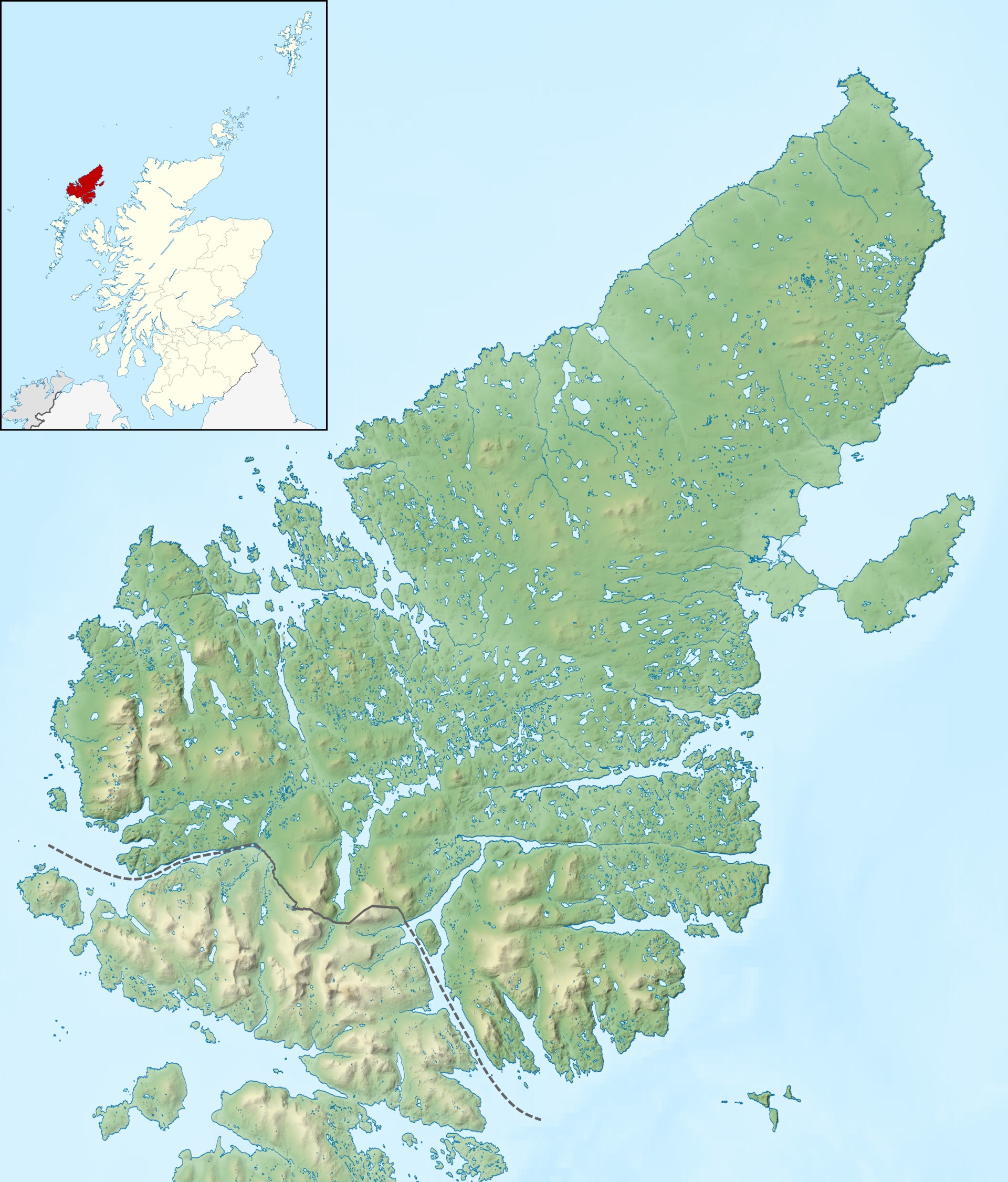
- Cealasaigh shown next to Lewis Cealasaigh within the Outer Hebrides
- OS grid reference: NB146418
- Coordinates: 58.3°N 6.87°W

Name
- Old Norse name: Unknown

Physical geography
- Island group: Outer Hebrides
- Area: <10 ha
- Highest elevation: 25 metres (82 ft)

Administration
- Council area: Comhairle nan Eilean Siar
- Country: Scotland
- Sovereign state: United Kingdom

Cealasaigh or Kealasay is an islet in outer Loch Ròg, Lewis, Scotland that lies north of Traigh Mhór on Little Bernera and south of Campaigh.

To the west is the islet of Eilean Fir Chrothair (isle of the shepherd) and Sgeir na h-Aon Chaorach (lone sheep rock) lies to the east.
