= Ceallasaigh Mòr =

Island in the Outer Hebrides, Scotland

Ceallasaigh Mòr (Gaelic)
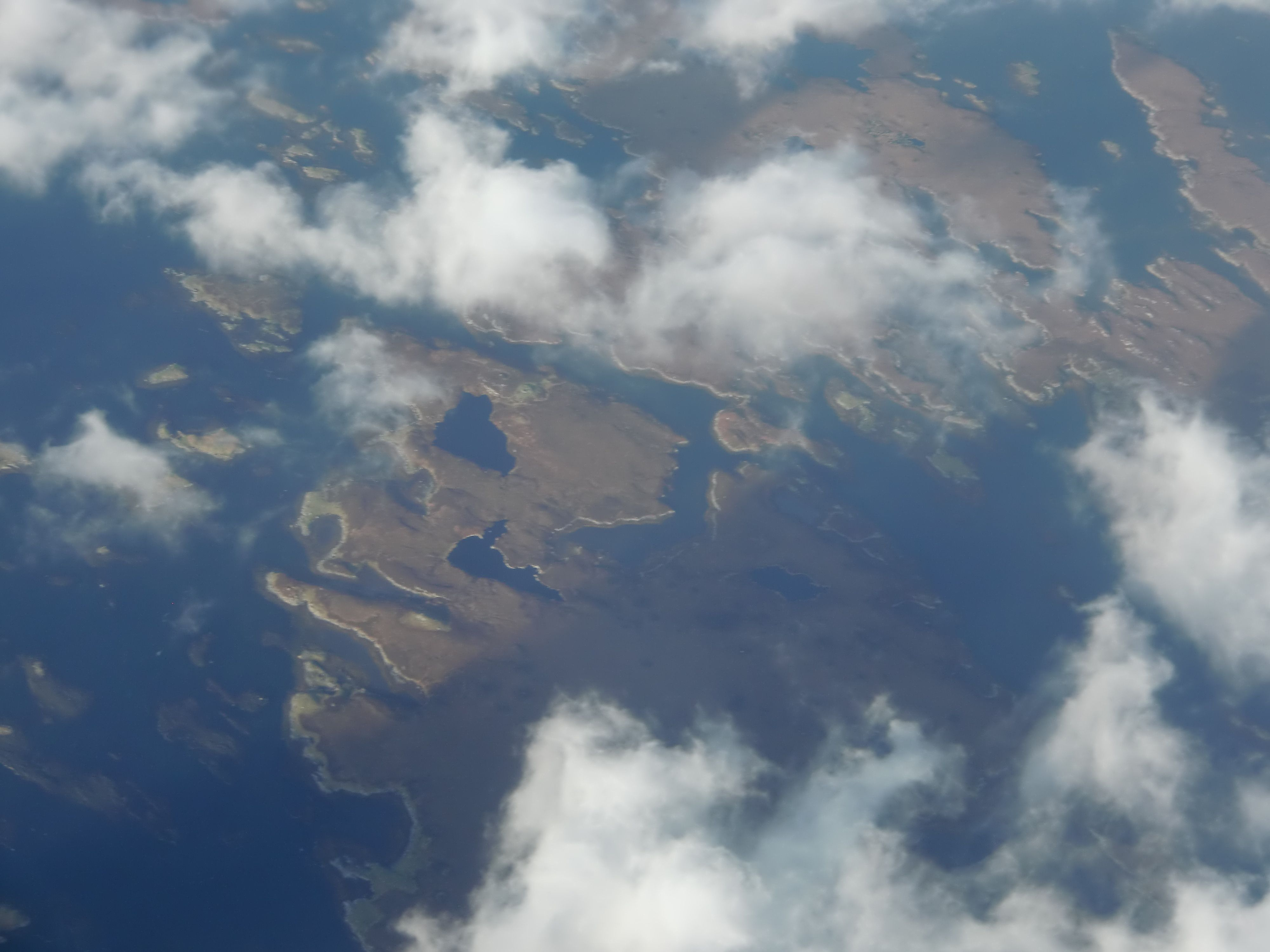
- Ceallasaigh Mòr from the air, Ceallasaigh Mòr is at the top of the picture, partly obscured by clouds, the Aisgernis peninsula of mainland North Uist is at top right

Location
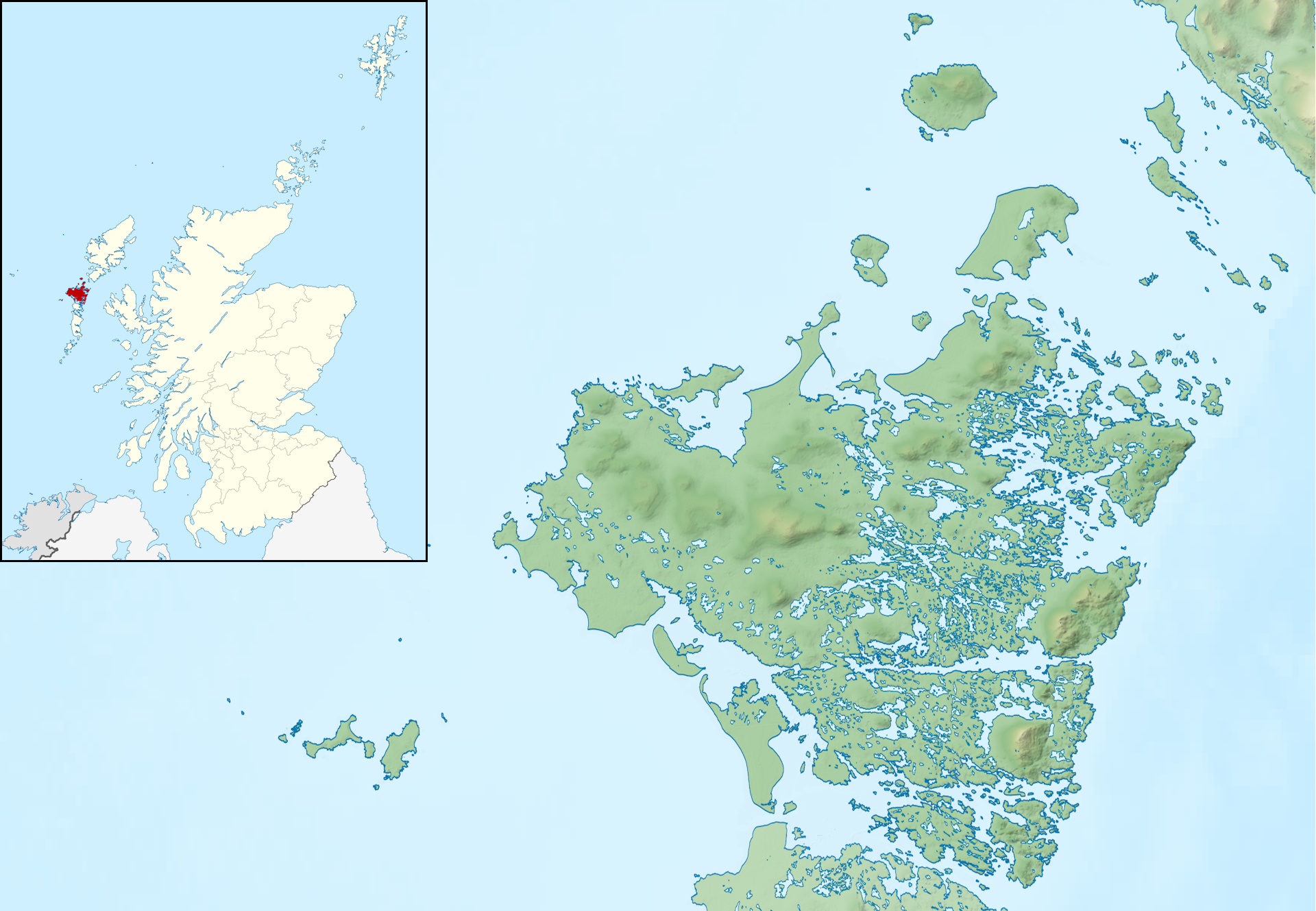
- Ceallasaigh Mòr shown next to North Uist Ceallasaigh Mòr shown within the Outer Hebrides
- OS grid reference: NF910723
- Coordinates: 57.64°N 7.18°W

Physical geography
- Island group: Uists and Barra
- Area: 55 ha
- Area rank: 189=
- Highest elevation: 10 m

Administration
- Council area: Na h-Eileanan Siar
- Country: Scotland
- Sovereign state: United Kingdom

Demographics
- Population: 0

Ceallasaigh Mòr (or Keallasay More) is a low-lying island in Loch Maddy off North Uist in the Outer Hebrides of Scotland. This an area of shallow lagoons filled and drained by the tides each day. Ceallasaigh Beag lies to the south and these two islets are connected by a narrow strip of sand at low tide. Ceallasaigh Mòr may also join mainland North Uist near Bràigh Cheallasaigh at some stages of the tide.
