= Kelly, Cornwall =

Hamlet in Egloshayle, Cornwall, England

Coordinates: 50°31′52″N 4°48′09″W

Kelly is a hamlet in the parish of Egloshayle, Cornwall, England.

Nearby is Kelly Rounds, or Castle Killibury, an Iron Age hill fort situated beside the A39 trunk road approximately two miles east of Wadebridge.
