= Langton, North Yorkshire =

Village and civil parish in North Yorkshire, England

Coordinates: 54°05′38″N 0°46′56″W

Langton
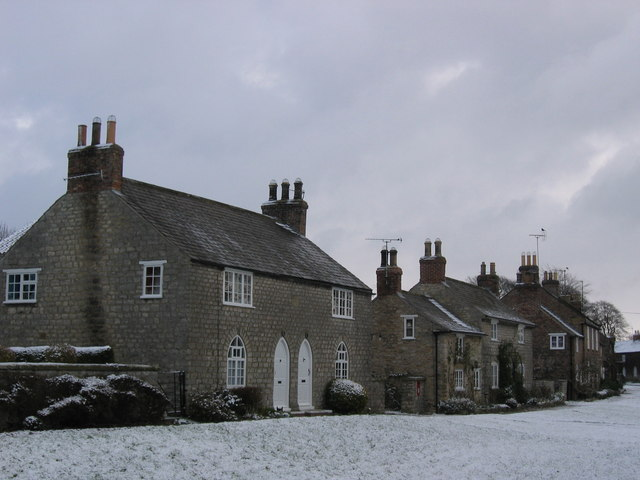
- Cottages in Langton

- Location within North Yorkshire
- OS grid reference: SE797671
  - London: 180 mi (290 km) S
- Civil parish: Langton
- Unitary authority: North Yorkshire
- Ceremonial county: North Yorkshire
- Region: Yorkshire and the Humber
- Country: England
- Sovereign state: United Kingdom
- Post town: MALTON
- Postcode district: YO17
- Police: North Yorkshire
- Fire: North Yorkshire
- Ambulance: Yorkshire
- UK Parliament: Thirsk and Malton

Langton is a village and civil parish in North Yorkshire, England. It is situated 3.5 miles (6 km) south from the market town of Malton. The population at the 2011 Census was less than 100. Details are included in the civil parish of Birdsall, North Yorkshire. At the end of the village lies Langton Hall, which offers holiday lettings and is now home to Charles William Langton, a businessman from Leeds, West Yorkshire.

Langton Hall has recently been used for TV filming including Gentleman Jack (Series 2 episode 1) and also featured in Rich House Poor House, (Series 10, episode 2).

Until 1974 the village lay in the historic county boundaries of the East Riding of Yorkshire. Between 1974 and 2023 it was part of the Ryedale district. It is now administered by North Yorkshire Council.

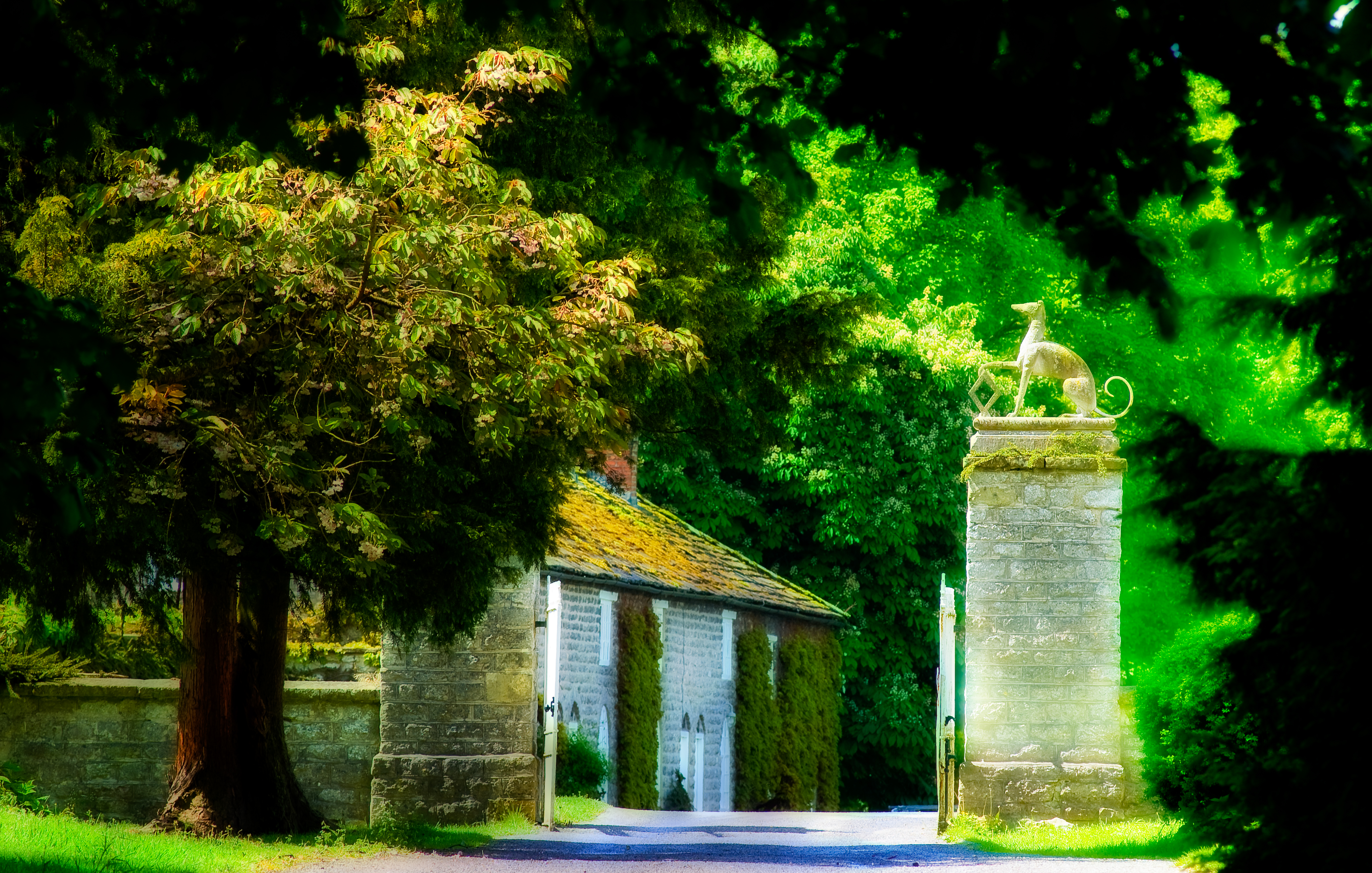
The gates of Langton Hall

Langton Hall was the home of Woodleigh School, an independent preparatory school founded in 1929 by the educationalist Arthur England, from 1946 until the school's closure in 2012. There is also a small state primary school, Langton Community School with around 80 pupils.

The village was historically the seat of the Norcliffe family. Their former home, Langton Hall, previously owned by their descendants, the Howard-Vyse family, and leased to Woodleigh School until 2012, is a Grade II listed building.

Langton Hall was purchased by William Langton in 2019 (namesake coincidence), who has undertaken a full restoration of the "decaying country pile after falling for its charms".

In 1823 Langton was a civil parish in the East Riding of Yorkshire, and the Wapentake of Buckrose. St Andrew's Church, Langton and the parish living was under the patronage of the King. Population at the time was 280. Occupations included five farmers, two grocers, a tailor & draper, a butcher, a shoemaker, a schoolmaster, a parish constable, and the landlord of Horse Shoes public house who was also a blacksmith. A Major and Mrs Northcliffe were resident at the Hall.

== See also ==
- Listed buildings in Langton, North Yorkshire
