= Old Hall =

Old Hall may refer to:

- Old Hall, Asfordby, Leicestershire, England
- Old Hall Mill, Belaugh Norfolk, England
- Old Hall, Bellerby, North Yorkshire, England
- The Old Hall, Beverley, North Yorkshire, England
- Old Hall Hotel, Buxton, Derbyshire
- The Old Hall, Carlton Husthwaite, North Yorkshire, England
- The Old Hall, Coxwold, North Yorkshire, England
- Old Hall, Hedon, East Riding of Yorkshire, England
- Old Hall, Hornsea, East Riding of Yorkshire, England
- Old Hall, Hurworth-on-Tees, County Durham, England
- Old Hall, Powys, a location in Wales
- The Old Hall, Ripon, North Yorkshire, England
- Old Hall, Wolverhampton, West Midlands, England

== See also ==
- Old City Hall (disambiguation)
- Old Town Hall (disambiguation)
- Old Hall Manuscript
