= Eaton upon Tern =

Village in Shropshire, England

Coordinates: 52.8027°N 2.5131°W

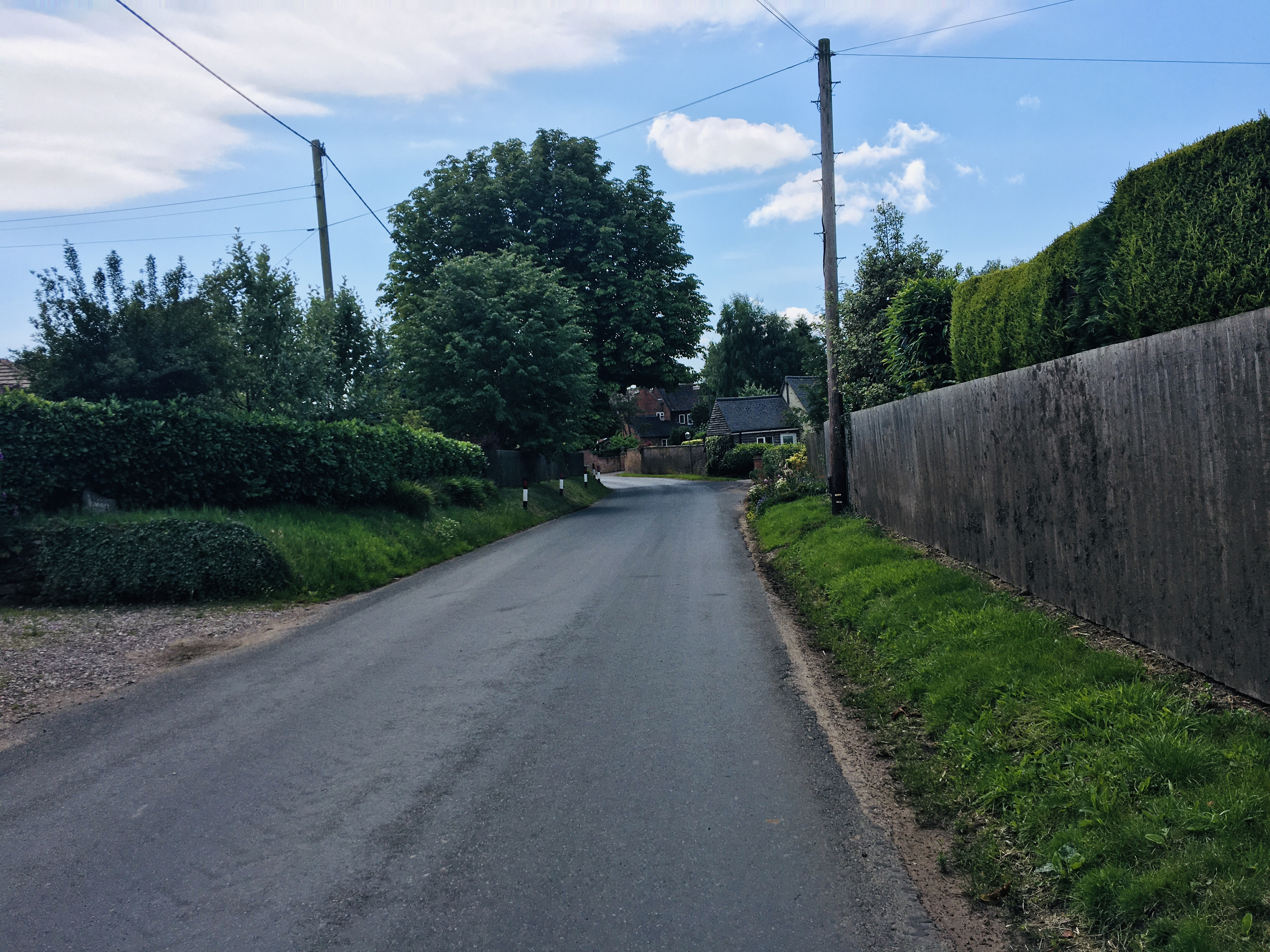

- Location within Shropshire
- OS grid reference: SJ653232
- Civil parish: Stoke upon Tern
- Unitary authority: Shropshire
- Ceremonial county: Shropshire
- Region: West Midlands
- Country: England
- Sovereign state: United Kingdom
- Post town: MARKET DRAYTON
- Postcode district: TF9
- Dialling code: 01952
- Police: West Mercia
- Fire: Shropshire
- Ambulance: West Midlands
- UK Parliament: North Shropshire

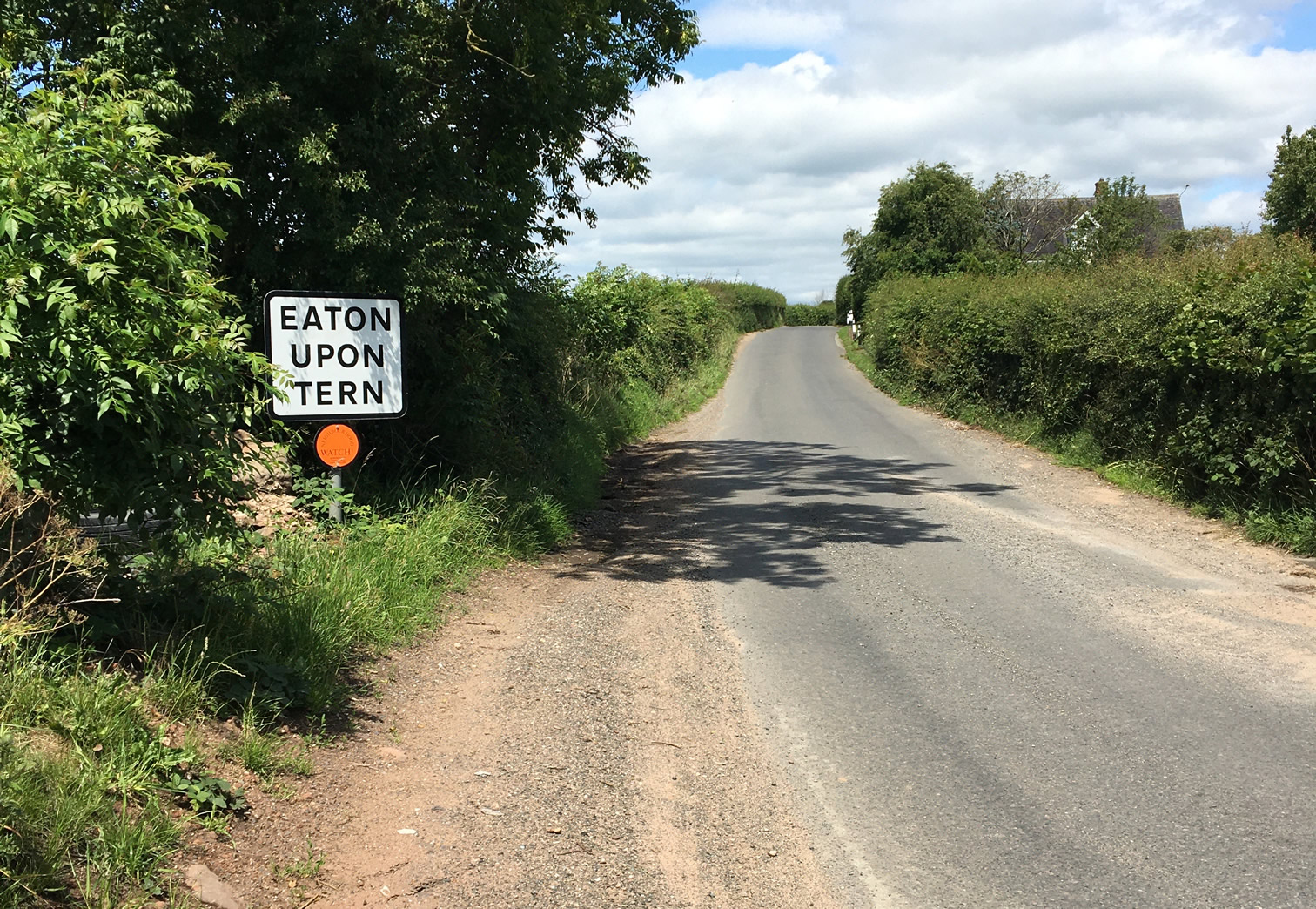
An Eaton upon Tern road sign

Eaton upon Tern is a small village, located in the parish of Stoke upon Tern in Northern Shropshire, England. The parish also includes the settlements of Ollerton, Stoke Heath, Wistanswick and the village of Stoke on Tern itself.

It is located in a rural area near the border of the borough of Telford and Wrekin. It is about midway between the towns of Telford and Market Drayton.

The village's name comes from the River Tern which runs through the village.

The village formerly had a bus stop, where buses between Market Drayton and Telford used to stop, which has since been permanently closed.

== See also ==
- Listed buildings in Stoke upon Tern
