= List of United Kingdom locations: Old H-Om =

The United Kingdom

This is part of the list of United Kingdom locations: a gazetteer of place names in the United Kingdom showing each place's locality and geographical coordinates.

== Ol (continued) ==
=== Old H – Old Z ===
Location	Locality	Coordinates (links to map & photo sources)	OS grid reference
Old Hall	Powys	52.44°N 03.61°W	SN9084
Oldhall	Renfrewshire	55.84°N 04.39°W	NS5064
Oldhall Green	Suffolk	52.17°N 00.76°E	TL8956
Old Hall Green	Hertfordshire	51.88°N 00.01°W	TL3722
Old Hall Street	Norfolk	52.84°N 01.41°E	TG3033
Oldham	Oldham	53.53°N 02.12°W	SD9204
Oldham Edge	Oldham	53.54°N 02.12°W	SD9205
Oldhamstocks	East Lothian	55.92°N 02.41°W	NT7470
Old Harlow	Essex	51.77°N 00.12°E	TL4711
Old Hatfield	Hertfordshire	51.75°N 00.21°W	TL2308
Old Heath	Essex	51.86°N 00.91°E	TM0123
Old Heathfield	East Sussex	50.95°N 00.26°E	TQ5920
Old Hill	Sandwell	52.47°N 02.07°W	SO9586
Old Hill	Western Isles	58.27°N 06.91°W	NB120424
Old Hills	Worcestershire	52.13°N 02.24°W	SO8348
Old Hunstanton	Norfolk	52.94°N 00.49°E	TF6842
Old Hurst	Cambridgeshire	52.37°N 00.09°W	TL3077
Old Hutton	Cumbria	54.28°N 02.67°W	SD5688
Oldington	Shropshire	52.57°N 02.39°W	SO7397
Old Johnstone	Dumfries and Galloway	55.27°N 03.19°W	NY2499
Old Kea	Cornwall	50.22°N 05.03°W	SW8441
Old Kilpatrick	West Dunbartonshire	55.92°N 04.46°W	NS4673
Old Kinnernie	Aberdeenshire	57.17°N 02.46°W	NJ7209
Old Knebworth	Hertfordshire	51.86°N 00.21°W	TL2320
Oldland	South Gloucestershire	51.43°N 02.49°W	ST6671
Oldland Common	South Gloucestershire	51.43°N 02.47°W	ST6771
Old Langho	Lancashire	53.81°N 02.45°W	SD7035
Old Law	Northumberland	55.65°N 01.79°W	NU131400
Old Laxey	Isle of Man	54.21°N 04.39°W	SC4483
Old Leake	Lincolnshire	53.02°N 00.08°E	TF4050
Old Lindley	Calderdale	53.66°N 01.86°W	SE0919
Old Linslade	Bedfordshire	51.92°N 00.67°W	SP9126
Old Llanberis	Gwynedd	53.10°N 04.09°W	SH6058
Old Malden	Kingston upon Thames	51.38°N 00.26°W	TQ2166
Old Malton	North Yorkshire	54.13°N 00.79°W	SE7972
Old Man of Hoy	Orkney Islands	58.89°N 03.42°W	HY181011
Old Marton	Shropshire	52.89°N 02.98°W	SJ3434
Old Mead	Essex	51.92°N 00.22°E	TL5327
Oldmeldrum	Aberdeenshire	57.33°N 02.33°W	NJ8027
Old Micklefield	Leeds	53.79°N 01.33°W	SE4433
Old Mill	Cornwall	50.53°N 04.31°W	SX3673
Old Milton	Hampshire	50.74°N 01.67°W	SZ2394
Old Milverton	Warwickshire	52.30°N 01.56°W	SP3067
Oldmixon	North Somerset	51.31°N 02.96°W	ST3358
Old Monkland	North Lanarkshire	55.84°N 04.04°W	NS7263
Old Montrose	Angus	56.70°N 02.54°W	NO6757
Old Nenthorn	Scottish Borders	55.61°N 02.52°W	NT6736
Old Netley	Hampshire	50.88°N 01.33°W	SU4710
Old Neuadd	Powys	52.46°N 03.35°W	SO0886
Old Newton	Suffolk	52.21°N 00.99°E	TM0562
Old Oak Common	Ealing	51.52°N 00.25°W	TQ2182
Old Park	Cornwall	50.45°N 04.48°W	SX2465
Old Park	Shropshire	52.67°N 02.47°W	SJ6809
Old Passage	South Gloucestershire	51.58°N 02.63°W	ST5688
Old Perton	Staffordshire	52.57°N 02.22°W	SO8598
Old Philpstoun	West Lothian	55.97°N 03.52°W	NT0577
Old Portsmouth	City of Portsmouth	50.78°N 01.10°W	SZ6399
Old Quarrington	Durham	54.72°N 01.50°W	NZ3237
Old Radnor	Powys	52.22°N 03.09°W	SO2559
Old Rayne	Aberdeenshire	57.34°N 02.54°W	NJ6728
Old Romney	Kent	50.98°N 00.89°E	TR0325
Old Scone	Perth and Kinross	56.41°N 03.44°W	NO1126
Old Shirley	City of Southampton	50.92°N 01.44°W	SU3914
Oldshore Beg	Highland	58.48°N 05.10°W	NC1959
Old Shoreham	West Sussex	50.84°N 00.29°W	TQ2006
Oldshoremore	Highland	58.47°N 05.08°W	NC2058
Old Snydale	Wakefield	53.68°N 01.39°W	SE4021
Old Sodbury	South Gloucestershire	51.52°N 02.36°W	ST7581
Old Somerby	Lincolnshire	52.88°N 00.57°W	SK9633
Oldstead	North Yorkshire	54.21°N 01.18°W	SE5380
Old Stillington	Durham	54.59°N 01.44°W	NZ3622
Old Storridge Common	Worcestershire	52.15°N 02.38°W	SO7451
Old Stratford	Northamptonshire	52.06°N 00.87°W	SP7741
Old Struan	Perth and Kinross	56.76°N 03.96°W	NN8065
Old Swan	Liverpool	53.41°N 02.91°W	SJ3991
Old Swarland	Northumberland	55.30°N 01.74°W	NU1601
Old Swinford	Dudley	52.44°N 02.14°W	SO9083
Old Tame	Oldham	53.57°N 02.06°W	SD9609
Old Tebay	Cumbria	54.43°N 02.60°W	NY6105
Old Thirsk	North Yorkshire	54.23°N 01.34°W	SE4382
Old Tinnis	Scottish Borders	55.55°N 02.98°W	NT3829
Old Toll	South Ayrshire	55.44°N 04.59°W	NS3620
Oldtown	Highland	57.86°N 04.37°W	NH5989
Old Town	Calderdale	53.74°N 02.01°W	SD9928
Old Town (High Hesket)	Cumbria	54.77°N 02.82°W	NY4743
Old Town (Mansergh	Cumbria	54.24°N 02.63°W	SD5983
Old Town	East Riding of Yorkshire	54.08°N 00.19°W	TA1867
Old Town (Eastbourne)	East Sussex	50.76°N 00.25°E	TV5999
Old Town (Bexhill)	East Sussex	50.84°N 00.47°E	TQ7408
Old Town (Hastings)	East Sussex	50.85°N 00.58°E	TQ8209
Old Town	City of Edinburgh	55.94°N 03.20°W	NT2573
Old Town	Hertfordshire	51.91°N 00.21°W	TL2325
Old Town	Isles of Scilly	49.91°N 06.30°W	SV9110
Old Town	Swindon	51.54°N 01.78°W	SU1583
Old Trafford	Trafford	53.45°N 02.27°W	SJ8295
Old Tree	Kent	51.33°N 01.15°E	TR2064
Old Tupton	Derbyshire	53.18°N 01.43°W	SK3865
Oldwalls	Swansea	51.59°N 04.19°W	SS4891
Old Warden	Bedfordshire	52.07°N 00.35°W	TL1343
Old Warren	Flintshire	53.16°N 03.01°W	SJ3263
Old Way	Somerset	50.94°N 02.91°W	ST3617
Oldway	Devon	50.43°N 03.57°W	SX8861
Oldway	Swansea	51.57°N 04.05°W	SS5888
Oldways End	Devon	51.00°N 03.62°W	SS8624
Old Westhall	Aberdeenshire	57.31°N 02.54°W	NJ6725
Old Weston	Cambridgeshire	52.38°N 00.39°W	TL0977
Old Wharf	Herefordshire	52.02°N 02.43°W	SO7036
Oldwhat	Aberdeenshire	57.54°N 02.23°W	NJ8651
Old Whittington	Derbyshire	53.26°N 01.43°W	SK3874
Oldwich Lane	Solihull	52.36°N 01.69°W	SP2174
Old Wimpole	Cambridgeshire	52.14°N 00.04°W	TL3451
Old Windsor	Berkshire	51.45°N 00.59°W	SU9874
Old Wingate	Durham	54.72°N 01.42°W	NZ3737
Old Wives Lees	Kent	51.24°N 00.96°E	TR0754
Old Woking	Surrey	51.30°N 00.55°W	TQ0157
Old Wolverton	Milton Keynes	52.06°N 00.81°W	SP8141
Oldwood	Worcestershire	52.29°N 02.60°W	SO5966
Old Woodhall	Lincolnshire	53.18°N 00.19°W	TF2167
Old Woodhouses	Shropshire	52.97°N 02.62°W	SJ5842
Old Woodstock	Oxfordshire	51.85°N 01.36°W	SP4417
Old Woolwich	Greenwich	51.494°N 00.062°E	TQ432793

=== Oli – Olz ===
Location	Locality	Coordinates (links to map & photo sources)	OS grid reference
Olive Green	Staffordshire	52.75°N 01.83°W	SK1118
Oliver's Battery	Hampshire	51.04°N 01.35°W	SU4527
Ollaberry	Shetland Islands	60.50°N 01.34°W	HU3680
Ollag	Western Isles	57.38°N 07.36°W	NF7845
Ollerbrook Booth	Derbyshire	53.36°N 01.82°W	SK1285
Ollerton	Cheshire	53.28°N 02.34°W	SJ7776
Ollerton	Nottinghamshire	53.19°N 01.02°W	SK6567
Ollerton	Shropshire	52.82°N 02.53°W	SJ6425
Ollerton Fold	Lancashire	53.70°N 02.59°W	SD6123
Ollerton Lane	Shropshire	52.82°N 02.52°W	SJ6525
Olmstead Green	Cambridgeshire	52.04°N 00.37°E	TL6341
Olney	Milton Keynes	52.15°N 00.71°W	SP8851
Olton	Solihull	52.43°N 01.81°W	SP1382
Olveston	South Gloucestershire	51.58°N 02.57°W	ST6087

== Om ==
Location	Locality	Coordinates (links to map & photo sources)	OS grid reference
Ombersley	Worcestershire	52.26°N 02.23°W	SO8463
Ompton	Nottinghamshire	53.17°N 00.98°W	SK6865
Omunsgarth	Shetland Islands	60.21°N 01.37°W	HU3548
