= Oldwood =

Oldwood may mean:

- Oldwood, Shropshire - a hamlet in Shropshire, England
- Oldwood, Worcestershire - a hamlet in Worcestershire, England
- Leucosidea sericea - a species of evergreen tree and large shrub native to the Afromontane regions of Southern Africa.
