= List of United Kingdom locations: Eat-Ee =

The United Kingdom

This is part of the list of United Kingdom locations: a gazetteer of place names in the United Kingdom showing each place's locality and geographical coordinates.

== Ea (continued) ==
=== Eat-Eaz ===
Location	Locality	Coordinates (links to map & photo sources)	OS grid reference
Eathorpe	Warwickshire	52.31°N 01.42°W	SP3969
Eaton (Heywood)	Shropshire	52.50°N 02.73°W	SO5090
Eaton (Bishop's Castle)	Shropshire	52.49°N 02.92°W	SO3789
Eaton	Herefordshire	52.21°N 02.73°W	SO5058
Eaton	Oxfordshire	51.72°N 01.36°W	SP4403
Eaton	Nottinghamshire	53.29°N 00.93°W	SK7178
Eaton (Rushton, Cheshire West)	Cheshire	53.16°N 02.64°W	SJ5763
Eaton (Cheshire East)	Cheshire	53.18°N 02.21°W	SJ8665
Eaton	Leicestershire	52.85°N 00.82°W	SK7929
Eaton	Norfolk	52.60°N 01.26°E	TG2106
Eaton Bishop	Herefordshire	52.03°N 02.81°W	SO4438
Eaton Bray	Bedfordshire	51.87°N 00.59°W	SP9720
Eaton Constantine	Shropshire	52.65°N 02.60°W	SJ5906
Eaton Ford	Cambridgeshire	52.22°N 00.28°W	TL1760
Eaton Hall	Cheshire	53.13°N 02.88°W	SJ4160
Eaton Hastings	Oxfordshire	51.67°N 01.63°W	SU2597
Eaton Mascott	Shropshire	52.64°N 02.69°W	SJ5305
Eaton Socon	Cambridgeshire	52.21°N 00.30°W	TL1659
Eaton upon Tern	Shropshire	52.80°N 02.52°W	SJ6523
Eau Brink	Norfolk	52.71°N 00.33°E	TF5816
Eau Withington	Herefordshire	52.07°N 02.67°W	SO5442
Eaves	Lancashire	53.83°N 02.75°W	SD507373
Eaves Green	Solihull	52.43°N 01.63°W	SP2582
Eavestone	North Yorkshire	54.10°N 01.66°W	SE2268

== Eb ==
Location	Locality	Coordinates (links to map & photo sources)	OS grid reference
Ebberly Hill	Devon	50.95°N 04.03°W	SS5719
Ebberston	North Yorkshire	54.22°N 00.63°W	SE8982
Ebbesbourne Wake	Wiltshire	51.01°N 02.01°W	ST9924
Ebblake	Dorset	50.86°N 01.85°W	SU1007
Ebbw Vale	Blaenau Gwent	51.77°N 03.21°W	SO1609
Ebchester	Durham	54.89°N 01.84°W	NZ1055
Ebdon	North Somerset	51.37°N 02.92°W	ST3664
Ebernoe	West Sussex	51.03°N 00.61°W	SU9727
Ebford	Devon	50.67°N 03.44°W	SX9887
Ebley	Gloucestershire	51.73°N 02.26°W	SO8204
Ebnal	Cheshire	53.02°N 02.76°W	SJ4948
Ebnall	Herefordshire	52.21°N 02.77°W	SO4758
Ebreywood	Shropshire	52.74°N 02.68°W	SJ5417
Ebrington	Gloucestershire	52.05°N 01.73°W	SP1840

== Ec ==
Location	Locality	Coordinates (links to map & photo sources)	OS grid reference
Ecchinswell	Hampshire	51.32°N 01.28°W	SU5059
Ecclefechan	Dumfries and Galloway	55.05°N 03.26°W	NY1974
Eccle Riggs	Cumbria	54.26°N 03.21°W	SD2186
Eccles	Kent	51.31°N 00.48°E	TQ7360
Eccles	Scottish Borders	55.66°N 02.38°W	NT7641
Eccles	Salford	53.47°N 02.34°W	SJ7798
Ecclesall	Sheffield	53.35°N 01.52°W	SK3284
Ecclesfield	Sheffield	53.44°N 01.47°W	SK3594
Eccleshall	Staffordshire	52.85°N 02.25°W	SJ8329
Eccleshill	Bradford	53.82°N 01.74°W	SE1736
Ecclesmachan	West Lothian	55.94°N 03.52°W	NT0573
Eccles on Sea	Norfolk	52.80°N 01.55°E	TG4029
Eccles Road	Norfolk	52.47°N 00.95°E	TM0190
Eccleston	St Helens	53.44°N 02.78°W	SJ4895
Eccleston	Lancashire	53.64°N 02.74°W	SD5117
Eccleston	Cheshire	53.15°N 02.89°W	SJ4062
Eccleston Park	Knowsley	53.43°N 02.79°W	SJ4793
Eccliffe	Dorset	51.02°N 02.30°W	ST7925
Eccup	Leeds	53.87°N 01.57°W	SE2842
Echt	Aberdeenshire	57.13°N 02.44°W	NJ7305
Eckford	Scottish Borders	55.52°N 02.47°W	NT7026
Eckfordmoss	Scottish Borders	55.51°N 02.47°W	NT7025
Eckington	Worcestershire	52.06°N 02.11°W	SO9241
Eckington	Derbyshire	53.30°N 01.37°W	SK4279
Eckington Corner	East Sussex	50.86°N 00.14°E	TQ5109
Ecklands	Barnsley	53.51°N 01.68°W	SE2102
Eckworthy	Devon	50.93°N 04.27°W	SS4017
Ecton	Northamptonshire	52.25°N 00.79°W	SP8263
Ecton	Staffordshire	53.11°N 01.86°W	SK0958
Ecton Brook	Northamptonshire	52.25°N 00.81°W	SP8162

== Ed ==
Location	Locality	Coordinates (links to map & photo sources)	OS grid reference
Edale	Derbyshire	53.36°N 01.82°W	SK1285
Edale End	Derbyshire	53.37°N 01.76°W	SK1686
Eday	Orkney Islands	59.17°N 02.78°W	HY553318
Edbrook	Somerset	51.15°N 03.10°W	ST2340
Edburton	West Sussex	50.88°N 00.25°W	TQ2311
Edderside	Cumbria	54.79°N 03.40°W	NY1045
Edderton	Highland	57.82°N 04.17°W	NH7184
Eddington	Berkshire	51.41°N 01.51°W	SU3469
Eddington	Kent	51.36°N 01.13°E	TR1867
Eddleston	Scottish Borders	55.71°N 03.21°W	NT2447
Eddlewood	South Lanarkshire	55.75°N 04.05°W	NS7153
Eddystone Rocks	Devon	50.17°N 04.28°W	SX373329
Edenbridge	Kent	51.19°N 00.05°E	TQ4446
Edenfield	Lancashire	53.65°N 02.31°W	SD7918
Edenhall	Cumbria	54.68°N 02.68°W	NY5632
Edenham	Lincolnshire	52.77°N 00.42°W	TF0621
Eden Mount	Cumbria	54.19°N 02.92°W	SD4078
Eden Park	Bromley	51.39°N 00.04°W	TQ3668
Edensor	Derbyshire	53.21°N 01.62°W	SK2569
Edenthorpe	Doncaster	53.54°N 01.08°W	SE6106
Edentown	Cumbria	54.90°N 02.95°W	NY3957
Eden Vale	Cumbria	54.42°N 02.97°W	NY3704
Eden Vale	Durham	54.72°N 01.34°W	NZ4237
Edern	Gwynedd	52.92°N 04.57°W	SH2739
Edford	Somerset	51.23°N 02.47°W	ST6748
Edgarley	Somerset	51.13°N 02.70°W	ST5138
Edgbaston	Birmingham	52.45°N 01.92°W	SP0584
Edgcote	Northamptonshire	52.11°N 01.27°W	SP5047
Edgcott	Somerset	51.12°N 03.65°W	SS8438
Edgcott	Buckinghamshire	51.89°N 01.02°W	SP6722
Edgcumbe	Cornwall	50.15°N 05.19°W	SW7233
Edge	Gloucestershire	51.77°N 02.23°W	SO8409
Edge	Shropshire	52.66°N 02.90°W	SJ3908
Edgebolton	Shropshire	52.78°N 02.63°W	SJ5721
Edgebury	Bromley	51.426°N 00.066°E	TQ437717
Edge End	Gloucestershire	51.81°N 02.59°W	SO5913
Edge End	Lancashire	53.78°N 02.42°W	SD7232
Edgefield	Norfolk	52.86°N 01.10°E	TG0934
Edgefield Street	Norfolk	52.85°N 01.10°E	TG0933
Edge Fold	Bolton	53.55°N 02.45°W	SD7006
Edge Fold	Lancashire	53.65°N 02.42°W	SD7218
Edge Green	Norfolk	52.42°N 00.99°E	TM0485
Edge Green	Wigan	53.48°N 02.61°W	SJ5999
Edge Green	Cheshire	53.04°N 02.77°W	SJ4850
Edge Hill	Warwickshire	52.57°N 01.66°W	SP2398
Edgehill	Warwickshire	52.12°N 01.46°W	SP3747
Edge Hill	Liverpool	53.39°N 02.96°W	SJ3689
Edgeley	Stockport	53.39°N 02.18°W	SJ8889
Edge Mount	Sheffield	53.43°N 01.59°W	SK2793
Edgerley	Shropshire	52.75°N 02.97°W	SJ3418
Edgerston	Scottish Borders	55.39°N 02.50°W	NT6811
Edgerton	Kirklees	53.64°N 01.80°W	SE1317
Edgeside	Lancashire	53.69°N 02.25°W	SD8322
Edgeworth	Gloucestershire	51.75°N 02.08°W	SO9406
Edginswell	Devon	50.48°N 03.58°W	SX8866
Edgiock	Worcestershire	52.23°N 01.95°W	SP0360
Edgmond	Shropshire	52.76°N 02.41°W	SJ7219
Edgmond Marsh	Shropshire	52.77°N 02.43°W	SJ7120
Edgton	Shropshire	52.45°N 02.91°W	SO3885
Edgware	Barnet	51.61°N 00.28°W	TQ1992
Edgwick	Coventry	52.42°N 01.50°W	SP3481
Edgworth	Lancashire	53.64°N 02.39°W	SD7416
Edial	Staffordshire	52.67°N 01.89°W	SK0708
Edinample	Stirling	56.36°N 04.28°W	NN5922
Edinbane	Highland	57.47°N 06.43°W	NG3451
Edinburgh	City of Edinburgh	55.94°N 03.17°W	NT2773
Edingale	Staffordshire	52.70°N 01.69°W	SK2112
Edingley	Nottinghamshire	53.08°N 01.01°W	SK6655
Edingthorpe	Norfolk	52.83°N 01.44°E	TG3232
Edingthorpe Green	Norfolk	52.82°N 01.42°E	TG3131
Edington	Somerset	51.14°N 02.88°W	ST3839
Edington	Wiltshire	51.27°N 02.11°W	ST9253
Edingworth	Somerset	51.27°N 02.93°W	ST3553
Edistone	Devon	50.96°N 04.50°W	SS2421
Edithmead	Somerset	51.23°N 02.97°W	ST3249
Edith Weston	Rutland	52.63°N 00.62°W	SK9305
Edlaston	Derbyshire	52.97°N 01.74°W	SK1742
Edlesborough	Buckinghamshire	51.86°N 00.59°W	SP9719
Edlingham	Northumberland	55.36°N 01.82°W	NU1108
Edlington	Lincolnshire	53.22°N 00.15°W	TF2371
Edmondsham	Dorset	50.89°N 01.91°W	SU0611
Edmondsley	Durham	54.83°N 01.64°W	NZ2349
Edmondstown	Rhondda, Cynon, Taff	51.60°N 03.44°W	ST0090
Edmondthorpe	Leicestershire	52.74°N 00.74°W	SK8517
Edmonston	South Lanarkshire	55.66°N 03.48°W	NT0742
Edmonton	Cornwall	50.51°N 04.87°W	SW9672
Edmonton	Enfield	51.61°N 00.08°W	TQ3392
Edmundbyers	Durham	54.84°N 01.98°W	NZ0150
Ednam	Scottish Borders	55.62°N 02.43°W	NT7337
Ednaston	Derbyshire	52.96°N 01.65°W	SK2341
Edney Common	Essex	51.71°N 00.38°E	TL6504
Edradynate	Perth and Kinross	56.64°N 03.82°W	NN8852
Edrom	Scottish Borders	55.78°N 02.28°W	NT8255
Edstaston	Shropshire	52.87°N 02.72°W	SJ5131
Edstone	Warwickshire	52.24°N 01.75°W	SP1761
Edvin Loach	Herefordshire	52.21°N 02.49°W	SO6658
Edwalton	Nottinghamshire	52.90°N 01.12°W	SK5935
Edwardstone	Suffolk	52.04°N 00.82°E	TL9442
Edwardsville	Rhondda, Cynon, Taff	51.65°N 03.33°W	ST0896
Edwinstowe	Nottinghamshire	53.18°N 01.07°W	SK6266
Edworth	Bedfordshire	52.05°N 00.22°W	TL2241
Edwyn Ralph	Herefordshire	52.21°N 02.52°W	SO6457
Edzell	Angus	56.80°N 02.65°W	NO6068
