= Strangeways Prison riot =

25-day prison riot in Manchester, England

Prisoners protesting on the badly damaged roof of the prison. Paul Taylor is in the centre with his arms outstretched.

The 1990 Strangeways Prison riot was a 25-day prison riot and rooftop protest at Strangeways Prison in Manchester, England. The riot began on 1 April 1990 when prisoners took control of the prison chapel, and quickly spread throughout most of the prison. The incident ended on 25 April when the final five prisoners were removed from the rooftop. One prisoner was killed during the riot, and 147 prison officers and 47 prisoners were injured. Much of the prison was damaged or destroyed, with the cost of repairs coming to £55 million (equivalent to £136 million in 2025). It was the longest prison riot in British penal history.

The riot was followed by a series of disturbances in prisons across England, Scotland and Wales, resulting in the British government announcing a public inquiry into the riots headed by Lord Woolf. The resulting Woolf Report concluded that conditions in the prison had been intolerable, and recommended major reform of the UK prison system. The Guardian described the report as a blueprint for the restoration of "decency and justice into jails where conditions had become intolerable".

== Background ==
Strangeways Prison, which opened in Manchester in 1868, was a "local prison" designed to hold prisoners from the surrounding area, mainly those on remand or serving sentences of less than five years. At the time of the riot, the main prison consisted of six wings connected by a central rotunda known as the centre. Convicted adult prisoners were held in wings A, B, C and D, and convicted young offenders were held in E wing, which was physically separated from the centre by gates. Convicted prisoners on Rule 43(a) (Note: Rule 43(a) is for the segregation of prisoners who choose to be isolated for their own protection such as sex offenders, informants, or former police and prison officers, who are all at risk of being attacked by other prisoners.) were held on landings C1 and C2 of C wing, and remand prisoners on Rule 43(a) were held on the fourth landing on E wing. F wing contained administrative offices on the lower floor and the chapel on the upper floor. Remand prisoners were held in wings G, H, I and K of a separate prison, linked to the main prison through workshops and a kitchen. The Certified Normal Accommodation for Strangeways, the number of prisoners the prison was designed to hold, was 970. The population of the prison had increased in the months before the riot, from 1,417 in January 1990 to a peak of 1,658 on 27 March. On 1 April, the prison contained 1,647 prisoners – about 925 convicted adult prisoners, 500 remand prisoners and 210 convicted young offenders.

Prisoners felt their complaints about conditions were being ignored. Remand prisoners were allowed out of their cells for only eighteen hours per week, and Category A prisoners (Note: Category A prisoners are those whose escape would be highly dangerous to the public or national security.) were locked in their cells for twenty-two hours a day, and rarely left their cells except for "slopping out", a one-hour exercise period each day or a weekly shower. In March 1990, Dominic Noonan was transferred from Strangeways to HM Prison Hull. Noonan was the organiser of the Prisoners' League Association (PLA), an organisation formed in 1989 which campaigned for prisoners' rights. Its aims included initiating legal proceedings against prison staff for mistreatment of prisoners and picketing outside prisons in which prisoners were mistreated. The PLA were active at Strangeways, and Noonan's transfer demonstrated prison officers were aware of rising tensions inside the prison.

On 26 March 1990, Barry Morton was taken to the "punishment block" and strip-searched after being visited by his mother, as prison officers believed she had brought drugs into the prison for him. During a struggle he sustained a black eye and swollen nose, and the following day he was released back into the main prison along with another prisoner, Tony Bush. Later the same day, Morton and Bush climbed onto the roof of the prison and staged a twenty-hour rooftop protest. On 31 March there was a thirty-minute sit-down protest in the chapel after a film was shown; the protest ended after a prison officer promised to listen to the prisoners' grievances. The same evening it is reported that a black prisoner was assaulted by prison officers in front of other prisoners, and injected with Largactil – a sedative used to control prisoners, known in prisons as the "liquid cosh". Prisoners then decided to stage a further protest in the chapel the following day, 1 April.

== The riot ==
=== Disturbance in the chapel ===
Prison officers had advance warning that an incident would occur in the chapel on 1 April, and security was increased. Extra prison officers were used to escort prisoners to the service, and fourteen officers were inside the chapel supervising the service instead of the usual total of eight. An additional seven officers were also stationed in the vestry outside the chapel. The service was attended by 309 prisoners which was about the usual attendance, but all Rule 43(a) prisoners were prevented from attending as a precautionary measure. A senior prison officer believed the prisoners would attempt another sit-down protest with the possibility of hostage-taking, and instructed staff to evacuate the chapel if trouble began. At approximately 11:00 am, a visiting Anglican minister had just delivered the sermon and the prison chaplain, the Reverend Noel Proctor, stood to thank the minister when prisoner Paul Taylor took the microphone from him and addressed the congregation. Proctor was recording the service for distribution to a prayer group, and the subsequent events were recorded:

Noel Proctor: After that remarkable message, that has...

Paul Taylor: I would like to say, right, that this man has just talked about blessing of the heart and a hardened heart can be delivered. No, it cannot, not with resentment, anger and bitterness and hatred being instilled in people.

[General noise, over which]

A prisoner: Fuck your system, fuck your rules.

[Applause]

Noel Proctor: Right, lads, sit down.

[More noise]

Noel Proctor: Right, lads, down. Down. Come on, this is no way to carry on in God's house.

[More noise]

A prisoner: Fuck your system.

[More noise]

Noel Proctor: Right, lads, sit down. This is completely out of order. Sit down.

A prisoner: Why is it? It's been waiting to happen for ever. It will never change.

Noel Proctor: Come on. This is terrible.

[More noise, banging, shouting, cheering]

Noel Proctor: All of you who want to go back to your cells, go the back of the church, please.

A prisoner: What? You're a fucking hypocrite, you.

Noel Proctor: I'm trying to help you, to keep you.

A prisoner: Leave it, mate.

[More noise until microphone goes dead]

As Proctor was appealing for calm, a prisoner brandishing two sticks shouted out, "You've heard enough, let's do it, get the bastards". Other prisoners responded by donning masks and brandishing weapons, and three prison officers started to leave the chapel as earlier instructed. A set of keys was taken from a prison officer when a number of officers were attacked by prisoners wielding fire extinguishers, table legs and fire buckets. A number of prisoners attempted to leave the chapel via the vestry; at the same time, the seven prison officers there attempted to gain entry to the chapel. Once they managed to do so, the officers were attacked by prisoners, and a second set of keys was taken from one of them. Some prisoners helped to get Proctor and injured officers to a place of safety via the vestry, while others barricaded entrances to the chapel or attempted to gain access to the roof.

=== The riot spreads ===
Damage caused to B wing of the prison

The prison officers guarding the gates outside the chapel abandoned them, and ran towards the centre. The prison officer in charge of the Centre saw his colleagues running from the direction of the chapel, but due to the presence of scaffolding he was in a poor position to view the upper levels and mistakenly assumed he saw prisoners running from the chapel. He informed other officers on C1 and D1 of this and, upon hearing that prisoners were in possession of keys, told them and officers on A1 that they should evacuate the prison. Governor Morrison, who was responsible for the main prison, then ordered officers to evacuate the Centre at 11:13 am as he mistakenly believed prisoners had entered the centre. By this time prisoners had gained access to the roofs of E and F wings, and from there gained access to other wings by making holes in unprotected office ceilings.

The prisoners found A and B wings unsupervised as the prison officers had already evacuated, and began to free other prisoners who were still locked in their cells. The prison officer in charge of the first landing of C wing was ordered to evacuate, and with the help of three other officers evacuated the 73 Rule 43(a) prisoners being held there, being fearful for the safety of the prisoners who were regarded as sex offenders. Due to rioting prisoners entering the wing, the officers were unable to evacuate a further seven Rule 43(a) prisoners who were being held on the second landing.

Rioting prisoners also gained access to E wing, where the Rule 43(a) prisoners had been left locked in their cells after the prison officers evacuated. A number of these Rule 43(a) prisoners were attacked by rioting prisoners. One such prisoner was Derek White, who was being held on remand on charges of indecent assault and buggery. White later died in North Manchester General Hospital on 3 April after being admitted suffering from head wounds, a dislocated shoulder and chest pains.

At 11:43 am rioting prisoners were seen approaching the remand prison, which was still secure. The prison governor, Brendan O'Friel, arrived at the prison at 11:55 am and gave orders to defend the remand prison. He later recalled that:

By 12 o'clock when I came in it looked as if we'd lost control of the whole thing. My first decision was to send a Governor 5 back up to the remand prison to see if we could hold it, but it was too late. That decision, had it been taken half an hour earlier, would have meant we could have held the remand prison, meaning we could have kept another 400 locked up. Assuming the doors would have held, that sort of thing. But we had about 200 staff on duty, and we must have lost nine or ten casualties of one sort or another and then you lose staff getting the casualties out. We didn't have a lot of the staff come pouring in until about 1 o'clock. I tell you what really bugged us was there an element of April Fool about it. We rang staff up about it, who said "You must be joking, is this an April Fool?" That's what happened when they rang up my home, my son thought it was an April Fool.

Rioting prisoners gained access to the remand prison at 12:20 pm through the kitchens in G wing, and began freeing prisoners who were still locked in their cells using stolen keys or improvised tools such as iron bars and fire extinguishers. At this point the rioting prisoners were in control of all accommodation wings of the prison. A large number of prisoners were on the prison roof, and roof tiles and other missiles were thrown at prison officers on the ground. Rioting inside the prison continued with cells being damaged and fires being started, and at 3:40 pm the Public Relations Department of the Home Office issued a statement:

At 11 am a disturbance started in the chapel at Strangeways Prison when some 300 prisoners attacked staff. Those prisoners then gained access to the chapel roof and then broke into the living accommodation in the main prison. Other prisoners, including those on remand, joined in the disturbance and staff had to be withdrawn. The perimeter is secure.

Between 2 pm and 5 pm approximately 800 prisoners had surrendered, and arrangements were made for them to be transferred to other prisons. At 8 pm Governor O'Friel agreed that prison officers should enter E wing, and at 8:05 pm approximately ten Control & Restraint (C&R) units each consisting of twelve prison officers entered the wing. By 8:10 pm all four landings of E wing had been secured, and one C&R unit progressed to the Centre where they fought with rioting prisoners. This was reported to O'Friel, who instructed the officers not to move beyond E wing. Scaffolding poles and other missiles were thrown at the C&R teams from the roof area above the fourth landing in E wing, and when prisoners broke onto the wing the C&R teams withdrew at 0:22 am on 2 April, leaving prisoners in control of the wing. Up to 1,100 of the 1,647 prisoners were involved in the rioting, and by the end of the first day 700 had surrendered and been transferred to other prisons along with 400 prisoners who were not involved in the rioting. Between 200 and 350 prisoners occupied the rooftop of the main prison during the night.

=== Rooftop protest ===
At 7 am on 2 April, an estimated total of 142 prisoners were still in control of all the accommodation wings of the prison. Some prisoners on the roof gave clenched fist salutes to the crowd watching below. Some prisoners were wearing prison officers' hats and uniforms, while others were wearing masks improvised from towels and blankets. A banner was unveiled that read "No dead", in response to claims in the press that between eleven and twenty prisoners had been killed in the rioting. At 10:00am, C&R units entered the remand prison and regained control, with six prisoners surrendering peacefully.

A Home Office statement was released at 11:45 am stating that no bodies had been found in the remand prison, and twelve prison officers and thirty-seven prisoners had received treatment in hospital to date. Further prisoners surrendered the same day, and by 6:00 pm 114 prisoners remained in the prison. On 3 April newspapers published pictures of the prisoners' "No dead" banner, while still insisting that twenty prisoners had been killed. The prisoners responded with a banner that read "Media contact now". The Manchester Evening News newspaper was contacted from inside the prison by telephone, and prisoners outlined their demands:

- Improved visiting facilities, including the right to physical contact with visitors and a children's play area.
- Category A prisoners would be allowed to wear their own clothes and be able to receive food parcels.
- Longer exercise periods.
- An end to 23-hour-a-day lock-up.

At 11:10 am Michael Unger from the Evening News was allowed into the prison as an "independent observer". Unger met prisoners who described their grievances to him, which included mental and physical abuse, poor food and conditions, and misuse of drugs in controlling prisoners. While Unger was inside the prison twelve C&R units attempted to regain control of E wing, in what became known as the "battle for E wing". Prisoners built barricades and threw scaffolding poles at the C&R units, and after approximately thirty minutes the C&R units withdrew without regaining control of the wing. By the end of the third day prisoners still controlled the upper levels of the prison, but prison officers had regained control of the lower level. A Home Office statement was issued:

During the course of the evening prison staff have had access at ground level to all wings in the main prison. No bodies have been found. Earlier today prison staff gained access to the main prison building in order to remove barricades to allow the surrender of inmates who wished to do so. No inmates were injured during this process. Nine prison staff were taken to outside hospital for treatment. Two remain overnight for observation. Negotiations were carried out by prison staff ... 31 inmates surrendered. All of those who surrendered have been interviewed, medically examined and fed. They will be transferred to other accommodation as soon as practicable.

On 4 April, O'Friel spoke to the press for the first time, describing the riot as "an explosion of evil which was quite terrible to see". Also that day the Prison Officers' Association (POA) claimed that Rule 43(a) prisoners were being treated in North Manchester General Hospital for castration wounds, which was repeated by sections of the press despite being categorically denied by the hospital's public relations officer and consultant-in-charge. Twenty-nine prisoners surrendered during the day leaving twenty-six prisoners inside the prison, eleven of whom had been identified by the Prison Service. Also that day a prison officer died in hospital from pneumonia; he had not been injured during the riot and suffered from a long-standing medical condition.

Two more prisoners surrendered on 5 April, the same day as the Home Office announced a public inquiry into the riot headed by Lord Woolf. By this time plans to retake the entire prison by force had been scrapped due to the likelihood of fatalities among prisoners or prison officers. That evening authorities introduced new tactics designed to weaken the resolve of the prisoners and to prevent them from sleeping. Loud music was played, lights were shone at the roof, and prison officers banged on their riot shields and shouted at the prisoners, including calling them "beasts", a term commonly used among prisoners at that time to refer to sex offenders.

The rooftop protest was watched by a crowd of onlookers and supporters outside the prison. Various political groups also attended in support of the prisoners, including anarchist group Class War, the Revolutionary Communist Group, and the PLA. On 6 April Paul Taylor attempted to shout out the prisoners' demands to the crowd gathered below, but he was drowned out by police sirens. Taylor and other prisoners responded by unfurling a banner which read "We fight and stand firm on behalf of humanity". On 9 April, The Sun newspaper called for an end to the riot, saying, "Jail riot scum must be crushed". Former prisoner John McVicar called for the retaking of the prison by force at the earliest possible opportunity. By 10 April more prisoners had surrendered, leaving thirteen inside the prison. Three more prisoners surrendered the following day, one of whom, Barry Morton, had taken part in the rooftop protest on 26 March. On 16 April, another three prisoners surrendered when they became ill with food poisoning.

Local businesses were calling for an end to the riot due to the disruption caused, including the closure of roads around the prison. A leather-jacket retailer in the vicinity of the prison claimed to have lost £20,000 in revenue since the riot had begun. Greater Manchester Police asked for £2 million to cover the costs of policing the riot, which it described as the "most savage incident of its kind ever experienced within the British prison service". On 17 April the remaining seven prisoners began negotiations to attempt to bring the rooftop protest to an end. Negotiations took place inside the prison between two Home Office officials and prisoner Alan Lord, who was negotiating on behalf of the remaining prisoners. On 23 April, Lord was captured by a C&R unit while on his way to meet the negotiators. Mark Williams, one of the remaining prisoner, later described his reactions to the negotiations and Lord's capture:

The last five prisoners descend from the roof in a "cherry picker": Mark Williams, John Murray, Paul Taylor, Martin Brian and Glyn Williams.

David Bell, the Home Office negotiator, kept contradicting himself, as if in a bid to prolong the negotiations. He would agree to our terms, then he would try and tell us it was out of his hands, and go back on his word. If it was out of the Home Officer's hands, then whose hands was it in? I think the final stages were messed around by the Home Office so that our protest could help to divert the public's attention from the Poll Tax revolt that was going on throughout the country. As Alan Lord was snatched after being asked to negotiate on behalf of us all, this made us all more defiant about ending the protest.

Following the capture of Lord, the remaining prisoners agreed that 25 April would be the final day of the protest. Prison officers entered the prison early in the morning and gradually began to occupy the upper landings. At 10:20 am one of the remaining prisoners, a seventeen-year-old on remand for joyriding, was captured leaving five prisoners remaining on the roof. When prison officers reached the roof they put up a sign similar to the ones used by prisoners throughout the protest, which read "HMP in charge—no visits". At 6:20 pm the remaining five prisoners were removed from the roof in a "cherry picker" hydraulic platform, giving clenched fist salutes to the press and public as they descended. During the course of the twenty-five day riot, the longest in British penal history, 147 prison officers and 47 prisoners had been injured.

== Disturbances at other prisons ==
The Strangeways riot caused a number of protests at prisons across England, Scotland and Wales, described as either solidarity actions or copycat riots. Approximately 100 remand prisoners at HM Prison Hull staged a sit-down protest in the exercise yard on 1 April after hearing about the riot on the radio. Disturbances occurred the same day at HM Prison Gartree, HM Prison Kirkham and HM Prison Rochester, although the Gartree protest had started three days earlier over conditions in the prison. There were minor disturbances at HM Prison Lindholme, HM Prison Low Newton and HM Prison Bedford on 2 April, HM Prison Durham, HM Prison Winchester and HM Prison Wandsworth on 4 April, and HM Young Offenders Institute Glen Parva on 6 April.

The weekend of 7 April and 8 April saw protests across the prison system. At HM Prison Leeds there was a sit-down protest after the arrival of over 100 prisoners who had been transferred from Strangeways. At HM Prison Dartmoor, between 100 and 120 prisoners wrecked D wing of the prison, and twelve prisoners also protested on the roof of C wing unfurling a banner that read "Strangeways, we are with you". Thirty-two prisoners from Dartmoor were transferred to HM Prison Bristol, where there was another major protest following their arrival. Up to 400 prisoners took over three wings of the prison, and held control of them for two days. 130 prisoners at HM Prison Cardiff destroyed cells, a twenty-hour rooftop protest took place at HM Prison Stoke Heath, and disturbances occurred at HM Prison Brixton, HM Prison Pentonville, HM Prison Stafford and HM Prison Shepton Mallet. A second protest took place at HM Prison Hull, where 110 prisoners staged a sit-down protest in the exercise yard.

Prisoners smashed windows at HM Prison Verne on 9 April, and forty prisoners held a prison officer hostage for twenty-four hours after taking over a hall at HM Prison Shotts on 10 April. On 12 April, two teenage remand prisoners at HM Prison Swansea barricaded themselves into their cell for seventeen hours, and on 22 April between 80 and 100 remand prisoners staged an eighteen-hour rooftop protest at HM Prison Pucklechurch.

== Media reaction ==
On 2 April newspapers reported a weekend of "anti-authority violence", as in addition to the Strangeways riot the poll tax riots had occurred in London on 31 March. Reports of the violence at Strangeways included kangaroo courts, hangings, castrations and that between eleven and twenty prisoners had been killed. On 3 April the front page of the Daily Mirror read "Prison Mob 'Hang Cop'", and claimed a former policeman imprisoned at Strangeways for rape had been killed by prisoners. The newspaper was forced to publish a retraction admitting that "reliable police sources" had been mistaken, when it transpired that the man was actually alive and imprisoned in HM Prison Leeds. Following the end of the rooftop protest the newspapers condemned the prisoners, with The Daily Telegraph describing the riot as "a degrading public spectacle" and The Independent describing the rioters as "dangerous and unstable criminals enjoying an orgy of destruction". The Guardian urged the government to institute reforms, a view which was the prevalent one for a time, stating:

Initially, the riot appeared to increase public support for radical reform of the present degrading prison system. Some of that goodwill will have been eroded by the antics of the rioters in the last two weeks, and may be further eroded once details emerge during the forthcoming criminal prosecutions. But this must not deflect Home Office ministers from the road down which they had belatedly begun to travel. A change in prison conditions is crucial if good order is to be restored to the system.

In its last act before disbanding in 1991 and being replaced by the Press Complaints Commission, the Press Council produced a comprehensive report into the press coverage during the Strangeways riot. The report stated that "many of the more gruesome events reported in the press had not occurred – nobody had been systematically mutilated, there had been no castrations, no bodies had been chopped up and flushed in the sewers. Though there was inter-prisoner violence in the first hours of the riot, torture on the scale suggested by many of the early reports did not take place." It further found that press coverage "fell into the serious ethical error of presenting speculation and unconfirmed reports as fact".

== The Woolf Report ==
A five-month public inquiry was held into the disturbances at Strangeways and other prisons, beginning in Manchester on 11 June 1990 and ending in London on 31 October. In addition to the public inquiry, Lord Woolf and Her Majesty's Chief Inspector of Prisons, Stephen Tumim, also sent letters to every prisoner and prison officer in the country. 1,300 prisoners and 430 prison officers responded, with many excerpts from the letters being appended to the finished report. The Woolf Report was published on 25 February 1991, and blamed the loss of control of the prison on the prison officers abandoning the gates outside the chapel, which "effectively handed the prison to the prisoners".

Woolf described the conditions inside Strangeways in the months leading up to the riot as "intolerable", and viewed a "combination of errors" by staff and management at the prison and Prison Service as a central contributing factor to the riot. He also blamed the failure of successive governments to "provide the resources to the Prison Service which were needed to enable the Service to provide for an increased prison population in a humane manner". Woolf recommended major reform of the Prison Service, and made twelve key recommendations with 204 accompanying proposals. The key recommendations were:

1. Closer cooperation between the different parts of the Criminal Justice System. For this purpose, a national forum and local committees should be established.
2. More visible leadership of the Prison Service by a Director General who is and is seen to be the operational head and in day-to-day charge of the Service. To achieve this there should be a published "compact" or "contract" given by Ministers to the Director General of the Prison Service, who should be responsible for the performance of that "contract" and publicly answerable for the day-to-day operations of the Prison Service.
3. Increased delegation of responsibility to Governors of establishments.
4. An enhanced role for prison officers.
5. A "compact" or "contract" for each prisoner setting out the prisoner's expectations and responsibilities in the prison in which he or she is held
6. A national system of Accredited Standards, with which, in time, each prison establishment would be required to comply.
7. A new Prison Rule that no establishment should hold more prisoners than is provided for in its certified normal level of accommodation, with provisions for Parliament to be informed if exceptionally there is to be a material departure from that rule.
8. A public commitment from Ministers setting a timetable to provide access to sanitation for all inmates at the earliest practical date, not later than February 1996.
9. Better prospects for prisoners to maintain their links with families and the community through more visits and home leaves and through being located in community prisons as near to their homes as possible.
10. A division of prison establishments into small and more manageable and secure units.
11. A separate statement of purpose, separate conditions and generally a lower security categorisation for remand prisoners.
12. Improved standards of justice within prisons involving the giving of reasons to a prisoner for any decision which materially and adversely affects him; a grievance procedure and disciplinary proceedings which ensure that the Governor deals with most matters under his present powers; relieving Boards of Visitors of their adjudicatory role; and providing for final access to an independent Complaints Adjudicator.

The Guardian described the report as a blueprint for the restoration of "decency and justice into jails where conditions had become intolerable". Home Secretary Kenneth Baker welcomed the Woolf Report and pledged to end "slopping out" by 1994, and also accepted Woolf's recommendations for more visits, home leave and telephone calls. In contrast to his proposed reforms, Baker also proposed the introduction of a new offence of "prison mutiny" carrying a maximum sentence of ten years imprisonment, stating, "The events of last April marked a watershed in the history of prison service. We cannot, and will not, tolerate the savagery and vandalism in our prisons that we saw then".

== Prosecutions ==
The first prosecutions in relation to the riot began at Manchester Crown Court on 14 January 1992. The trial was conducted amid tight security, including armed police patrolling the area around the court, body searches for spectators and a specially constructed dock with sides made from bulletproof glass. Nine men went on trial charged with riot under Section 1 of the Public Order Act 1986, with six of them, including Paul Taylor and Alan Lord, also being charged with the murder of Derek White. On the first day one prisoner pleaded guilty to charges of riot and conspiracy to riot, and was also acquitted of the murder charge. The other defendants were also acquitted of murder due to the unreliability of eyewitness testimony and the possibility that White had died from a pre-existing thrombotic condition. On 16 April, four defendants including Taylor were convicted of rioting, and the remaining four including Lord were acquitted. Taylor received a ten-year sentence, the maximum sentence the judge had the power to impose. The sentences received by the other defendants ranged from four years to nine-and-a-half years imprisonment. By the end of the trial the total cost of the Strangeways riot, including refurbishing the prison and the costs of the police inquiry and court case, had reached £112 million.

The second trial began at the same court on 5 October 1992, and dealt with charges relating to the "battle for E wing" on 3 April 1990. There were fourteen defendants, including Lord and another man who was acquitted in the first trial, both of whom were added to the list of defendants after their acquittals. Two defendants pleaded guilty to violent disorder and received four- and five-year sentences, which due to the two years they had spent on remand awaiting trial resulted in them being freed. The remaining twelve defendants pleaded not guilty to conspiracy to commit grievous bodily harm with intent and conspiracy to riot. On 7 December 1992 David Bowen and Mark Azzopardi escaped from the prison van transferring them from HM Prison Hull to the court. Azzopardi was recaptured, before escaping from the court on 17 February 1993 along with five of the other defendants. At the conclusion of the trial two defendants were acquitted and the remainder found guilty of conspiracy to commit grievous bodily harm with intent, the lesser charge of conspiracy to riot automatically being dropped when guilty verdicts were announced on the first charge. When passing sentence, the judge remarked, "You had your period of arrogance and violence in front of the world, but now the price must be paid and paid by you". The defendants received sentences ranging from four years to ten years imprisonment, although only five defendants were in court to hear the verdict, as six defendants were still on the run after escaping and another was being treated at Ashworth Secure Hospital.

Following the second trial, a further twenty-six defendants were still due to be tried on charges relating to the riot. The Crown Prosecution Service accepted plea bargains where defendants pleaded guilty to violent disorder in exchange for the dropping of other charges, or in some cases all charges were dropped completely. On 20 September 1993 the last remaining defendant to maintain a plea of not guilty went on trial, and he was convicted of conspiracy to commit grievous bodily harm and sentenced to thirty months imprisonment. On 18 March 1994, six prisoners appeared in court on charges of escaping from custody during the second riot trial. Five of them pleaded guilty to escaping from custody on one occasion, and Azzopardi pleaded guilty to escaping on two occasions. Each was sentenced to eighteen months imprisonment for escaping from Manchester Crown Court, and Azzopardi received an additional two-year sentence for escaping from the van transporting him from HM Prison Hull to the court. In July 1994, David Bowen was convicted of attempting to pervert the course of justice by attempting to influence the jury in the first riot trial, and was sentenced to three years imprisonment. Taylor, who had already pleaded guilty to the same charge, also received a three-year sentence.

== Aftermath ==
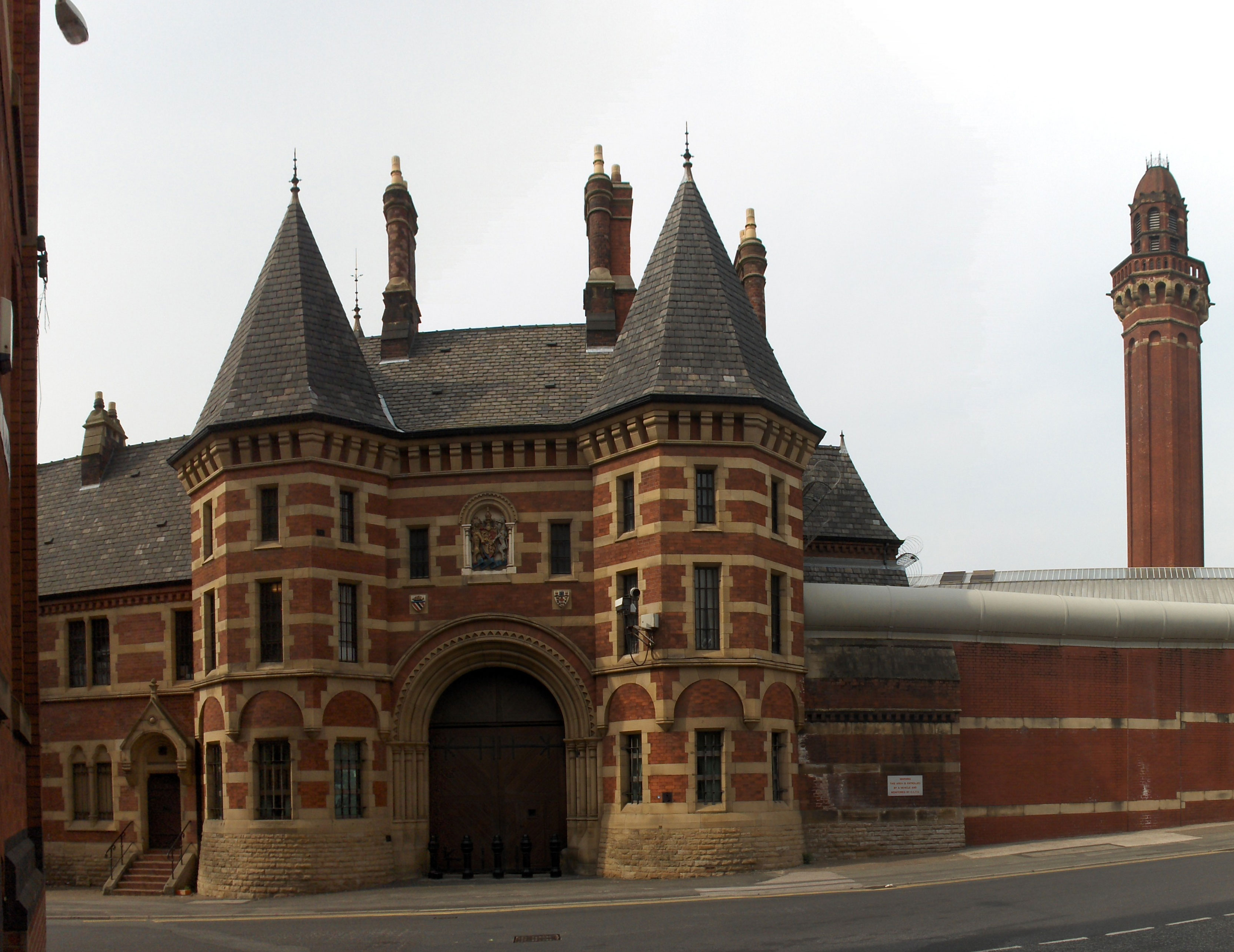
HM Prison Manchester in 2007

Strangeways was rebuilt and refurbished at a cost of £55 million, and was officially re-opened as HM Prison Manchester on 27 May 1994. The press were invited to view the new prison and talk to the prisoners by new governor Derek Lewis. A prisoner told the visiting journalists:

The better conditions in here are not down to the prison department. But for the riot, we would still be in the same old jail banged up all day and slopping out ... The rioters brought this about. These conditions ... should not have cost the lives of a prisoner, a prison officer and two huge court trials. They should have done it years ago but it took a riot to get them to do it.

"Slopping out" was abolished in England and Wales by 1996, and was scheduled to be abolished in Scotland by 1999. Due to budget restraints the abolition was delayed, and by 2004 prisoners in five of Scotland's sixteen prisons still had to "slop out". "Slopping out" ended at HM Young Offenders Institution Polmont in 2007, leaving HM Prison Peterhead as the last prison where inmates did not have access to proper sanitation, as 300 prisoners were forced to use chemical toilets due to the difficulty of installing modern plumbing in the prison's granite structure. Peterhead closed in December 2013.

In 2015, The Daily Telegraph reported that a prisoner serving a 27-year sentence was conducting a lone protest on the roof against conditions and was being cheered by other prisoners. The newspaper also referenced in its own report an interview with Lord Woolf from earlier in the year where he described prisoners being kept in intolerable conditions–as bad as at the time of the riots. Woolf recommended prisons were kept out of politics.

A December 2016 riot involving several hundred prisoners that occurred at HM Prison Birmingham was described by prison affairs academic Alex Cavendish as "probably the most serious riot in a B category prison since Strangeways went up". The incident began after a set of keys was stolen from a prison officer while he was trying to lock prisoners in their cells. Prisoners took over four of the jail's blocks and broke into the administrative area of the prison, where they smashed computer equipment and set personal records alight. Riot officers entered the jail and secured the blocks after twelve hours of disturbance.

== Bibliography ==
- Eamonn Carrabine (2004). Power, Discourse and Resistance: A Genealogy of the Strangeways Prison Riot. Ashgate Publishing. ISBN 978-0-7546-2172-0
- Nicki Jameson and Eric Allison (1995). Strangeways 1990: A Serious Disturbance. Larkin Publications. ISBN 978-0-905400-18-1
- Elaine Player and Michael Jenkins (1993). Prisons After Woolf: Reform Through Riot. Routledge. ISBN 978-0-415-07956-3
