= Stoke Heath, Shropshire =

Village in Shropshire, England

Coordinates: 52.866°N 2.528°W

Stoke Heath
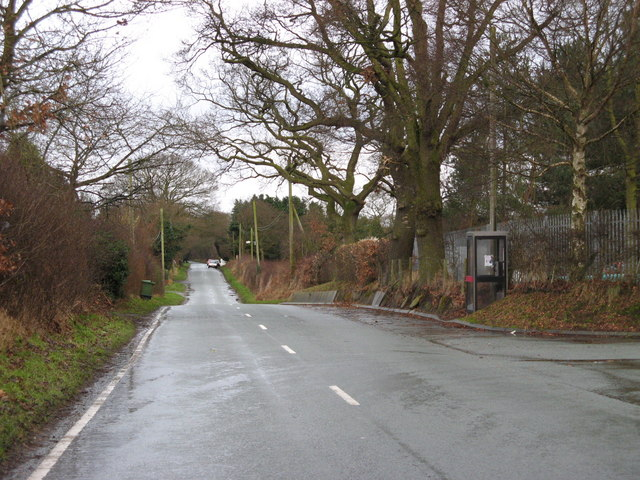
- Stoke Heath

- Location within Shropshire
- OS grid reference: SJ645300
- Civil parish: Stoke upon Tern
- Unitary authority: Shropshire
- Ceremonial county: Shropshire
- Region: West Midlands
- Country: England
- Sovereign state: United Kingdom
- Post town: MARKET DRAYTON
- Postcode district: TF9
- Dialling code: 01630
- Police: West Mercia
- Fire: Shropshire
- Ambulance: West Midlands
- UK Parliament: The Wrekin

Stoke Heath is a small village, located in the parish of Stoke upon Tern in Shropshire, England.

The village is the location of Stoke Heath Prison, a male prison and Young Offenders Institution for offenders over 18.

It is also the location of Stoke-on-Tern Primary School.

== See also ==
- Listed buildings in Stoke upon Tern
