= Stoke on Tern =

Village in Shropshire, England

Coordinates: 52.847°N 2.535°W

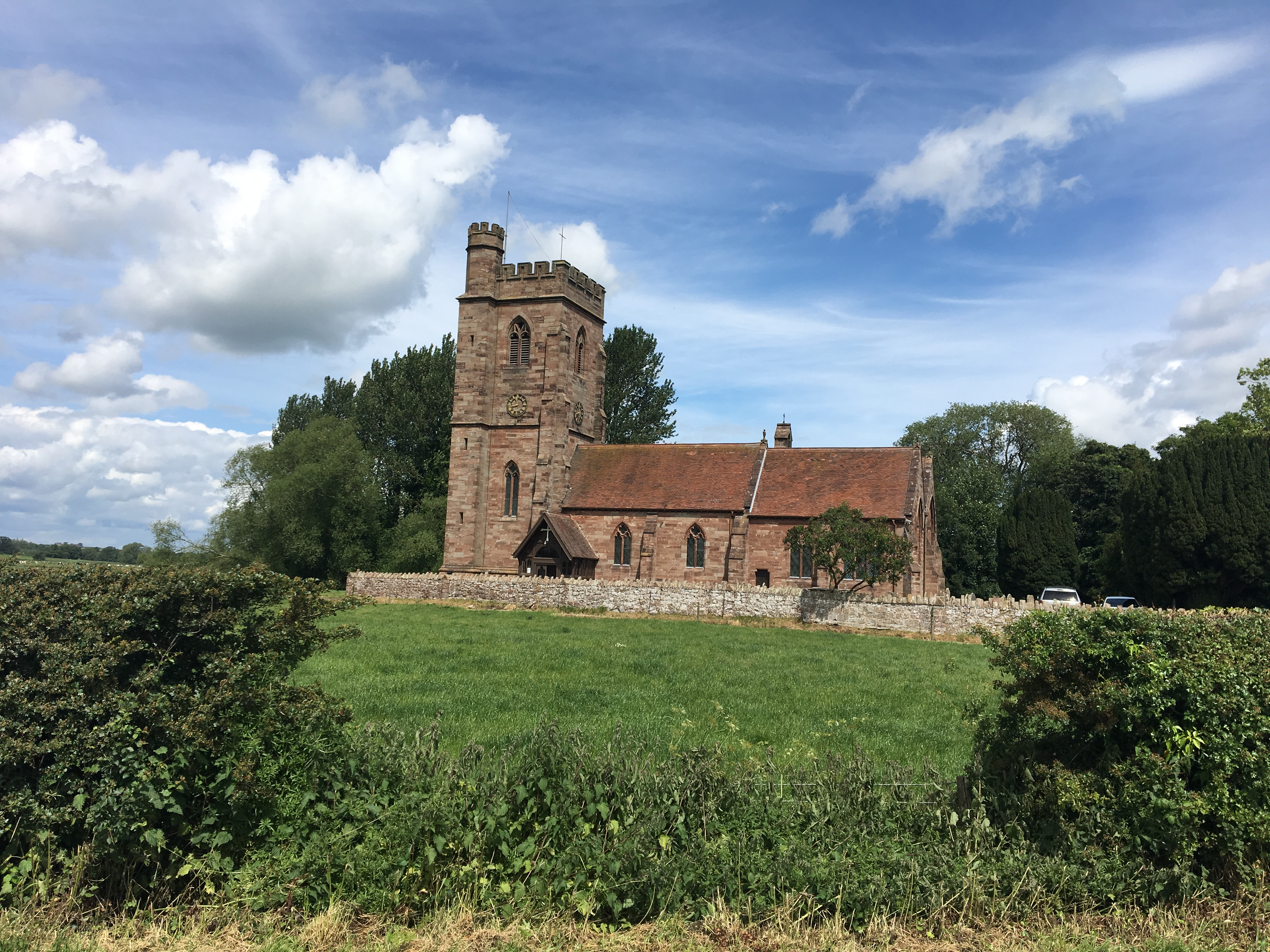
- St Peter's church, Stoke on Tern

- Location within Shropshire
- Population: 2,034 (2011)
- OS grid reference: SJ639278
- Civil parish: Stoke upon Tern
- Unitary authority: Shropshire
- Ceremonial county: Shropshire
- Region: West Midlands
- Country: England
- Sovereign state: United Kingdom
- Post town: MARKET DRAYTON
- Postcode district: TF9
- Dialling code: 01630
- Police: West Mercia
- Fire: Shropshire
- Ambulance: West Midlands
- UK Parliament: North Shropshire

Stoke on Tern is a village located in Shropshire, England, on the River Tern. The civil parish is known as Stoke upon Tern.

== History ==
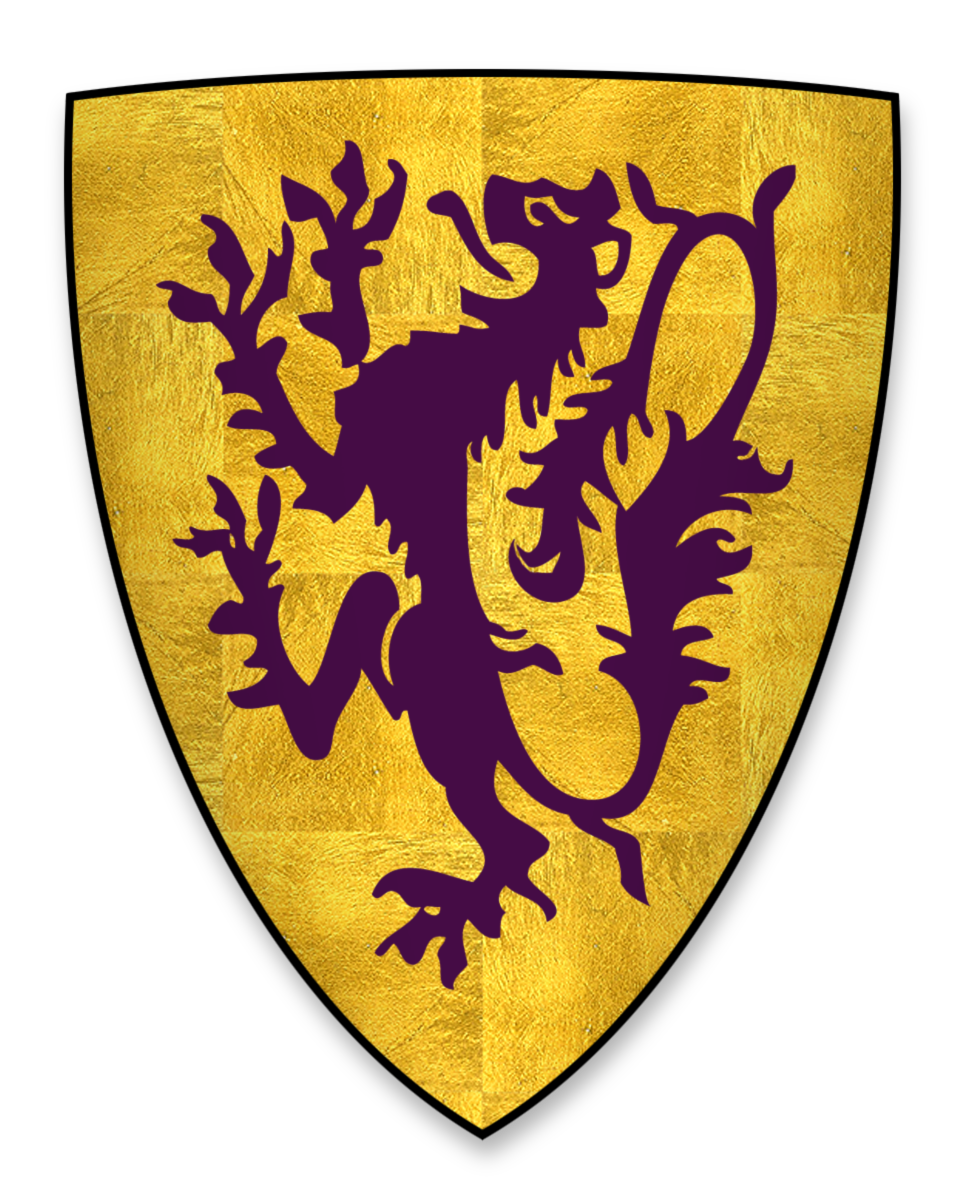
Arms of the Lacy family, earliest known lords of the manor

Stoke on Turn was a substantial Domesday manor well-established by at least the later 1000s. Roger de Lacy is recorded as holding it, and the presence of priest here in the 11th century suggest a church was already present and this was a principle manor for the de Lacys (and their successors the de Say and Vernon families). There are records of a moat that is square, of significant scale, in the area of the church. This could be a lordly house of the 1200s/1300s.

=== Church ===
Coat of arms of the Vernon Family

Arms of the se Sey family

The arms of two families who followed the de Lacy's as Lords of the manor Align =

The Anglican Church of St Peter, Stoke on Tern, has a Sunday service every other week and a Wednesday prayer meeting four times a month. The church building (1874–1875) and some concurrent and earlier features to be found in and around it are Grade II listed. There is a war memorial listing the First World War victims of Stoke and Hodnet held in St Luke's Church, Hodnet.

==== The Corbet Monument ====
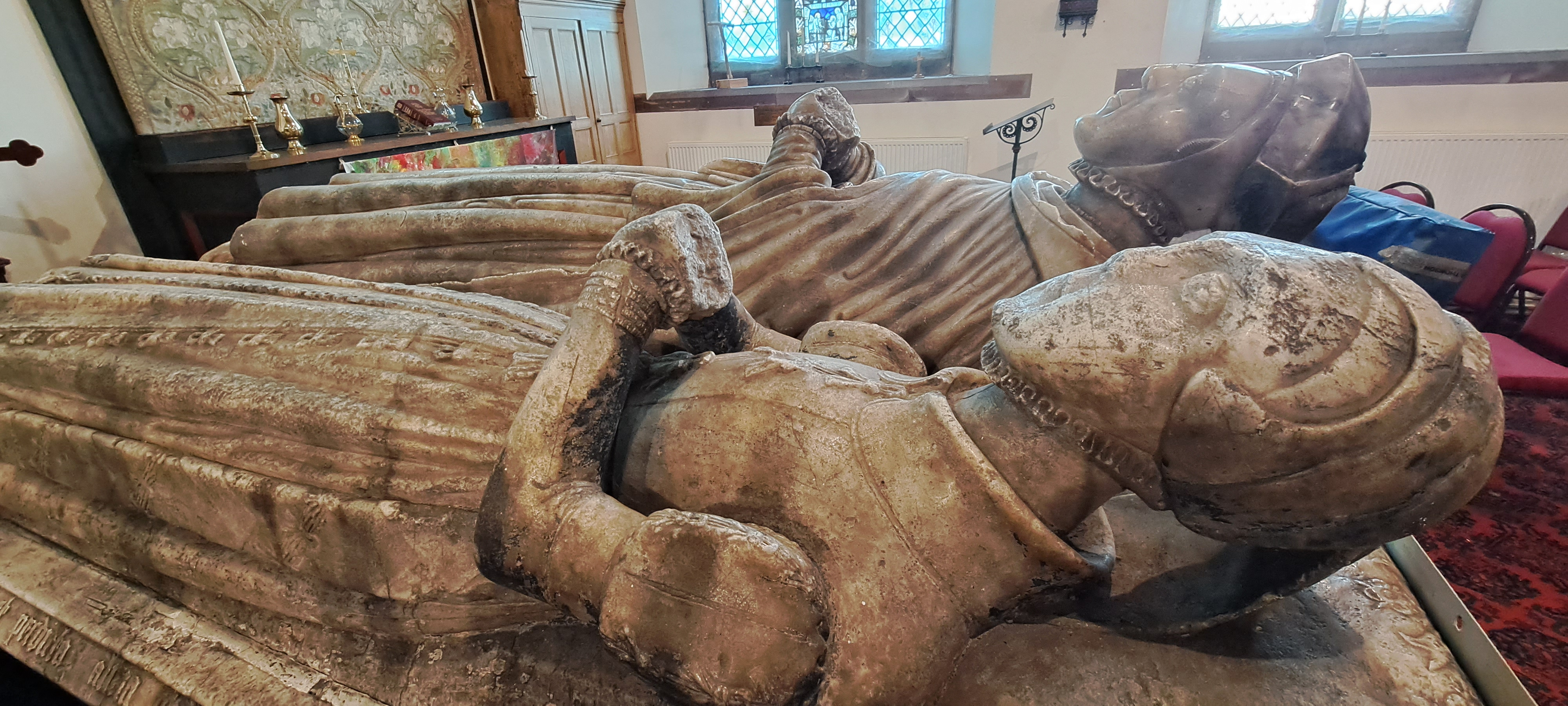
The Corbet Monument: this tomb manifests links of the parishioners of the church, the Geneva Bible, Shakespeare's family and the play 'As You Like It'

One of the most important artefacts in the church is the Corbet family monument, which dates from the third quarter of the 16th century, and furnishes Stoke on Tern with connections to the family of William Shakespeare (and the setting of his play As You Like It and individuals potentially memorialised in that work and others) as well as the project to deliver the Geneva Bible. The monument was raised to Reginald Corbet (d. 1566), a notable lawyer in the Tudor period, and his wife Alice Gratewood.

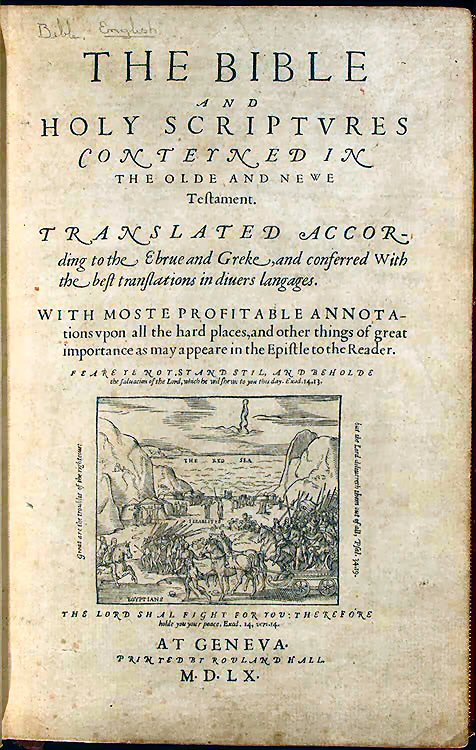
The heiresses of the publisher of the Geneva Bible, Alice Corbet, is in the church

Alice was an heiress of her uncle Sir Rowland Hill of Soulton, who published the Geneva Bible and is considered the inspiration for the character Old Sir Rowland in As You Like It, which is also understood to be inspired by this part of Shropshire, which is in on the edge of the Forest of Arden, the play's setting. These links to Shakespeare continue in the marriage of one of the daughters of the marriage represented in the tomb, when their daughter Elizabeth Corbett marries a son of the Arden family, of which Shakespeare's mother Mary is part.

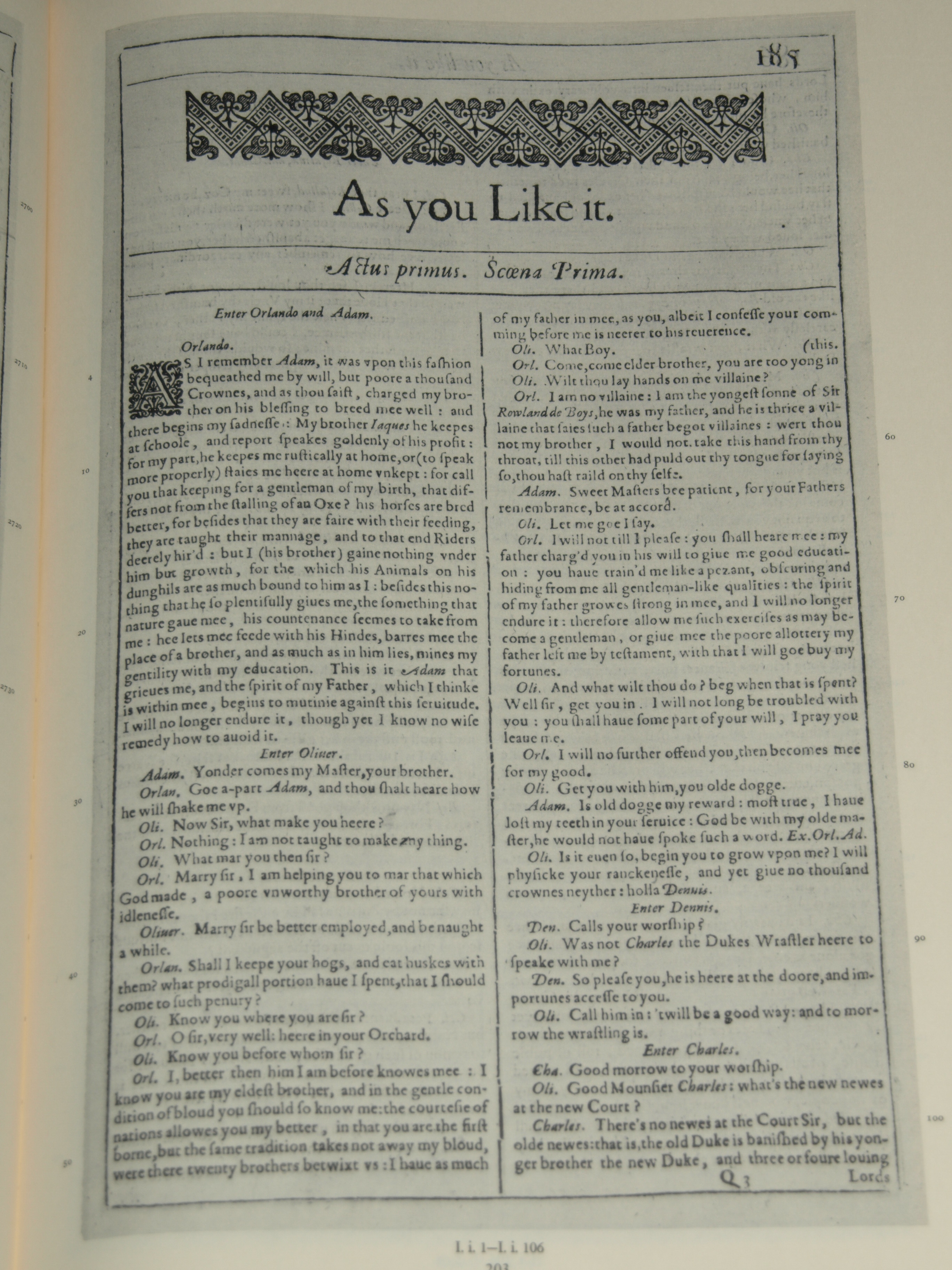
It has been speculated that Rowland Hill is the inspiration for Rowland de Bois in As You Like It.

More specifically, Edward Arden of Park Hall, Castle Bromwich, was Sheriff of Warwickshire in 1575 and was the son of William Arden (d. 1545) was a second cousin of Mary Shakespeare. In 1583, he came under suspicion for being head of a family that had remained loyal to the Catholic Church, and was sentenced for allegedly plotting against Elizabeth I. His son, Robert Arden also of Park Hall (b. 1553) married Elizabeth Corbett (b. 1551), the great niece and heiress of Sir Rowland Hill and this alliance with important Protestant families was important in repairing the standing of the ancient Arden family.

Reginald held several Staffordshire and Shropshire manors, including Stoke.

== Human and physical geography ==
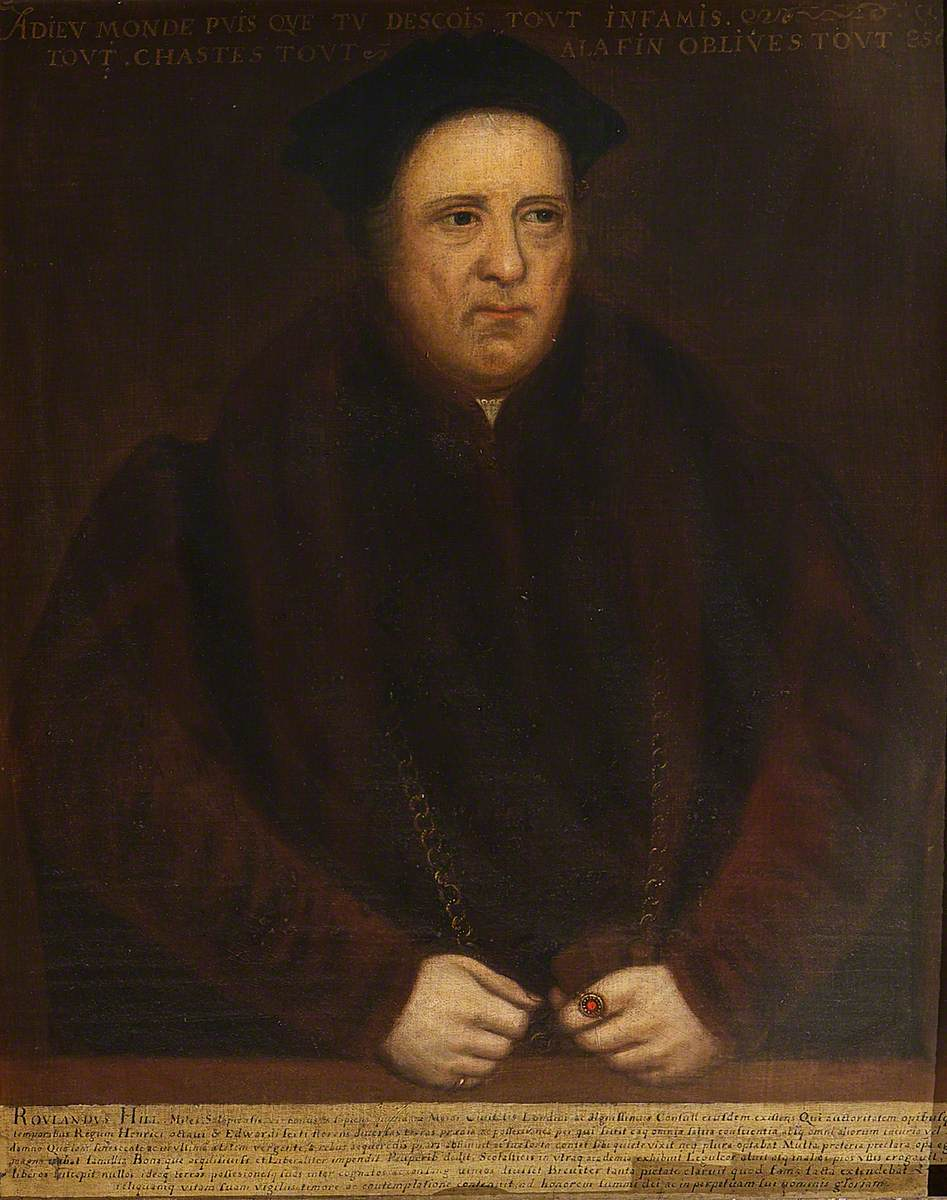
Sir Rowland Hill

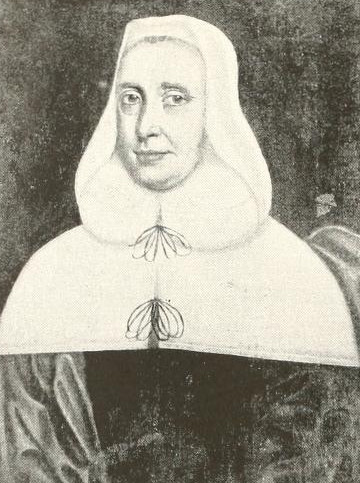
Reginald Corbet

Two important 16th century statesmen associated with the manor

The village straddles the River Tern, which flows through the south and west of the village. The parish includes the smaller settlements of Eaton upon Tern, Ollerton, Stoke Heath and Wistanswick. Its population of 1,740 in 440 households at the time of the 2001 census rose to 2,034 in 492 households at the 2011 Census. It was estimated to be 2,431 in 2019.

== Amenities and transport ==
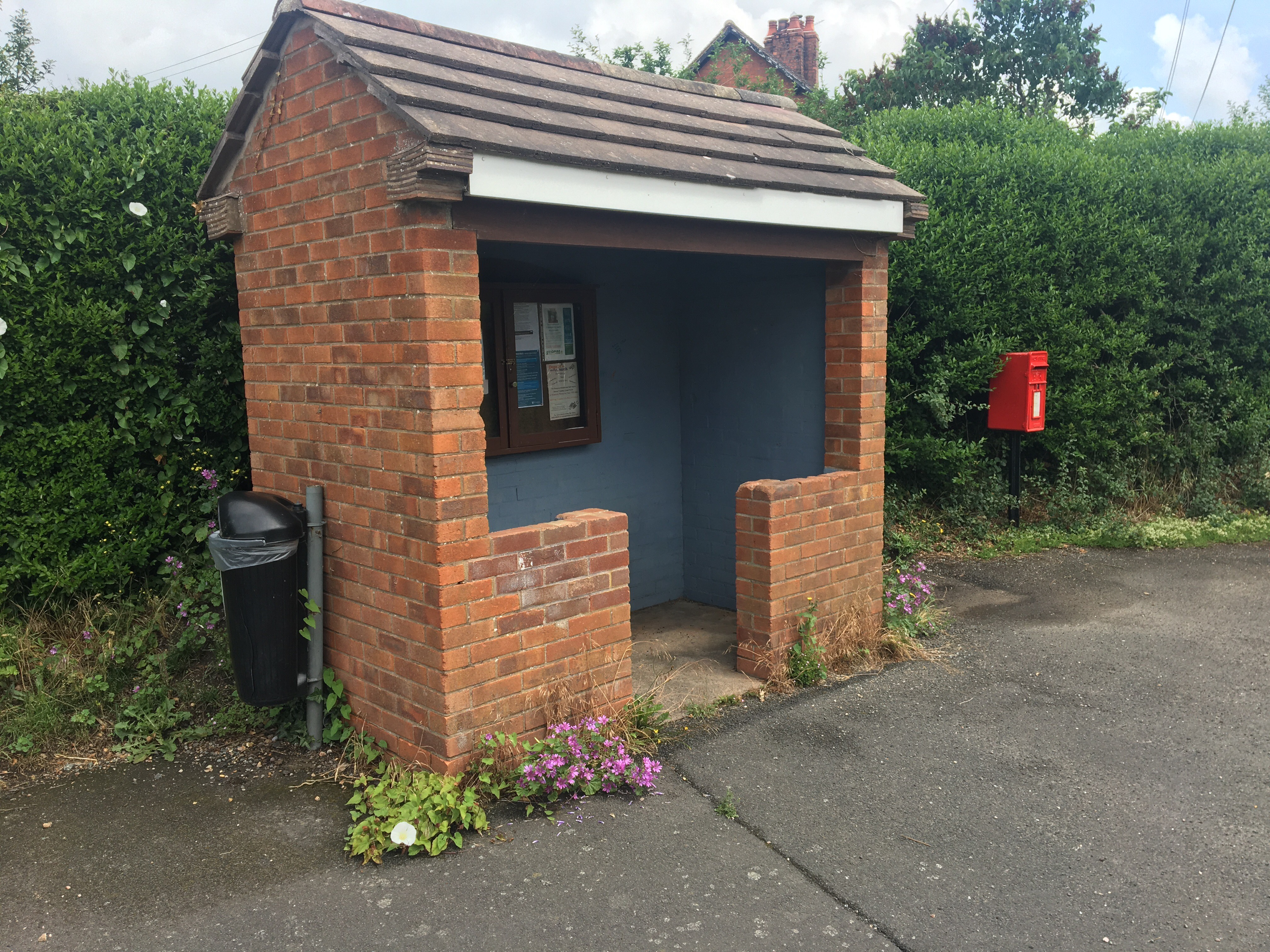
The village's disused bus stop

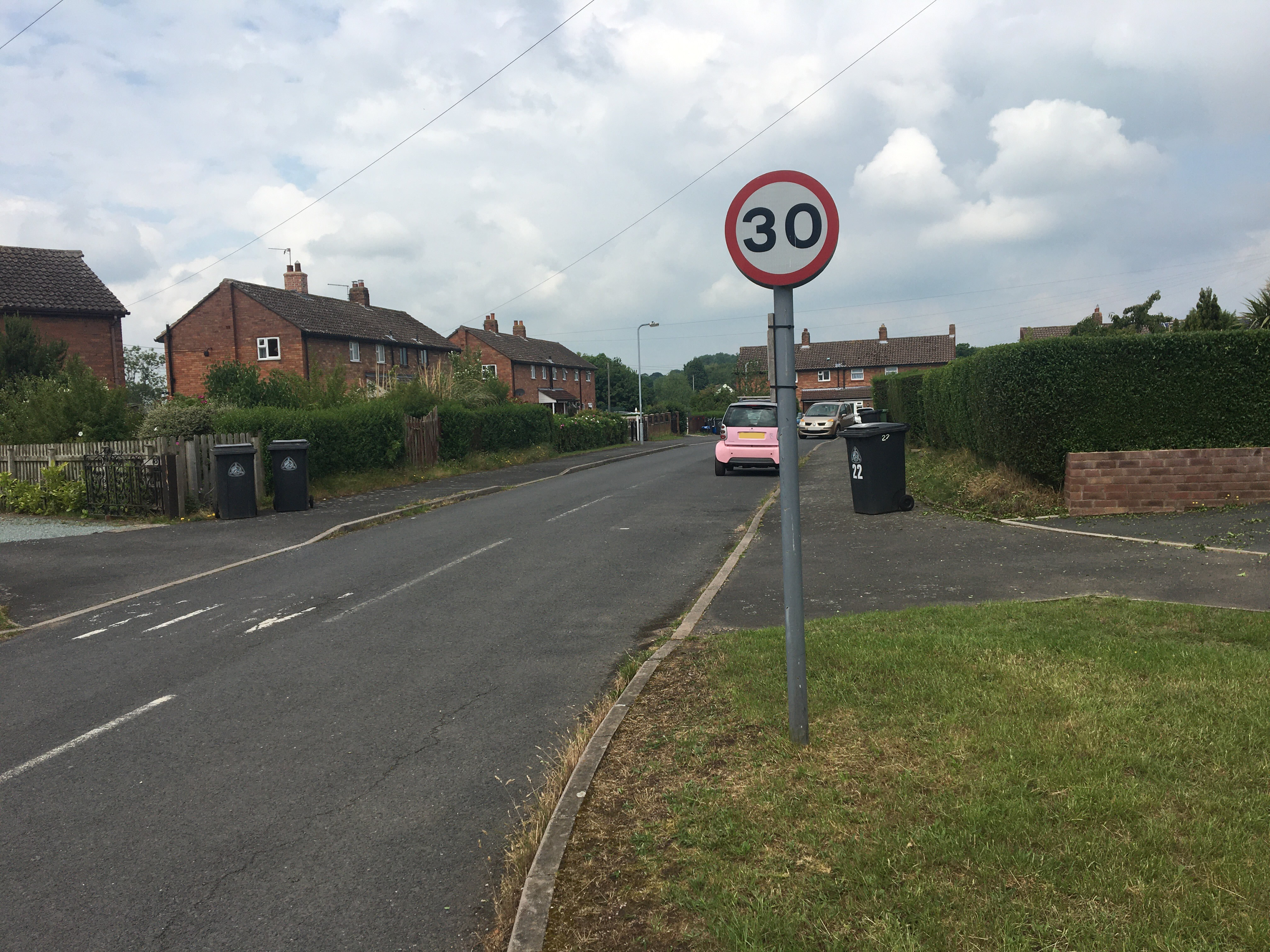
Langley Dale, the main residential street of the village

Stoke has a four-class primary school with a nursery attached. It continued to be graded "good" after a short Ofsted inspection in January 2018.

The nearest medical centre is at Hodnet (2.6 miles/4.2 km). The nearest shopping facilities and other amenities are at Market Drayton (6.5 miles/10.5 km).

Since 2020 there has been no bus service serving the village, although the 341 and 342 routes between Market Drayton and Telford via Childs Ercall were operated by Arriva Midlands until 2016. There have been petitions to reinstate the service. The village's nearest bus stop is now in Hodnet, with bus links to Shrewsbury and Market Drayton.

The edges of the parish are crossed by the main A53 and A41 roads.

== Notable persons ==
- William Hill, (d. 1585) the priest of the parish in the middle 1500s, brother of Sir Rowland Hill, Geneva Bible publisher; possibly a royal chaplain.
- Benjamin Whichcote (1609–1683), Puritan divine and 19th Provost of King's College, Cambridge, was born at Whichcote Hall, Stoke on Tern.

== See also ==
- Listed buildings in Stoke upon Tern
