= HM Prison Stoke Heath =

Prison in Shropshire, England

Coordinates: 52.869222°N 2.523529°W

HMP Stoke Heath
- Interactive map of HMP Stoke Heath
- Location: Stoke Heath, Shropshire
- Security class: Adult Males/Young Offenders
- Population: 734 (July 2025)
- Opened: 1964
- Managed by: HM Prison Services
- Governor: Rachel James
- Website: Stoke Heath at justice.gov.uk

HM Prison Stoke Heath is an adult male Category C prison and Young Offenders Institution, located in the village of Stoke Heath (near Market Drayton) in Shropshire, England. The prison is operated by His Majesty's Prison Service.

== History ==
Stoke Heath was built in 1964 as a Category C prison for adult males. It was converted to a Borstal 2 years later and, up until 2011, was used to hold Young Offenders. The establishment now houses prisoners over the age of 18.

During the weekend of 7-8 April 1990, a 24-hour rooftop protest by prisoners took place in apparent solidarity with the Strangeways Prison riot then going on in Manchester.

At the beginning of December 2004 the Howard League for Penal Reform accused Stoke Heath of abusing the human rights of young offenders. The Howard League’s main criticism was concerned with the use of strip cells by the staff of Stoke Heath.

In October 2006 four prison officers were injured in a riot involving more than 30 inmates at Stoke Heath. None of the inmates were injured during the disturbance.

In 2007 a spot inspection criticized Stoke Heath for failing to make improvements recommended in a 2005 inspection. The inspectorate recommended that the prison must refurbish its "unacceptably grubby" segregation unit and establish proper risk assessments for strip searches.

In 2013 Stoke Heath implemented the pepper course to help reintegrate offenders back into the community using the pepper principals.

== The prison today ==
Stoke Heath houses male adults and Young Offenders of 18 years and above. Because of this, education and training for inmates is the main focus of the prison. Education and training courses are provided by The Manchester College. A variety of courses and vocational training placements are offered, most of which can lead to NVQ qualifications in related fields.

In addition, the prison's gym and sports department offer various physical education courses, as well as being available for recreational use. The prison also has a multi-faith chaplaincy.
