= Old Hall, Asfordby =

Historic building in Leicestershire, England

Coordinates: 52°45′51″N 0°57′14″W

The Old Hall is a Jacobean former manor house in the village of Asfordby, Leicestershire. Built of brick c. 1620, it has three gables. It is a Grade II* Listed Building. Its 18th-century barn, 19th-century coach house and stable, and well pump dated 1776 are Grade II Listed Buildings.

== Notes and references ==
=== Sources ===
- Pevsner, Nikolaus (1960). The Buildings of England: Leicestershire and Rutland (Harmondsworth: Penguin Books)
