= Old Park, Cornwall =

Coordinates: 50.459°N 4.480°W

Old Park
- Location within Cornwall
- OS grid reference: SX240651
- Civil parish: Liskeard
- Unitary authority: Cornwall
- Ceremonial county: Cornwall
- Region: South West
- Country: England
- Sovereign state: United Kingdom

Old Park is a hamlet in the parish of Liskeard, Cornwall, England, UK.
