= The Old Hall, Ripon =

Building in Ripon, North Yorkshire, England

Coordinates: 54°08′03″N 1°31′12″W

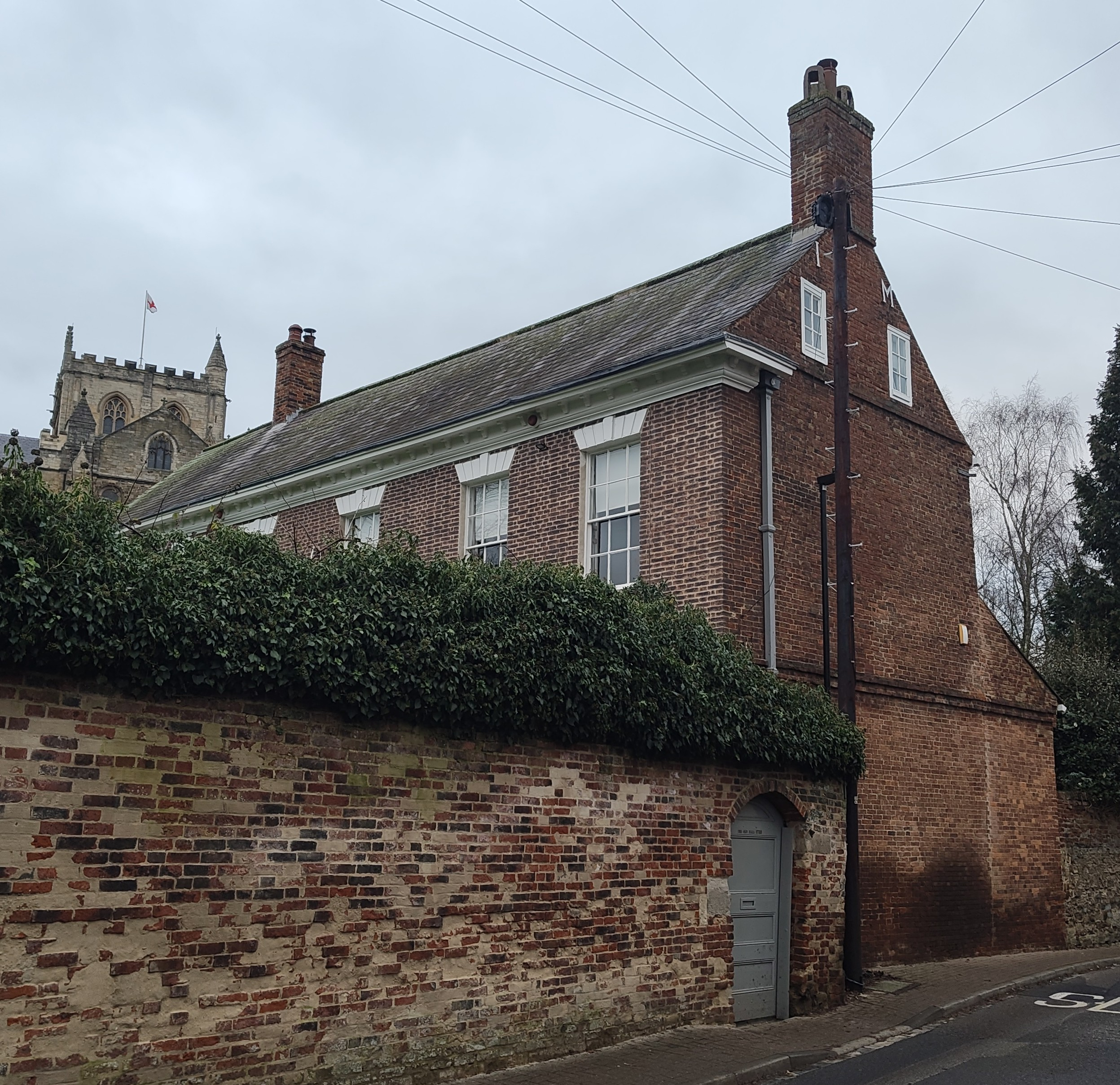
The building, in 2025

The Old Hall is a historic building in Ripon, a city in North Yorkshire, in England.

The house, on High St Agnesgate, was built in 1738. It was altered in the mid 19th century, the work including a new roof. From 1841 to 1858 it was used as a resident by a canon of Ripon Cathedral, including Charles Dodgson from 1852 to 1858, with his son Lewis Carroll spending several months of the year at the property. The house was grade II* listed in 1949. In 2025, it was marketed for sale for £1.6 million, at which time it had six bedrooms, five reception rooms and four bathrooms.

The house, at right angles to the street, is built of red brick, with a modillion eaves cornice and a Welsh slate roof. There are two storeys and attics, five bays, a recessed bay to the north, and a rear wing. The doorway has a round head and channelled quoins and voussoirs. There are two French windows, and the other windows are sashes with channelled voussoirs. Inside, there is original high quality plasterwork, and there are several murals, including a scene of the Judgement of Paris on the ceiling of the upper hall.

== See also ==
- Grade II* listed buildings in North Yorkshire (district)
- Listed buildings in Ripon
