= Wistanswick =

Village in Shropshire, England

Coordinates: 52.856°N 2.499°W

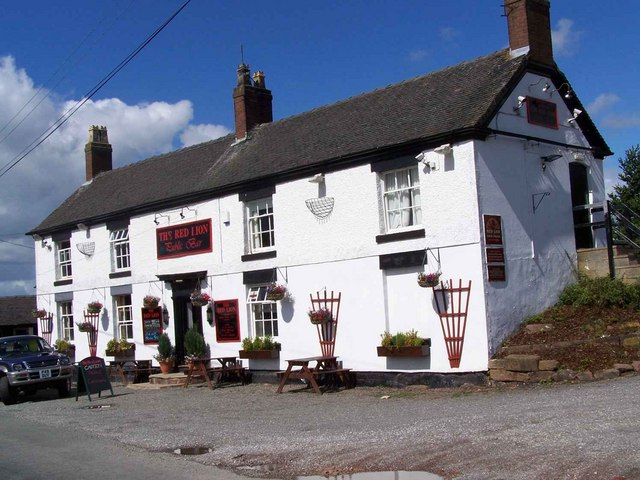
- The Red Lion public house at Wistanswick

- Location within Shropshire
- OS grid reference: SJ664288
- Civil parish: Stoke upon Tern
- Unitary authority: Shropshire
- Ceremonial county: Shropshire
- Region: West Midlands
- Country: England
- Sovereign state: United Kingdom
- Post town: MARKET DRAYTON
- Postcode district: TF9
- Dialling code: 01630
- Police: West Mercia
- Fire: Shropshire
- Ambulance: West Midlands
- UK Parliament: North Shropshire

Wistanswick (/wɪstənzwɪk/ WISS-tənz-wik) is a small village, located in the parish of Stoke upon Tern in Shropshire, England. It is located in a rural area approximately five miles south of Market Drayton just off the A41. The village contains a public house (pictured right) and a URC chapel.

== See also ==
- Listed buildings in Stoke upon Tern
