= Oldways End =

Hamlet in England

Coordinates: 51.016667°N 3.616667°W

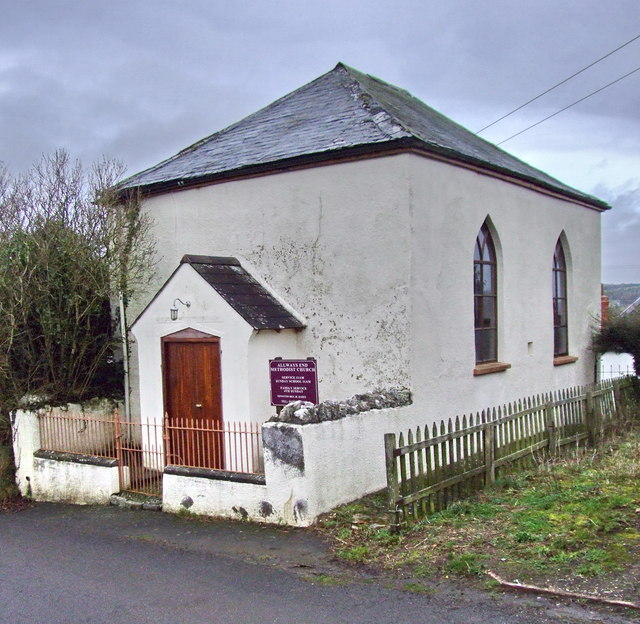
- Methodist Chapel, Oldways End

- Location within Devon
- OS grid reference: SS8669625388
- Civil parish: East Anstey; Dulverton; Brushford
- District: North Devon
- Unitary authority: Somerset
- Shire county: Devon
- Region: South West
- Country: England
- Sovereign state: United Kingdom
- Post town: TIVERTON
- Postcode district: EX16
- Dialling code: 01398
- Police: Devon and Cornwall
- Fire: Devon and Somerset
- Ambulance: South Western
- UK Parliament: North Devon

Oldways End is a hamlet on the boundary of the North Devon district of Devon and the unitary authority of Somerset, in England. Its nearest town is Tiverton, which lies approximately 9 1/2 miles (15.3 km) south-west from the hamlet.
