= Ollerton, Shropshire =

Village in Shropshire, England

Coordinates: 52.822°N 2.522°W

Ollerton
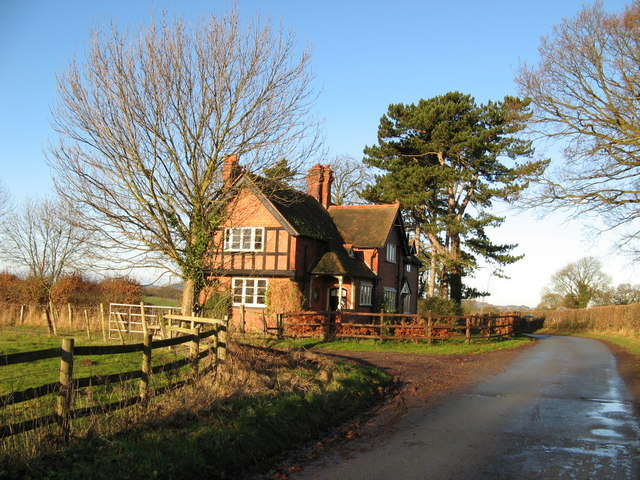
- Lodge house for Peplow Hall, Ollerton

- Location within Shropshire
- OS grid reference: SJ649251
- Civil parish: Stoke upon Tern
- Unitary authority: Shropshire
- Ceremonial county: Shropshire
- Region: West Midlands
- Country: England
- Sovereign state: United Kingdom
- Post town: MARKET DRAYTON
- Postcode district: TF9
- Dialling code: 01952
- Police: West Mercia
- Fire: Shropshire
- Ambulance: West Midlands
- UK Parliament: The Wrekin

Ollerton is a small village, located in the parish of Stoke upon Tern in Shropshire, England.

Ollerton is located in a rural area approximately midway between the towns of Telford and Market Drayton; immediately to the west is the hamlet of Peplow, while Child's Ercall lies to the east.

== See also ==
- Listed buildings in Stoke upon Tern
