= Listed buildings in Stoke upon Tern =

Stoke upon Tern is a civil parish in Shropshire, England. It contains 21 listed buildings that are recorded in the National Heritage List for England. Of these, one is listed at Grade II*, the middle of the three grades, and the others are at Grade II, the lowest grade. The parish includes the villages of Stoke on Tern, Ollerton, and Wistanswick and smaller settlements, and is otherwise rural. Most of the listed buildings are farmhouses and farm buildings, many of which are timber framed. The other listed buildings consist of a church with groups of coffin slabs and a former font in the churchyard, another church, a row of cottages, two milestones, a bridge, and an animal pound.

== Key ==
Grade	Criteria
II*	Particularly important buildings of more than special interest
II	Buildings of national importance and special interest

== Buildings ==
Name and location	Photograph	Date	Notes	Grade
Group of four coffin slabs 52.84816°N 2.53887°W	—	12th century (probable)	The coffin slabs are in the churchyard of St Peter's Church. One grave slab is the oldest, the others probably from the 13th or 14th century. They are in red sandstone, the oldest has foliage ornament, and the others have an incised cross and border.	II
Former font 52.84820°N 2.53834°W	—	13th century (possible)	The font is in the churchyard of St Peter's Church. It is in red sandstone, and has a circular tapered shape, and a moulded top.	II
Pair of coffin slabs 52.84817°N 2.53871°W	—	13th or 14th century (probable)	The coffin slabs are in the churchyard of St Peter's Church. They are in red sandstone, and each has an incised cross and border. Only the top half of the western slab remains.	II
Pair of coffin slabs 52.84817°N 2.53876°W	—	13th or 14th century (probable)	The coffin slabs are in the churchyard of St Peter's Church. They are in red sandstone, and each has an incised cross and border.	II
Petsey Farmhouse; 52.84551°N 2.54126°W	—	Early 16th century	The farmhouse was built in two phases, the second in the 17th century, and has subsequently been altered. It is timber framed with red brick nogging, some rebuilding in painted brick, and has a tile roof. There are two storeys and an H-shaped plan, consisting of a hall range and two cross-wings. The upper storey and gables are jettied with chamfered or moulded bressumers. On the front is a two-storey porch, the doorway has a moulded architrave, and the windows are casements. Inside are wall paintings with foliage or grotesque motifs.	II
Cotton Farmhouse; 52.84576°N 2.55058°W	—	Mid to late 16th century	The farmhouse was altered and extended though the following centuries. The early part is timber framed with red brick nogging, and it has been partly refaced, underbuilt, rebuilt, and extended in red brick and red sandstone. There are two storeys, and a plan that consists of a three-bay main range, and three rear wings of different dates. Parts of the upper storey and some gables are jettied with moulded bressumers. The windows are casements; they and the doorway have segmental heads.	II
Barn southeast of Mayfield House; 52.82329°N 2.52126°W	—	c. 1600	The barn is timber framed with red brick nogging, weatherboarding on the gables, one wall rebuilt in red brick, and a corrugated iron roof. There are two bays, and the barn contains slatted windows and two doors.	II
Firs Farmhouse; 52.83382°N 2.51095°W	—	Early to mid 17th century	The farmhouse was extended in the 18th century, and both parts have tile roofs and casement windows. The original part is a timber framed hall range with red brick nogging on a brick plinth, and some rebuilding in red brick. It has one storey and an attic, and three bays, a gabled porch, and a gabled dormer. The later cross-wing forms a T-shaped plan, it is in red brick with bands, a dentilled eaves cornice, a roof with parapeted gable ends and moulded kneelers, and two storeys.	II
Old Bramblecote; 52.85709°N 2.49453°W	—	1643	The farmhouse was extended in the 20th century. The original part is timber framed with brick nogging and a shingled roof, and the extension is rendered. There is one storey and an attic, three bays, and a gabled rear wing. On the front is a gabled porch, and the windows are casements. There are two gabled dormers, the left one with a jettied gable and a moulded and dated bressumer, and the right gable end is also slightly jettied.	II
Farm buildings, Elms Farm; 52.82278°N 2.52080°W	—	Mid 17th century	The farm buildings consist of a barn and cowhouses, and were extended in the 18th century. The earlier part is timber framed with red brick nogging, underbuilt and extended in red brick, and with a corrugated asbestos roof. It has one storey and a loft, and forms an L-shaped plan with the later part, which is in brick on a high plinth. This part contains cruciform vents, loft doors, stable doors, and barn doors.	II
Stoke Park Farmhouse; 52.84222°N 2.51258°W	—	1744	The farmhouse was extended at the rear in the 19th century. It is in red brick on a moulded plinth, with grey sandstone dressings, chamfered quoins, a moulded string course, a moulded eaves cornice, and a hipped tile roof. There are three storeys, five bays, a rear service block, and a two-storey rear extension. The central doorway has an architrave, a rectangular fanlight, a frieze, and a triangular pediment on console brackets. The windows are sashes with moulded sills, rusticated lintels and raised keystones, and there are gabled eaves dormers.	II*
The Bendles; 52.83098°N 2.51837°W	—	Mid 18th century	A red brick farmhouse with bands, a dentilled eaves cornice, and a tile roof with parapeted gable ends, moulded kneelers, and stone copings. There are two storeys and an attic, a front of five bays, three bays at the rear, and a lean-to two-storey extension on the right. The doorway has a rectangular fanlight, the windows are cross-windows with segmental heads, and there is a central eaves dormer.	II
Woodhouse Farmhouse; 52.83555°N 2.53226°W	—	1754–58	The farmhouse was designed by William Baker in Gothick style. It is in red brick on a plinth, and has a dentilled eaves cornice and a pyramidal tile roof. There are two storeys, an attic and a basement, a square plan with sides of three bays, and a two-storey service wing at the rear with a crow-stepped gable. The middle bay on the front and sides has a stepped embattled parapet and contains a Gothick window with Y-tracery. The other windows are sashes with segmental heads. The doorway has reeded pilaster strips, panelled reveals and soffits, a moulded impost band, a fanlight with intersecting tracery, an entablature, a frieze containing paterae, and an open triangular pediment with a dentilled cornice.	II
9 and 9A Eaton upon Tern; 52.80415°N 2.51458°W	—	Mid to late 18th century	A pair of red brick cottages on a red sandstone plinth to the right, with a band, a dentilled eaves cornice, and a tile roof. There are two storeys and five bays. The windows are casements; the windows in the ground floor and the doorway have segmental heads.	II
Heathcote Farmhouse and wall 52.85047°N 2.51516°W	—	Mid to late 18th century	The farmhouse is in painted brick with rendered dressings, quoins, a band, a moulded dentilled eaves cornice, and a tile roof with parapeted gables, moulded kneelers and copings. There are two storeys and an attic and three storeys at the rear, a front of two bays, and a service wing to the right with one storey and an attic. The central doorway has a moulded architrave, panelled rebates, an impost band, and a rectangular fanlight. The windows in the main part are sashes with rusticated lintels and raised keystones, and in the service wing are casement windows and two gabled eaves dormers. The garden wall is in red brick with stone coping and buttresses.	II
Milestone near Sweet Appletree; 52.85700°N 2.48666°W	—	Late 18th century	The milestone is on the southwest side of the A41 road, and is in red sandstone with cast iron plates. It has a triangular section on a square base, and the plates are inscribed with the distances in miles to Chester and to Newport.	II
Milestone near Warran Farmhouse; 52.87496°N 2.52175°W		Late 18th century	The milestone is on the southwest side of the A41 road, and is in red sandstone with cast iron plates. It has a triangular section on a square base, and the plates are inscribed with the distances in miles to Chester and to Newport. On the base is a plate inscribed "STOKE HEATH".	II
Stoke Bridge; 52.84690°N 2.54075°W		1789	The bridge carries a road over the River Tern, and its parapets were raised in the 19th century. It is in sandstone with brick soffits, and has a hump-back shape. The bridge consists of a segmental arch flanked by a pair of smaller segmental arches. It has stepped voussoirs, a raised keystone, parapets, and square end piers.	II
Village pound 52.82248°N 2.52112°W	—	Late 18th or early 19th century	The pound is in sandstone, and consists of a rectangular enclosure. The walls are about 5 feet (1.5 m) high, and there is a gateway, but the gate is missing.	II
Wistanwick United Reformed Church; 52.85576°N 2.49356°W		c. 1805	Originally a Congregational church, it was doubled in size in about 1860. The chapel is in red sandstone with a coved eaves cornice and a tile roof. There are two parallel ranges at right angles to the road. On the front are two gabled porches, and on the front and the sides are round-arched small-paned cast iron windows with stone sills. In front of the chapel is a wall and a cast iron gate enclosing a small forecourt, and at the rear of the south range is a small manse.	II
St Peter's Church; 52.84814°N 2.53870°W		1874–5	The church is in red sandstone with a tile roof, and is in Geometrical style. It consists of a nave, a south aisle, a south porch, a chancel with a south chapel and a north vestry and a southwest tower. The tower has two tall stages, angle buttresses, a southwest stair turret with an octagonal top stage, and clock faces on the east and west sides. The tower and the turret have embattled parapets. The east window has five lights.	II
