= Oldwood, Worcestershire =

Coordinates: 52.29779°N 2.60117°W

Oldwood
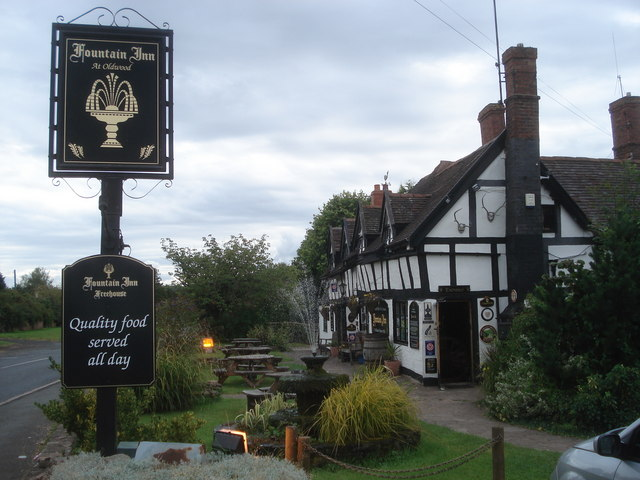
- The Fountain Inn

- Location within Worcestershire
- OS grid reference: SO591668
- District: Malvern Hills
- Shire county: Worcestershire
- Region: West Midlands
- Country: England
- Sovereign state: United Kingdom
- Post town: TENBURY WELLS
- Postcode district: WR15
- Police: West Mercia
- Fire: Hereford and Worcester
- Ambulance: West Midlands

Oldwood is a village in the English county of Worcestershire.

Oldwood is located on the A4112 road a mile southwest of the market town of Tenbury Wells.
