= Winterbourne =

Winterbourne may refer to:

== Geography ==
- Winterbourne (stream), a stream or river that is dry in summer

== Places ==
=== Canada ===
- Winterbourne, Ontario, unincorporated community

=== England ===
- Winterbourne, Berkshire, village and civil parish
- Winterbourne, Gloucestershire, South Gloucestershire, village and civil parish
  - Winterbourne Down, Gloucestershire, village
  - Winterbourne railway station
  - Winterbourne United F.C.
  - Winterbourne View, former private hospital for the disabled
- Winterbourne, Kent, a hamlet in Boughton under Blean parish
- Winterbourne, Wiltshire, civil parish with three villages:
  - Winterbourne Dauntsey
  - Winterbourne Earls
  - Winterbourne Gunner
- Winterbourne Abbas, Dorset, village and civil parish
- Winterbourne Bassett, Wiltshire, village and civil parish
- Winterbourne Down, Wiltshire, hill overlooking Firsdown
- Winterbourne Monkton, Wiltshire, village and civil parish
- Winterbourne Steepleton, Dorset, village and civil parish
- Winterbourne Stoke, Wiltshire, village and civil parish

=== United States ===
- Winterbourne (Orange Park, Florida), also known as the John Ferguson House

== Other uses ==
- Winterbourne Academy, South Gloucestershire, England
- Winterbourne Botanic Garden, Birmingham, England
- Winterbourne Boys' Academy, London Borough of Croydon
- Winterbourne United F.C., South Gloucestershire, England
- Winterbourne (group), a musical group from Australia

== See also ==
- Winterborne (disambiguation)
