= Chalk stream =

Rivers rising from chalk bedrock

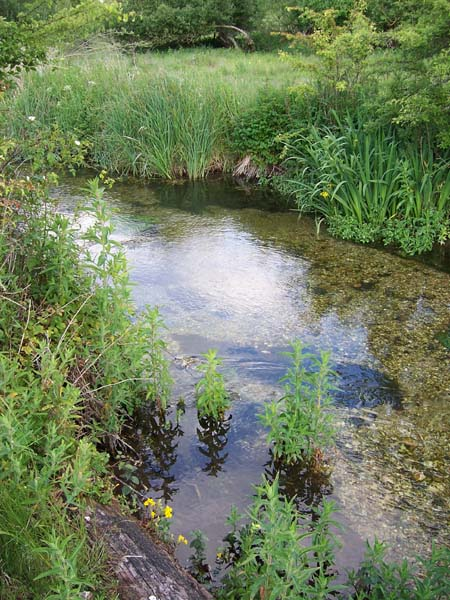
The River Bourne at Winterbourne Gunner, a typical chalk stream

Chalk streams are rivers that rise from springs in landscapes with chalk bedrock. Since chalk is permeable, water easily percolates through the ground to the water table and chalk streams therefore receive little surface runoff. As a result, the water in the streams contains little organic matter and sediment and is generally very clear. (Note: WWF-UK (2014).. . A "chalk stream" is broadly defined as one that derives most of its flow from chalk-fed groundwater, and it exhibits – in varying degrees depending on the particular geology of a given valley – the 'classic' chalk stream characteristics of alkaline, crystal-clear water, flowing consistently and equably over clean gravel beds. (Note: WWF-UK (2014) See PDF page 8, actual page 13.) (Note: See also WWF-UK website.))

The beds of the rivers are generally composed of clean, compacted gravel and flints, which provide good spawning grounds for Salmonidae fish species. Since they are primarily fed by aquifers, the flow rate, mineral content and temperature range of chalk streams shows less seasonal variation than other rivers. They are mildly alkaline and contain high levels of nitrate, phosphate, potassium and silicate. In addition to algae and diatoms, the streams provide a suitable habitat for macrophytes (including water crowfoot) and oxygen levels are generally supportive of coarse fish populations.

Of the 210 rivers classified as chalk streams globally, 160 are in England.

A list of chalk streams in England gives a total of 224. (Note: WWF-UK (2014).. .The report (Note: State of England's Chalk Rivers (2004), published by: Environment Agency; Natural England; United Kingdom Biodiversity Action Plan Steering Group) showed 161 chalk rivers in varying degrees of health.. .Since then there has been a growing view that smaller chalk streams, chalk stream headwaters and winterbournes (Note: Winterbournes are rivers that only flow when groundwater levels are high.) should also be recognised.. .224 chalk streams have been identified.. . (Note: WWF-UK (2014) See PDF page 9, actual page 14.))

== Geology and hydrology ==
Chalk is a highly porous and permeable rock, and rain falling onto chalk topography percolates directly into the ground, where the chalk layer acts as an aquifer. The groundwater flows through the chalk bedrock and reappears lower down the slope in springs. The chalk acts as a temporary reservoir by regulating the amount of water supplied to the springs. As a result, many chalk streams in the UK have stable flow regimes that vary only slightly over time. The temperature of the emerging surface water is fairly stable, rarely deviating from 10 °C (50 °F). On cold winter mornings, water vapour from the relatively warm stream condenses in the cold air above to form fog.

Chalk is slightly soluble in rainwater because rain is naturally slightly acidic. The products of chalk weathering are dissolved in rainwater and are transported in streams. Chalk streams transport little suspended material (unlike most rivers), but are considered "mineral-rich" due to the dissolved calcium and carbonate ions. The surface water of chalk streams is commonly described as "gin clear". The channel bed consists of angular flint gravel derived from the natural flint deposits found embedded within the chalk geology that contains relatively low amounts of clay and silt deposits.

The unique characteristics of chalk stream ecology are due to stable temperature and flow regimes combined with highly transparent water and lack of sand grade sediment particles.

== Ecology ==
The chalk streams have been intensively managed for many generations. In the 20th and 21st centuries, much of that management has been aimed at producing the best conditions for fly fishing, and in particular dry fly fishing. The chalk streams hold a good number of wild salmonid fish species such as the brown trout (Salmo trutta), and grayling (Thymallus thymallus). In addition to these there are also considerable numbers of stocked brown trout and stocked rainbow trout (Oncorhynchus mykiss). The rich invertebrate life and characteristically clear, shallow waters make chalk rivers and streams particularly suitable for fly fishing.

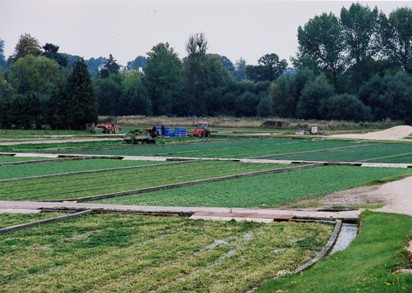
Commercial watercress production near New Alresford in Hampshire

Many of the chalk stream springs are also used as sites for watercress production, due to the constant temperature and clean, alkaline, mineral-rich spring water. (Note: Flora Britannica (Richard Mabey).. .Water-cress grown commercially in beds has the advantage.. .of growing in water drawn directly from underground springs or bore-holes.. .) The Mid Hants Watercress Railway in Hampshire is so named on account of its use for transporting watercress to London from local chalk streams. A number of the chalk aquifers and associated groundwater sources related to chalk streams and rivers are used for water abstraction by local and national water utility companies.

== Chalk stream decline ==
Excessive abstraction of chalk streams by private water companies in the UK has led to the drying up of chalk streams. This has caused ecological damage, stagnant sewage flowing through the rivers and rising phosphate levels.

== Chalk streams of England ==
=== Terminology ===
Although chalk streams are generally defined as watercourses originating in chalk hills, including winterbournes, streams, and rivers, the term chalk stream is also used for larger rivers that would normally be considered too large for the term stream. The Somme in northern France is a chalk stream on a larger scale.

Winterbournes (Note: Winterbournes are streams that only flow when groundwater levels are high.) are known by different names depending on region:

- Winterbourne – Wiltshire and Dorset. (Note: See Winterbourne (stream).)
- Nailbourne – Kent.
- Lavant – Hampshire and the west of Sussex.
- Gypsey – Yorkshire Wolds. (Note: See Gypsey (spring).)

=== Regions (England) ===
Distribution of England's chalk streams (including discharge) (Note: WWF-UK (2014) See PDF page 10, actual page 16.) (Note: WWF-UK (2014) See PDF page 10, actual page 16.)
Region	Count (Note: Number of chalk streams in region)	Discharge	Count
Eastern Wolds (Yorkshire)	35	North Sea	1
Eastern Wolds (Yorkshire)	35	Humber	34
Eastern Wolds (Lincolnshire)	19	Humber	8
Eastern Wolds (Lincolnshire)	19	North Sea	9
Eastern Wolds (Lincolnshire)	19	The Wash	2
East Anglia	58	North Sea	4
East Anglia	58	The Wash	4
East Anglia	58	The Broads	11
East Anglia	58	River Great Ouse	39
Thames	47	River Thames and Thames Estuary	41
Thames	47	English Channel	6
Wessex	64	The Solent	17
Wessex	64	Christchurch Harbour	29
Wessex	64	Poole Harbour	14
Wessex	64	English Channel	4
Isle of Wight	1	English Channel	1
Total	224		224

=== List (England) ===
==== Southern England ====
Chalk streams of the Southern England Chalk Formation in Berkshire, Hampshire, Wiltshire, Dorset, West Sussex and the Isle of Wight:

- River Avon, Hampshire and its tributaries including the
  - River Bourne
  - River Ebble
  - River Nadder
  - River Wylye
- River Ems
- River Frome
- River Itchen and its small tributaries
- River Kennet
- River Lambourn
- River Lavant
- River Loddon
- Letcombe Brook
- River Meon
- River Piddle
- River Test and its tributaries
- River Caul Bourne

Chalk streams of the Southern England Chalk Formation in the Chiltern Hills, Hampshire, Hertfordshire and Surrey (tributaries of the River Thames, River Lea and River Colne):

- River Ash
- Barton Springs
- River Beane
- River Bulbourne
- River Chess
- River Gade
- River Granta
- Hambleden Brook
- Hogsmill River
- Hughenden Stream
- River Lea
- River Mimram
- River Misbourne
- River Pang
- River Quin
- River Rib
- River Stort
- River Ver
- River Wandle
- River Wye
- River Wey

==== Yorkshire Wolds ====
Chalk streams of the Yorkshire Wolds:

- Driffield Beck, which is a tributary of the River Hull
- Gypsey Race, the most northerly chalk stream in Europe, runs east to the sea at Bridlington
- Settrington Beck, which is a tributary of the River Derwent

==== Lincolnshire ====
Chalk streams of Lincolnshire: There are several chalk streams in the Lincolnshire Wolds including

- Great Eau
- River Waring
- River Bain
- River Lymn
- River Lud,
- Laceby Beck,
- Nettleton Beck,
- Waithe Beck,

==== Kent ====
Chalk streams of Kent:

- River Dour
- Nailbourne
- River Darent
- River Stour
- (there are more in Kent than listed here)

==== Norfolk ====
Chalk streams of Norfolk:

- Babingley
- Bure
- Burn
- Gaywood
- Glaven
- Heacham
- Hun
- Ingol
- Mun
- Nar
- Stiffkey
- Tas
- Waveney
- Wensum
- Wissey
- Yare
- Weybourne Beck

==== Suffolk ====
Chalk streams of Suffolk:

- River Lark
- River Linnet

==== Hertfordshire ====
- River Ivel
- Pix brook
- River Purwell
- River Oughton
- River Hiz
- Stevenage Brook

== See also ==
- Chalk Formation
- List of rivers of England
