= Hurdcott House =

19th-century country house in Winterbourne Earls, Wiltshire, England

Coordinates: 51.1059°N 1.7584°W

Hurdcott House is a 19th-century country house in Winterbourne Earls, Wiltshire, England, in the Bourne valley about 3 miles (5 km) north-east of Salisbury. It became a Grade II listed building on 29 May 1987.

The two-storey house with three bays dates to the early-mid 19th century, and features Flemish bond brickwork with a slate roof, and a Tuscan doorcase. At the base of the rear wings of the house are four-flue brick stacks.

== Hurdcott House, Barford St Martin ==
There is another Hurdcott House in the west of Barford St Martin parish, on the banks of the River Nadder about 4 miles (6 km) west of Wilton (the house and the hamlet of Hurdcott were transferred to Barford from Baverstock parish in 1884). This house, which is not a listed building, was rebuilt in the 1970s.

The entomologist John Henry Leech had his home at Hurdcott House, and died there in 1900. He is buried in St Editha's churchyard, Baverstock.
