= Gomeldon =

Village in Wiltshire, England

Coordinates: 51.120°N 01.735°W

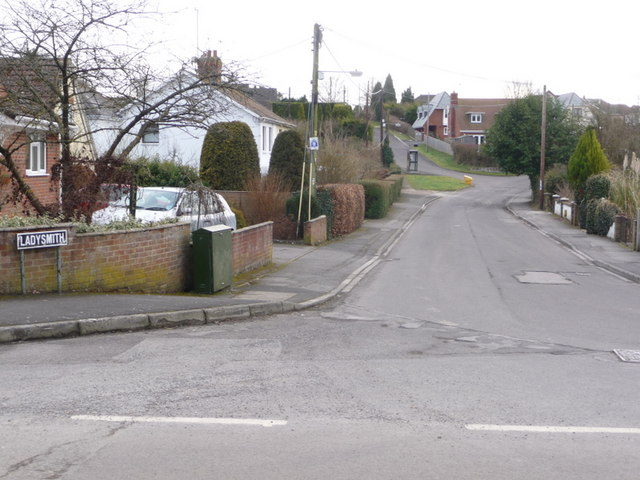
East Gomeldon, Ladysmith and telephone box

Gomeldon is a small village in the valley of the River Bourne in Wiltshire, England, in the civil parish of Idmiston. It lies about 5 miles (8 km) north-east of Salisbury, between Winterbourne Gunner and Porton, and as of 2012 its population was estimated at 200.

There is a primary school and, although there is no station, the main railway line to London passes through the village.

Gomeldon was a village in medieval times. Ten buildings on the ancient village site south-west of the school, between the modern village and the river, were excavated in the 1960s, and a report published by Salisbury Museum. The site of the deserted village is designated as a scheduled monument.

In 1821 the population was 20, and in 1831 there were 48 inhabitants. In 1868 it was a small hamlet in the parish of Idmiston.
