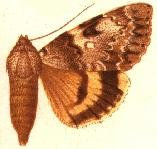

Scientific classification
- Kingdom: Animalia
- Phylum: Arthropoda
- Class: Insecta
- Order: Lepidoptera
- Superfamily: Noctuoidea
- Family: Erebidae
- Genus: Catocala
- Species: C. intacta

Binomial name
- Catocala intacta Leech, 1889

Synonyms
- Ephesia intacta

= Catocala intacta =

Species of moth

Catocala intacta is a moth of the family Erebidae. It is found in Japan and Taiwan.

The wingspan is 58–60 mm.

== Subspecies ==
- Catocala intacta intacta
- Catocala intacta taiwana Sugi, 1965 (Taiwan)
