= Catocala puella =

Scientific classification
- Domain: Eukaryota
- Kingdom: Animalia
- Phylum: Arthropoda
- Class: Insecta
- Order: Lepidoptera
- Superfamily: Noctuoidea
- Family: Erebidae
- Genus: Catocala
- Species: C. puella

Binomial name
- Catocala puella Leech, 1889

Species of moth

Catocala puella is a moth of the family Erebidae first described by John Henry Leech in 1889. It is found in northern China and Korea.

The wingspan is about 46 mm.
