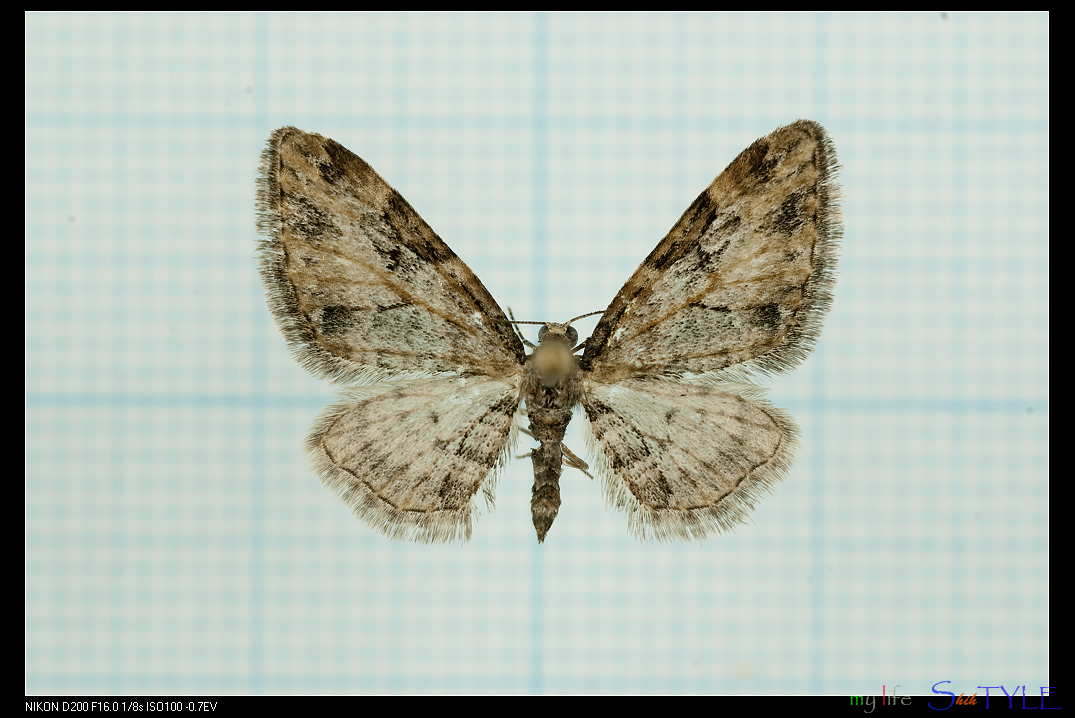

Scientific classification
- Domain: Eukaryota
- Kingdom: Animalia
- Phylum: Arthropoda
- Class: Insecta
- Order: Lepidoptera
- Family: Geometridae
- Genus: Eupithecia
- Species: E. costimacularia

Binomial name
- Eupithecia costimacularia Leech, 1897

= Eupithecia costimacularia =

Species of moth

Eupithecia costimacularia is a moth in the family Geometridae. It is found in Japan and Taiwan.
