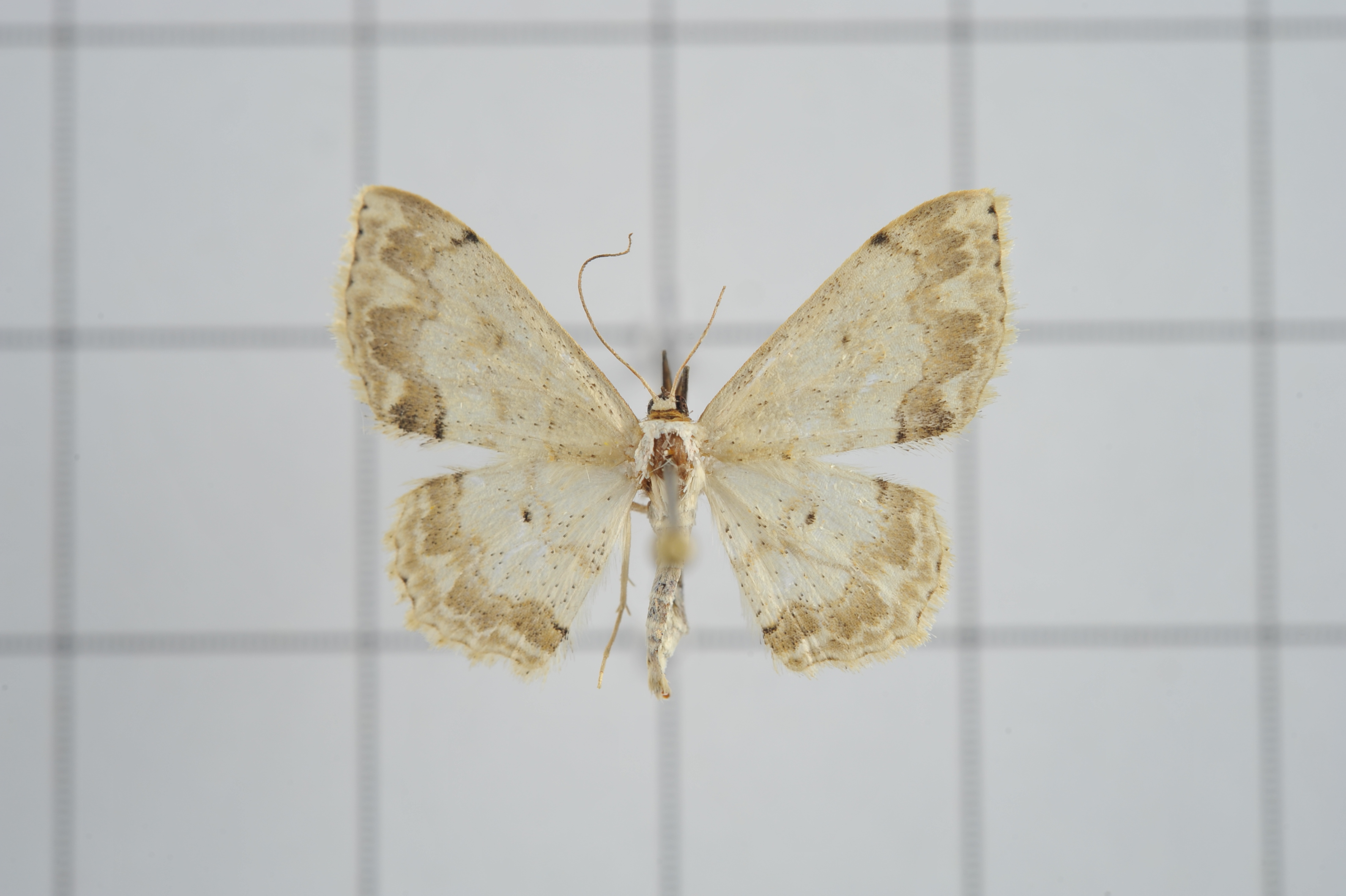

Scientific classification
- Kingdom: Animalia
- Phylum: Arthropoda
- Class: Insecta
- Order: Lepidoptera
- Family: Geometridae
- Genus: Scopula
- Species: S. propinquaria

Binomial name
- Scopula propinquaria (Leech, 1897)

Synonyms
- Acidalia propinquaria Leech, 1897

= Scopula propinquaria =

Species of geometer moth in subfamily Sterrhinae

Scopula propinquaria is a moth of the family Geometridae. It is found in China, Taiwan, Korea and Japan.
