= Catocala separans =

Scientific classification
- Domain: Eukaryota
- Kingdom: Animalia
- Phylum: Arthropoda
- Class: Insecta
- Order: Lepidoptera
- Superfamily: Noctuoidea
- Family: Erebidae
- Genus: Catocala
- Species: C. separans

Binomial name
- Catocala separans Leech, 1889

Synonyms
- Catocala hetaera Staudinger, 1892

Species of moth

Catocala separans is a moth of the family Erebidae. It is found in Russia (Primorye), Korea and Japan (Honshu, Tsushima).

The wingspan is about 57 mm.
