= Alexander Powell =

British Tory politician

Alexander Powell (9 June 1782 – 25 December 1847) was a British Tory politician, who sat as Member of Parliament for Downton from 1826 to 1830.

Powell was the son of Francis Powell and his wife Anna Maria Burrough, daughter of Sydenham Borough. He was educated at Exeter College, Oxford, matriculating on 26 May 1800 aged 17, graduating B.A. in 1804.

He served as High Sheriff of Wiltshire 1818–19 and Mayor of Wilton 1829–30.

The constituency of Downton was controlled by the Tory 2nd Earl of Radnor. In the 1826 general election, Radnor nominated Thomas Grimston Estcourt, a local squire recently elected MP for Oxford University in a by-election, and Robert Southey, the Tory poet laureate, as MPs for Downton. Neither took their seat: Estcourt continued to represent the university, while Southey, nominated without his knowledge and wishing to continue to live and write in the Lake District, declined the seat on the grounds that he did not meet the property qualification. Radnor therefore nominated his half-brother Bartholomew Bouverie and Alexander Powell, both Tories, who were returned in by-elections in December 1826. The 2nd Earl died in 1828, and was succeeded by his son the 3rd Earl of Radnor, a radical supporter of political reform. Powell offered to resign the seat, but the Earl, impressed by the offer, refused it. Powell stood down at the 1830 general election.

His residence was Hurdcott House, Baverstock, Wiltshire (not to be confused with the Hurdcott House in Winterbourne Earls).

He died on 25 December 1847, aged 65. His will was proved on 17 March 1848.

== Family ==
On 7 July 1807, Powell married Joanna Law, daughter of George Henry Law, Bishop of Bath and Wells. They had the following children:

- Alexander Pitts Elliott Powell (1809–1882), Deputy Lieutenant of Wiltshire
- Edward Powell (1816), died in infancy
- Charles Powell (1819), died in infancy
- George Francis Sydenham Powell (1820–1888), Rector of Sutton Veny
- Anne Maria Powell, married Richard Strachey
- Joanna Powell, married Rev. Thomas Garratt
- Jane Powell, married Rev. Reginald Pole
- Catherine Augusta Powell, married Rev. Charles Raikes Davy (son of General Sir William Gabriel Davy)
- Henry Lionel Powell (d. 1837), died in childhood

Parliament of the United Kingdom
Preceded by Thomas Grimston Estcourt; Robert Southey	Member of Parliament for Downton; December 1826–1830; With: Bartholomew Bouverie	Succeeded by James Brougham; Charles Shaw-Lefevre
