= John Bowle (writer) =

(1725–1788), vicar of Idmiston and English translator of Don Quixote

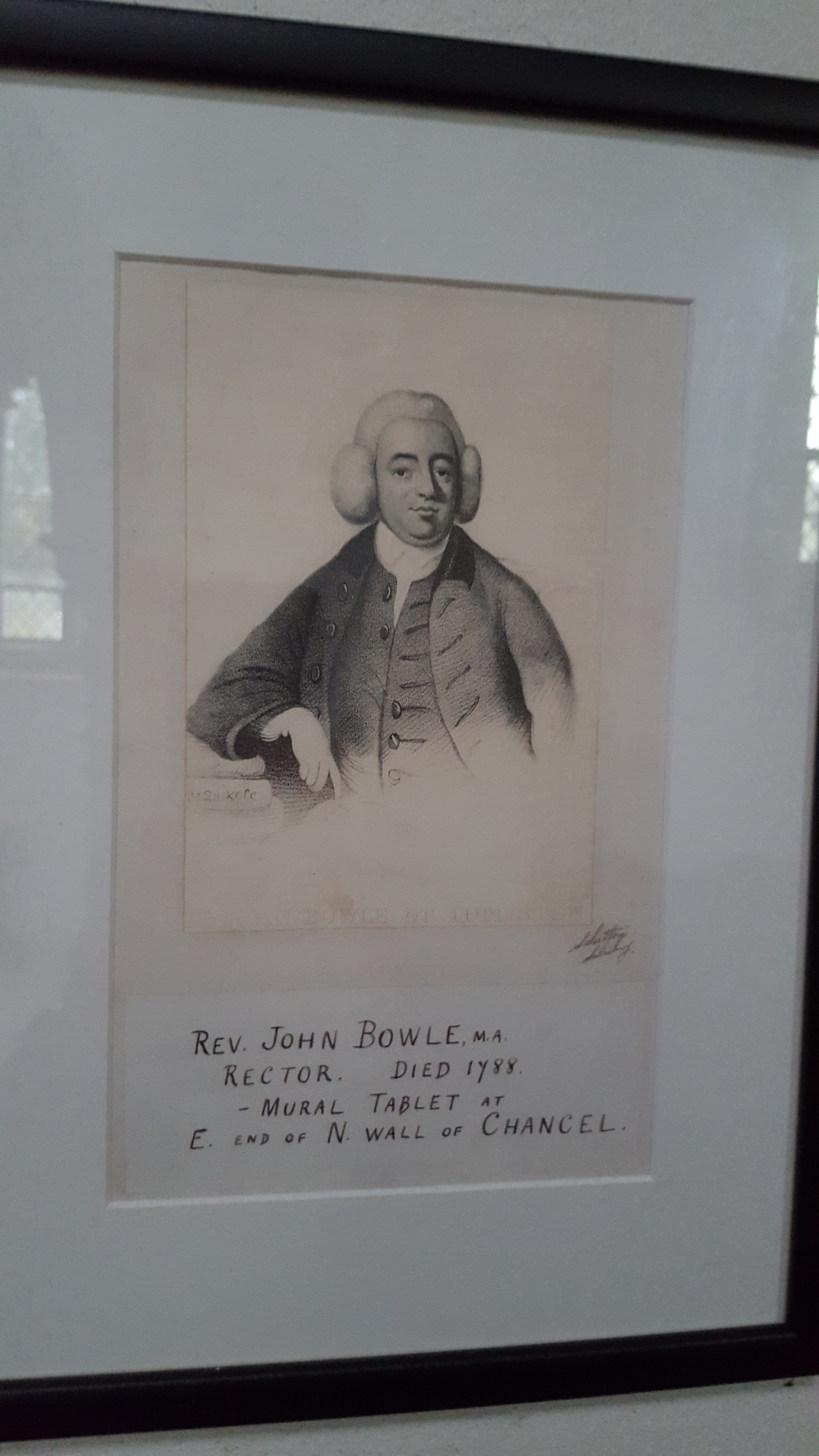
Print portraying Bowles, artist illegible, displayed in Idmiston church

John Bowle (1725–1788) was an English clergyman and scholar, known today primarily for his ground-breaking, annotated edition of the early 1600s Miguel de Cervantes novel Don Quixote. He is considered to have been the first Hispanist.

== Life ==
Bowle, called by his friends Don Bowle, was descended from Dr. John Bowle, bishop of Rochester. He was born on 26 October 1725 at Idmiston in Wiltshire, was educated at Oriel College, Oxford, and became M.A. in 1750. He was elected Fellow of the Society of Antiquaries in 1776. Having entered holy orders, he obtained the vicarage of Idmiston (spelt Idemeston in his Don Quixote), north of Salisbury in Wiltshire, where he died on 26 October 1788, his 63rd birthday. He had married Elizabeth, who had died at a younger age in 1759.

An erudite scholar who was often in London, Bowle was acquainted with French, Spanish, and Italian literature, and accumulated a large and valuable library, sold in 1790. He was a member of Samuel Johnson's Essex Head Club, and preceded John Douglas in detecting William Lauder's forgeries.

== Works ==
=== Don Quixote edition ===
In a form of advertising of the day, Bowle published in 1777 a lengthy letter to his friend, the medievalist Thomas Percy, concerning a planned new edition of the Miguel de Cervantes novel Don Quixote, to be illustrated by annotations and extracts from the historians, poets, and romances of Spain and Italy, and other writers, ancient and modern, with a glossary and indexes. He gave also an outline of the life of Cervantes in the Gentleman's Magazine, 1781, and circulated proposals to print the work by subscription. In fact the Don Quixote project had originated with Percy, and the letter tacitly assigned it to Bowle.

Bowle was the first to consider Cervantes in the novel Don Quixote as a classic author, comparable with ancient Greek and Latin writers. He gave the work a critical apparatus. Ahead of his time, he found his efforts largely unappreciated. Today, Bowle's edition is considered the first scholarly edition of the work, and it was reproduced in facsimile in 2006.

The edition appeared in 1781, in six volumes, the first four containing the text, the fifth the notes, and the sixth the indexes. (These six volumes as found in libraries today are bound into 2, 3, 4, or 6 volumes.) The whole work is written in Spanish, a language which Bowle did not master. Its reception was unfavourable, except in Spain, where it was praised by es:Juan Antonio Pellicer, among others.

In 1784 Bowle complained in The Gentleman's Magazine, in four pseudonymously-signed letters, and in 1785 he published Remarks on the Extraordinary Conduct of the Knight of the Ten Stars and his Italian Squire, to the editor of Don Quixote. In a letter to J. S., D.D. Here the "Knight" was Captain John Crookshanks or Cruickshank R.N., and the "Squire" intended Joseph Baretti. Baretti retorted in a scathing, bitter book, entitled Tolondron, Speeches to John Bowle about his Edition of Don Quixote, 1786. The criticisms were reprisals for perceived slights: Bowle had made derogatory comments about Baretti in his letter to Percy, and Crookshanks, having helped Bowle, was annoyed not to receive acknowledgement in the work. "J. S., D.D" has been tentatively identified as Joseph Simpson. One of Baretti's points was that John Talbot Dillon, a Spanish-speaker also associated with the Don Quixote project, needed recognition, while Bowle treated the language solely as written.

Volume 23, No. 2 of the journal Cervantes, published by the Cervantes Society of America (Fall, 2003) is dedicated to John Bowle. On its cover is the only known portrait of Bowle.

In 2006 Juan de la Cuesta Hispanic Monographs republished Bowle's edition for the first time since 1781, accompanied by a Preface of es:Eduardo Urbina and an Introduction by es:Daniel Eisenberg.

=== Other works ===
Bowle published in 1765 Miscellaneous Pieces of Antient English Poesie, containing Shakespeare's King John, and some of the satires of John Marston. He contributed to James Granger's History, George Steevens's edition of Shakespeare, 1778, and Thomas Warton's History of English Poetry. In Archaeologia are remarks on the old pronunciation of the French language, musical instruments mentioned in Le Roman de la Rose, parish registers, and playing cards.

== Memorials ==
Bowle, his wife and certain members of his family are commemorated by wall tablets in his church, All Saints at Idmiston.

== Works of Bowle ==
- Bowle, John; Percy, Thomas (1987). Cervantine Correspondence. Exeter Hispanic Texts. Exeter. ISBN 0859892883.
- Bowle, John (2001) [1777]. "A Letter to Dr. Percy" (PDF). Cervantes (Journal of the Cervantes Society of America). 21 (1): 95–146.
- Cervantes, Miguel de (2006) [1781]. Bowle, John (ed.). Don Quixote de la Mancha. Juan de la Cuesta Hispanic Monographs. ISBN 1588710874. Introduction by Daniel Eisenberg (in Spanish). Text of the 1781 edition.

== Further reading (most recent first) ==
- Eisenberg, Daniel (2006). "The Man who made Don Quixote a Classic: The Rev. John Bowle". Entre Cervantes y Shakespeare. Sendas del Renacimiento. Juan de la Cuesta Hispanic Monographs. ISBN 9781588711045.
- Baretti, Joseph (2003) [1786]. Eisenberg, Daniel (ed.). "Tolondron. Speeches to John Bowle about his Edition of Don Quixote, together with Some Account of Spanish Literature". Cervantes (Bulletin of the Cervantes Society of America). 23 (2): 141–274. doi:10.3138/Cervantes.23.2.141. hdl:2027/nyp.33433089911055. S2CID 190302963.
- Cox, R[alph] Merritt (1977). An English ilustrado: the Reverend John Bowle. Peter Lang.
- Cox, R[alph] Merritt (1971). The Rev. John Bowle: the genesis of Cervantean criticism. Chapel Hill, North Carolina: University of North Carolina Press.
