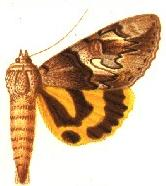

Scientific classification
- Kingdom: Animalia
- Phylum: Arthropoda
- Class: Insecta
- Order: Lepidoptera
- Superfamily: Noctuoidea
- Family: Erebidae
- Genus: Catocala
- Species: C. invasa

Binomial name
- Catocala invasa Leech, 1900

Synonyms
- Ephesia invasa

= Catocala invasa =

Species of moth

Catocala invasa is a moth of the family Erebidae first described by John Henry Leech in 1900. It is found in China.
