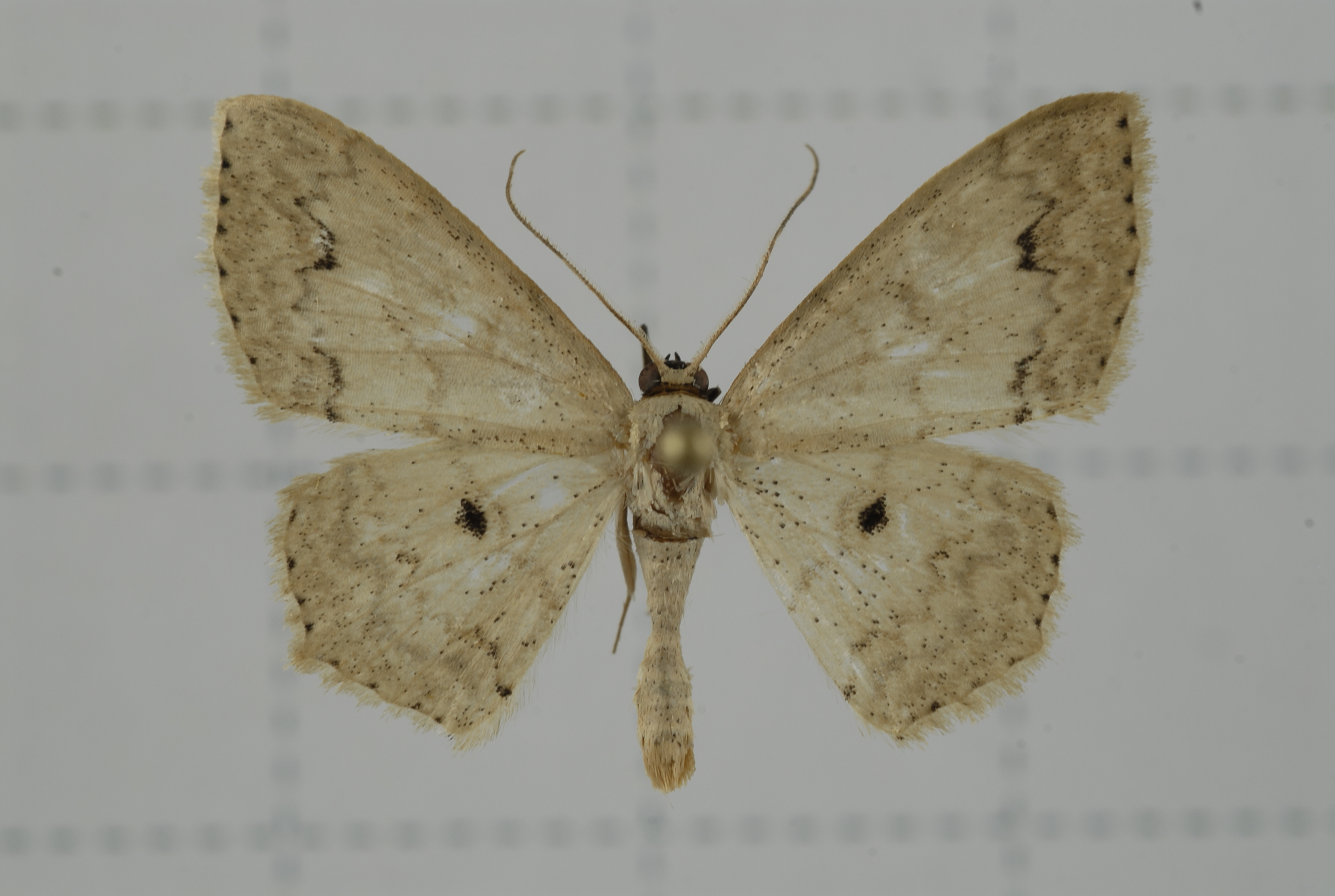

Scientific classification
- Domain: Eukaryota
- Kingdom: Animalia
- Phylum: Arthropoda
- Class: Insecta
- Order: Lepidoptera
- Family: Geometridae
- Genus: Scopula
- Species: S. proximaria

Binomial name
- Scopula proximaria (Leech, 1897)

Synonyms
- Acidalia proximaria Leech, 1897; Craspedia indigenata Wileman, 1911; Scopula proximaria ab. tetrasticta Prout, 1938

= Scopula proximaria =

Species of geometer moth in subfamily Sterrhinae

Scopula proximaria is a moth of the family Geometridae. It is found in central China and Taiwan.

== Subspecies ==
- Scopula proximaria proximaria (China)
- Scopula proximaria indigenata (Wileman, 1911) (Taiwan)
