= Idmiston =

Village in Wiltshire, England

Coordinates: 51.135°N 1.72°W

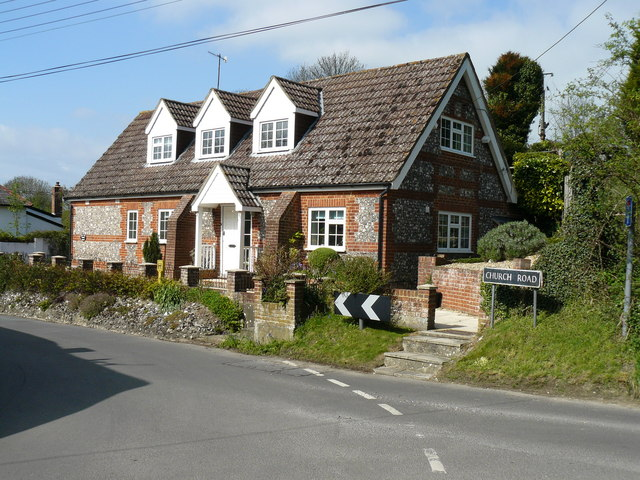
- The Old School House

- Location within Wiltshire
- Population: 2,130 (in 2011)
- OS grid reference: SU197373
- Civil parish: Idmiston
- Unitary authority: Wiltshire
- Ceremonial county: Wiltshire
- Region: South West
- Country: England
- Sovereign state: United Kingdom
- Post town: SALISBURY
- Postcode district: SP4
- Dialling code: 01980
- Police: Wiltshire
- Fire: Dorset and Wiltshire
- Ambulance: South Western
- UK Parliament: Salisbury
- Website: Parish Council

Idmiston is a village and civil parish in Wiltshire, England. The village is about 3 miles (4.8 km) southeast of Amesbury and 6 miles (10 km) northeast of Salisbury. The parish includes the villages of Porton and Gomeldon; all three villages are on the River Bourne and are linked by the A338 road.

Porton Down military science park is in the parish, separated from Idmiston by a railway line. It is home to the Defence Science and Technology Laboratory and related businesses.

== History ==
The Port Way, a Roman road towards Sorviodunum (Old Sarum), followed the Bourne valley and passed close to the present settlements.

The Domesday survey in 1086 recorded 15 households at Eunestetone (Idmiston), on land held by Glastonbury Abbey; and eight at Poertone or Portone, on land held by Edward of Salisbury and Wulfric the hunter.

Idmiston Manor is a house from c. 1600 with 17th-century interior features and an arched gateway from the same period; both house and gateway are Grade II* listed. The Old Rectory, opposite the church, also dates from the early 17th century and is also Grade II*.

A small grass-runway aerodrome was opened in 1917 on farmland at Boscombe Down in the north of the parish for the Royal Flying Corps, and continued in use until 1920. The site was reopened and enlarged to form RAF Boscombe Down in 1930, then repurposed in 1939 as an aircraft research and testing station. The first hard runway was built in 1945. Now called MoD Boscombe Down and extending into Amesbury and Allington parishes, its research and testing role continues.

== Religious sites ==
The Grade I listed All Saints Church, Idmiston was built in the 12th century as the parish church. In 1977 it was declared redundant, and St Nicholas' at Porton became the parish church; All Saints is now in the care of the Churches Conservation Trust.

In 1977, the name of the ecclesiastical parish was 'Idmiston with Porton and Gomeldon'. Today the parish of 'St Nicholas Porton and District' is within the area of the Bourne Valley benefice, a group of six rural parishes.

== Railway ==
In 1857, the London and South Western Railway company opened its line from Andover to Milford station at Salisbury, following the Bourne valley through the parish. There was a station at Porton from the beginning; between 1943 and 1968 a halt at Idmiston served Porton Down military camp. The railway remains in use as part of the West of England Main Line but there are no local stations.

== Amenities ==
There are two primary schools in the parish. St Nicholas' CofE (VA) Primary School was built in 1972 between Idmiston and Porton. Idmiston village had its own school from 1833, replaced by a new building in 1869, opposite the church; it closed after the new school was opened to cater for the increased local population. The second school is at Gomeldon, built in 1912 and later extended, then modernised in 1972.

== Notable people ==
John Bowle (1725–1788), known for his scholarly annotated edition of Don Quixote, was vicar of Idmiston for some years until his death.
