= Winterbourne Down =

Winterbourne Down can mean:

- Winterbourne Down, South Gloucestershire
- Winterbourne Down, Wiltshire, a hill overlooking Firsdown
