= Eupithecia sinicaria =

Scientific classification
- Domain: Eukaryota
- Kingdom: Animalia
- Phylum: Arthropoda
- Class: Insecta
- Order: Lepidoptera
- Family: Geometridae
- Genus: Eupithecia
- Species: E. sinicaria

Binomial name
- Eupithecia sinicaria Leech, 1897

Synonyms
- Eupithecia fulcrata L.B. Prout, 1958

Species of moth

Eupithecia sinicaria is a moth in the family Geometridae. It is found in China (Tibet, Shaanxi, Yunnan) and Myanmar.
