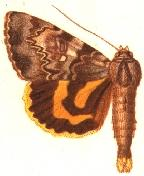

Scientific classification
- Kingdom: Animalia
- Phylum: Arthropoda
- Class: Insecta
- Order: Lepidoptera
- Superfamily: Noctuoidea
- Family: Erebidae
- Genus: Catocala
- Species: C. columbina

Binomial name
- Catocala columbina Leech, 1900

Synonyms
- Ephesia columbina; Mormonia bella splendens Mell, 1933

= Catocala columbina =

Species of moth

Catocala columbina is a moth of the family Erebidae. It is found in Sichuan, Zhejiang, Taiwan and Japan.

== Subspecies ==
- Catocala columbina columbina
- Catocala columbina okurai Sugi, 1965 (Taiwan)
- Catocala columbina yoshihikoi Ishizuka, 2002 (Japan)
