= Figsbury Ring =

Earthworks in Wiltshire, England

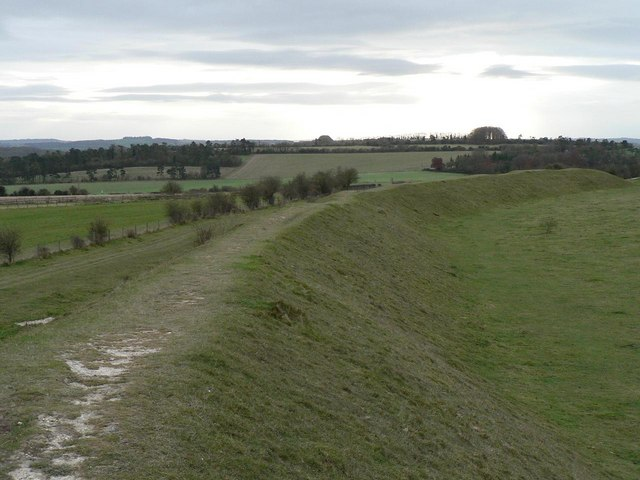

- Location within the United Kingdom
- Location: Firsdown, Wiltshire, England
- Coordinates: 51°6′11″N 1°43′51″W
- Area: 11.2 ha (28 acres)
- Established: 1975
- Governing body: National Trust
- Website: PastScape

Figsbury Ring (grid reference SU188338) is an 11.2 hectare biological Site of Special Scientific Interest in Wiltshire, England, notified in 1975. It is owned and managed by the National Trust.

== Earthworks ==
Within the wider SSSI mentioned above, the earthworks of Figsbury Ring are sub-circular and enclose 6.4 hectares of grassland on a chalk ridge in Wiltshire to the north east of Salisbury, in the parish of Firsdown, at NGR SU188338. It is yet to be fully investigated.

Small portions of the site were excavated in 1924 by Ben and Maud Cunnington, as it was their belief that the site was the remains of an Iron Age hillfort. Superficially, this description of an earthwork with exterior ditch would seem appropriate, but the presence of an enigmatic inner ditch has led many archaeologists to doubt this interpretation. This ditch is separated from the outer rampart by a berm of up to 30 metres in width and, to many, it seems likely that the site actually began as a late Neolithic henge.

A small geophysical survey was carried out by Anthony Clark and John Gater in 1981 to determine whether or not an earth bank was ever associated with the inner ditch. The results of this survey were inconclusive.

In 1982, the finds from the Cunningtons' excavations were reappraised by Margaret Guido and Isobel Smith. Several artefacts, notably grooved ware and Beaker pottery, established that there had been occupation at the site much earlier than the period proposed by the Cunningtons.

A further reappraisal of the artefacts was carried out in 2003/04 by Philip Dunn, a student at Bournemouth University. This confirmed Guido and Smith's findings and went on to identify a number of flint artefacts that were diagnostic of Neolithic occupation at the site. Following on from this study, a large-scale geophysical survey was conducted which covered 46% of the interior using a fluxgate gradiometer. The results of this survey were, again, inconclusive, although no evidence was found for the existence of an inner bank. Traces of possible structures were detected and it was proposed that the site may have particularly early origins.

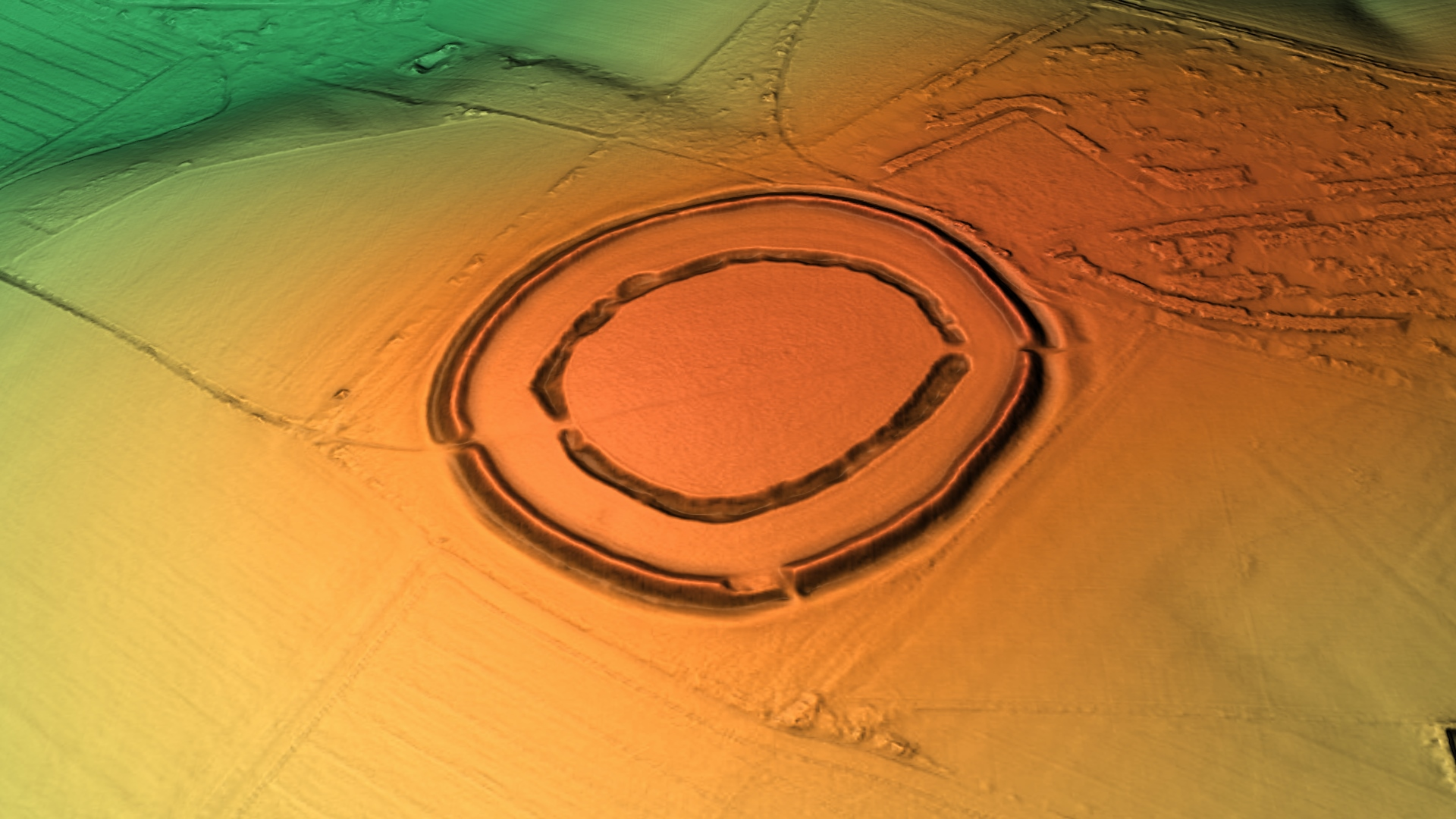
3D view of the digital terrain model

When Figsbury was considered within the context of the wider landscape and a range of other nearby monuments, it appeared possible that the site may have begun as a causewayed enclosure. This may then have been modified into a henge monument in the later Neolithic or Early Bronze Age. There is certainly sufficient evidence to state with some degree of confidence that the site was occupied (albeit temporarily or intermittently) towards the middle of the third millennium BC. Further modification of the site appears to have taken place during the late Bronze Age or early Iron Age.

== In popular culture ==
Figsbury Ring features prominently in E. M. Forster's 1907 novel, The Longest Journey, renamed the Cadbury Rings (the surrounding area is called Cadford). The narrator of the novel speculates as to whether the structure was British, Roman, Saxon, or Danish, and suggests it is a tomb concealing ancient dead soldiers and buried gold. In the novel, the area between the rings is planted with mangel-wurzels and there is a tree growing in the centre of the inner ring.
