= All Saints Church, Idmiston =

All Saints Church
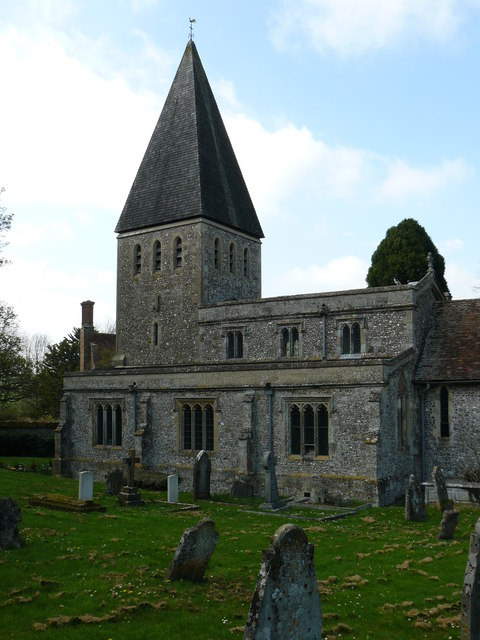

- Location within Wiltshire
- 51°08′06″N 1°43′10″W
- Location: Idmiston, Wiltshire, England

History
- Built: 12th century

Listed Building – Grade I
- Official name: Church of All Saints
- Designated: 18 February 1958
- Reference no.: 1023956

All Saints Church in Idmiston, Wiltshire, England, was built in the 12th century. It is recorded in the National Heritage List for England as a Grade I listed building and is in the care of The Churches Conservation Trust. It was declared redundant in 1977, and was vested in the trust the next year.

== Description ==
The church is built of flint with interspersed limestone. It has a west tower, nave with north and south aisles, and a chancel, and was begun in the 12th century. The only remaining structure from that century is the lower part of the tower; the later corbels of the east arch under the tower are decorated with re-used 12th-century crudely carved heads. The 13th-century chancel has lancet windows. Aisles were added in the later 13th century, and at some point they were lengthened to embrace the tower. In the 15th century the two-storey north porch was built, almost all the nave windows were changed and the clerestory added, with parapets and gargoyles.

The tower had a steeple until it was taken down in 1668, and replaced at some point by a wooden belfry.

The church was heavily restored by John Loughborough Pearson in 1865 to 1867. Part of the tower and belfry collapsed during the work, so the upper parts were rebuilt higher, with a shingled pyramid. The south door was replaced by a window, and the north wall of the chancel rebuilt. New stained glass was installed in the east and west windows.

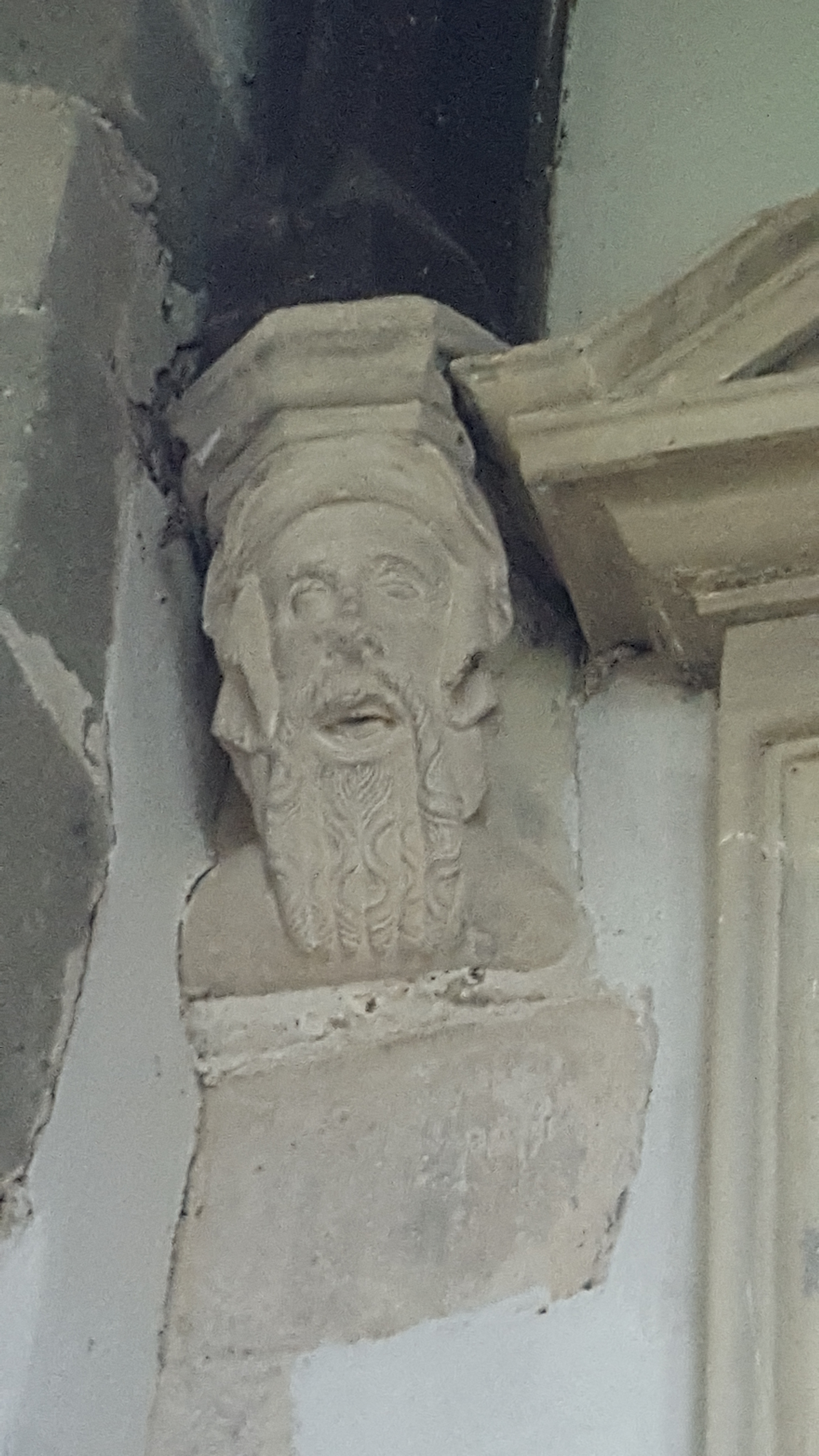
One of the carved corbels

The chancel roof is 19th-century but the low-pitched roofs to the nave and aisles are 15th-century, with carved bosses and fine carved corbels, of the Somerset type according to Pevsner.

The 13th-century octagonal font is made of Purbeck Marble. The stone pulpit and the altar rail and pews are 19th-century. The tower carries four bells, two of them from the 17th century and one from the 18th, but at present they are said to be unringable.

The tombs and memorials include a kneeling figure in a niche, for Giles Rowbach (died 1633) who was probably lord of the manor. There are also wall tablets for John Bowle (1725–1788), his wife Elizabeth and members of their family; he was the vicar of Idmiston and is known today primarily for his ground-breaking, annotated edition of the early 17th century Miguel de Cervantes novel Don Quixote. 18th-century tombs in the churchyard include two further Bowle monuments.

== Fate ==
After attendance at the church dwindled, it closed and was declared redundant, with St Nicholas' at Porton taking over the role of parish church. It was taken into care by the Redundant Churches Fund (now the Churches Conservation Trust) in September 1978.

== See also ==
- List of churches preserved by the Churches Conservation Trust in Southwest England
- List of ecclesiastical restorations and alterations by J. L. Pearson
