= Defence CBRN Centre =

United Kingdom military facility

Defence CBRN Centre Winterbourne Gunner
- Near Winterbourne Gunner, Wiltshire in England
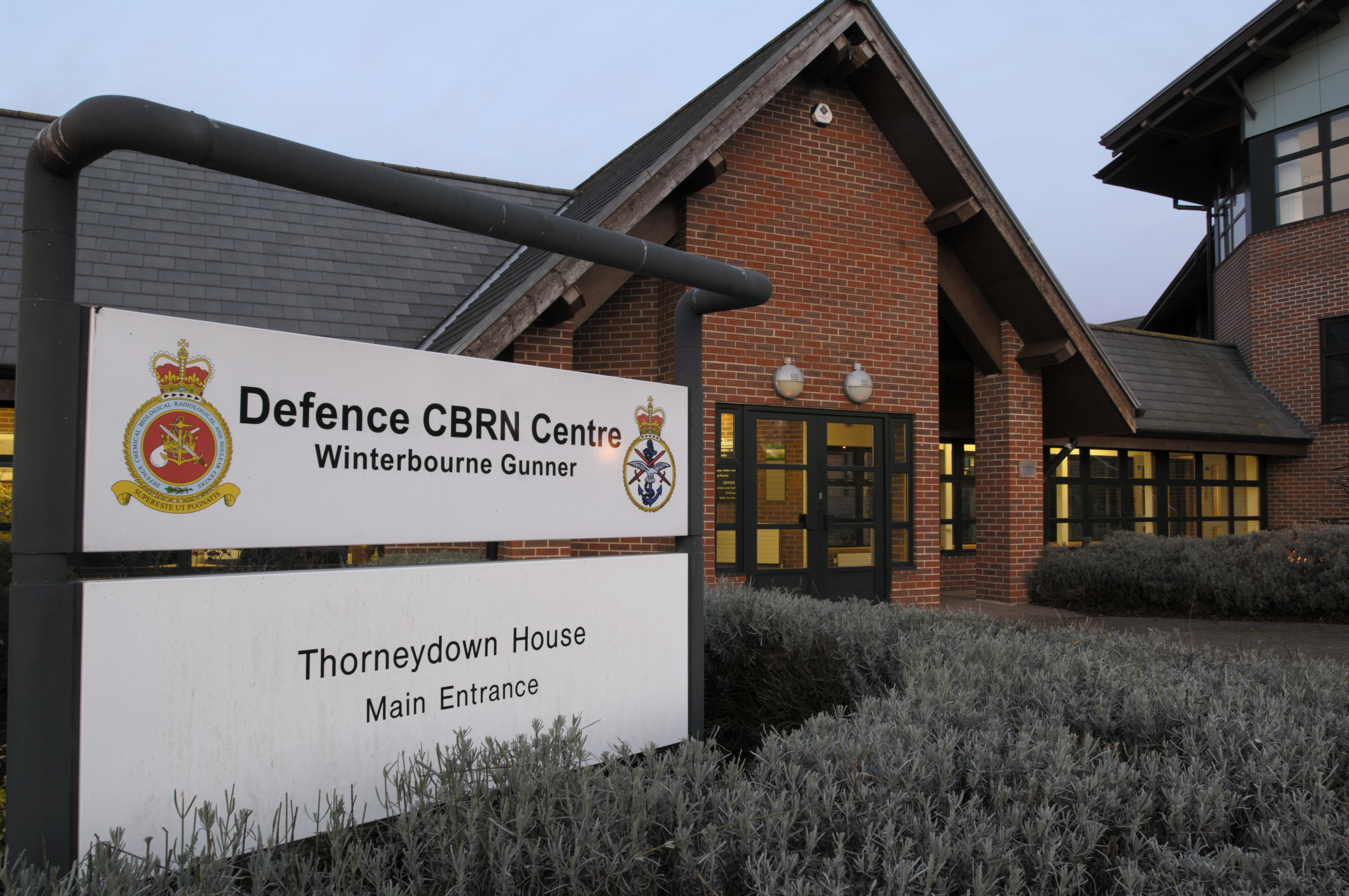
- The entrance to Thorneydown House, part of the Defence CBRN Centre.

- Supereste Ut Pugnatis (Latin for 'Fight to Live')

Site information
- Type: Military training centre
- Owner: Ministry of Defence
- Operator: British Army
- Controlled by: Royal School of Military Engineering
- Website: Defence CBRN Centre at GOV.UK

Location
- Shown within Wiltshire
- Coordinates: 51°06′43″N 001°44′16″W
- Area: 130 hectares

Site history
- Built: 1917
- In use: 1917-Present

Garrison information
- Occupants: Defence CBRN School; Defence CBRN Technical Support Group; Joint CBRN Medical Faculty

The Defence Chemical, Biological, Radiological and Nuclear Centre (the Defence CBRN Centre or DCBRNC for short) is a United Kingdom military facility at Winterbourne Gunner in Wiltshire, south of Porton Down and about 4 miles (6 km) north-east of Salisbury. It is a tri-service location, with the Army being the lead service. The centre is responsible for all training issues relating to chemical, biological, radiological and nuclear (CBRN) defence and warfare for the UK's armed forces.

It is also the home of the National Ambulance Resilience Unit's Training & Education Centre which, among other things, is responsible for training the NHS ambulance service's Hazardous Area Response Teams (HART).

== History ==
The site was established as an element of the Porton Down research facility in 1917. Known as Porton South Camp, it served as a trench mortar experimental site.

Reduced in scale immediately following the cessation of hostilities in 1918, research into chemical weapons and defence recommenced in 1921, with South Camp becoming the Chemical Warfare School in 1926. In 1931 the site became part of the Small Arms School as the Anti-Gas Wing. It would later become an independent entity, in 1939, as the Army Gas School, later the Army School of Chemical Warfare.

The site was operated by the Army until 1947, when it became a joint Army and Royal Air Force establishment. The emergence of a nuclear weapons threat led to the inclusion of radiological defence into the portfolio. In 1964 the biological threat was included in the scope of the centre and it became the Defence Nuclear, Biological and Chemical School. In 1999 the RAF took over the operation of the site, following the 1997 decision that they became the lead service for NBC training.

A full refurbishment of the site was completed in 2005, with the World War I accommodation replaced by a modernised training facility, used by all three services. Around this time the centre was the home of the Police National CBRN Centre, until it moved to NPIA facilities at Ryton, Warwickshire.

On 21 July 2005, the name of the site was changed from the Defence Nuclear Biological and Chemical Centre (DNBCC) to the Defence Chemical, Biological, Radiation and Nuclear Centre (DCBRNC).

In April 2019, the Army took over control of the centre from the RAF Regiment.

== DCBRNC courses ==
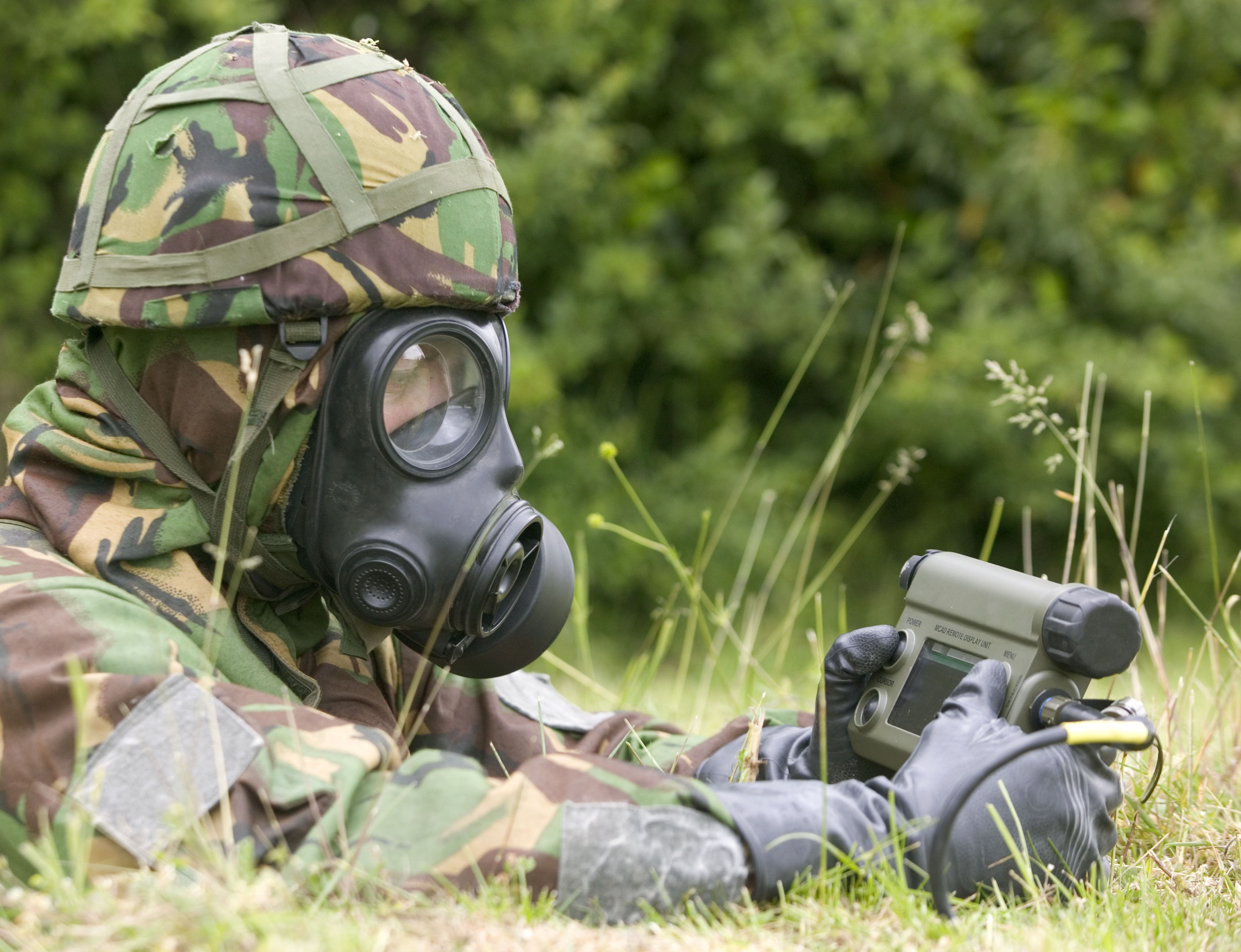
An instructor at the centre operating the Manportable Chemical Agent Detector.

The Defence CBRN (Chemical, Biological, Radiological and Nuclear) School is the instructional element of the centre. Its mission is to deliver the UK's CBRN Defence Training for Operations on land.

=== CBRN Defence Advisors' course ===
The 10-day CBRN Defence Advisors' is aimed at military officers within a battlegroup or unit who have responsibility to assist/ advice the commander in the planning and execution of CBRN measures and unit CBRN training, or who fill CBRN staff appointments. The course trains CBRN Defence Advisors operating at battlegroup or deployed at an operating base at Staff Officer level.

=== CBRN Defence Senior Officers' symposium ===
The CBRN Defence Senior Officers' Symposium has three parts: the UK's CBRN defence capabilities, the threat and countering the threat.

=== CBRN Defence Cell Controller ===
This is a course for military personnel who manage and carry out the functions of CBRN Warning & Reporting and Collection Centres in line with Allied / NATO standards. This task includes dealing with CBRN data, interpreting that information and issuing subsequent reports on the threat. The emphasis of the course is on the automated plotting of threats.

=== GSR Conversion course ===
This 5-day course trains CBRN defence instructors to fit, test and maintain the General Service Respirator and operate the Advanced Respirator Testing System.

=== CBRN Defence Trainer course ===
This course provides the knowledge and skills to conduct and deliver instruction and testing on MATT 4 / CCS. It incorporates instruction on the GSR. Individuals can apply for the course alone or together with the Defence Operational Instructor course.

=== CBRN Defence Operational Instructor course ===
This course provides the knowledge and skills to conduct unit instruction in CBRN incident response.

=== CBRN Defence Equipment Manager's course ===
This course is intended for civilian and military stores staff who are responsible for storage, maintenance and management of CBRN defence equipment.

=== CBRN Defence Casualty Decontamination Area course ===
This course trains military band personnel (who in war are stretcher bearers) to perform casualty decontamination in a CBRN environment.

== CBRN Medical ==
The Defence CBRN Centre is the home of the Joint CBRN Medical Faculty. The centre provides CBRN medical training to all medical officers in the UK Armed forces and courses are available to NATO/Allied Nations. As well as military training, Defence CBRN Centre also supports civilian response in partnership with the Health Protection Agency.

== CBRN medical centre ==
The Joint CBRN medical centre supports the medical response to a CBRN incident and the management of CBRN casualties. It is a cross-government group under the remit under the Surgeon-General to develop CBRN clinical guidance, medical training and research. The clinical training objectives are to:

"manage any CBRN casualties including trauma, manage the medical aspects of a CBRN incident, treat chemical casualties, treat biological casualties including sepsis, treat radiological casualties including nuclear.

=== CBRN Emergency Medical Treatment (Medical Officer) course ===
The Emergency Medical Treatment course is a 3-day course to provide military doctors with an awareness of the effects of CBRN agents and teach the competencies to provide Role 1 CBRN casualty management.

=== CBRN Clinical course ===
The CBRN Clinical course trains Role 1 (pre-hospital), 2 (hospital) and 3 (medical, nursing and allied health) professionals in the recognition and treatment of all casualties in a CBRN environment, through to Role 3 advanced medical care including critical care. This course supports the military competencies for emergency medicine, acute medicine, intensive care and specialist nurse training.

=== Defence Medic CBRN course ===
The Defence Medic CBRN course trains Role 1 (pre-hospital) medics in the recognition and treatment of all casualties in a CBRN environment. This course supports includes advanced first aid in the hot zone, emergency medical treatment and casualty decontamination.

== Technical Support Group ==
The DCBRNC Technical Support Group provides an external training and trials function. The TSG External Training Team provides all three services with their CBRN defence training, inspecting the training at unit level. Secondly, the Trials part of TSG helps the development of Joint Service CBRN defence equipment and procedures, supporting the CBRN Delivery Team and DES. The team has contributed to Light Role Teams, G.S.R. and the ARTS system.

The Defence CBRN Centre assists with the military's annual chemical warfare exercise, Exercise TOXIC DAGGER, which in 2018 took place on Salisbury Plain and involved over 300 military personnel, including 40 Commando Royal Marine, the RAF Regiment and the Royal Marines Band Service for casualty treatment.
