= Barford St Martin =

Village in Wiltshire, England

Coordinates: 51.082°N 1.921°W

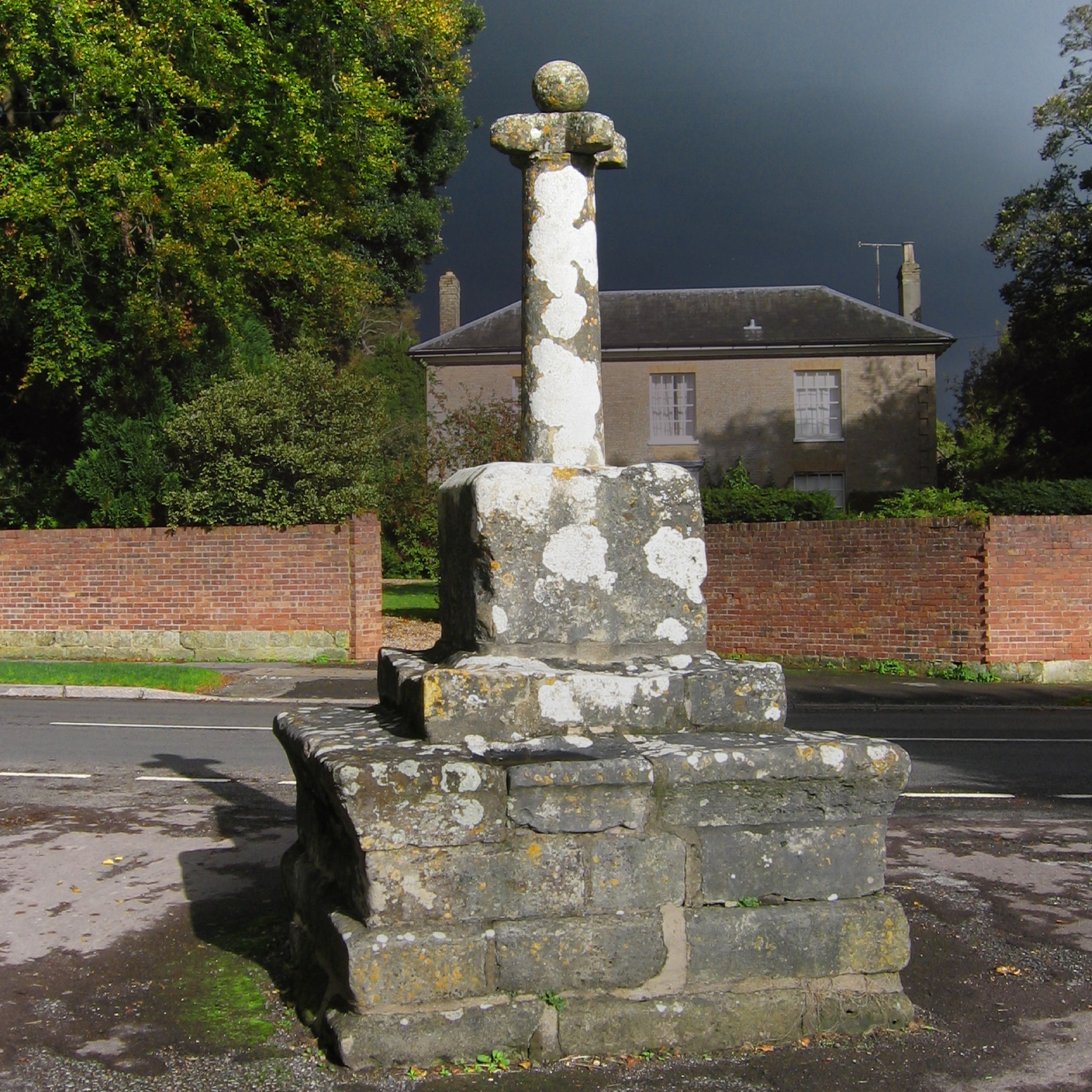
- Medieval preaching cross near St Martin's church

- Location within Wiltshire
- Population: 539 (in 2021)
- OS grid reference: SU056314
- Civil parish: Barford St Martin
- Unitary authority: Wiltshire
- Ceremonial county: Wiltshire
- Region: South West
- Country: England
- Sovereign state: United Kingdom
- Post town: Salisbury
- Postcode district: SP3
- Dialling code: 01722
- Police: Wiltshire
- Fire: Dorset and Wiltshire
- Ambulance: South Western
- UK Parliament: Salisbury
- Website: Parish Council

Barford St Martin is a village and civil parish in Wiltshire, England, about 2.5 miles (4 km) west of Wilton, around the junction of the A30 and the B3089. Barford is known as one of the Nadder Valley villages, named for the River Nadder which flows through the parish.

Grovely Wood forms the northern section of the parish.

== History ==
Prehistoric sites in the parish include the earthworks known as Ebsbury, an Iron Age settlement, field system and possible hillfort, and a Romano-British enclosed settlement, on a hilltop in the north of the parish which overlooks the Wylye valley. Grovely Ditch or Grim's Ditch, a pre-Roman earthwork, runs through Grovely Wood a little further south.

The name Barford derives from the Old English bereford meaning 'barley ford'.

A small settlement called Bereford, with nine households, was recorded in the Domesday Book compiled in 1085–1086. The St Martin suffix, from the dedication of the church, was added by 1304 to distinguish it from Barford manor in Downton parish. Amesbury Priory acquired 78 acres in 1197, and continued to hold that manor until the Dissolution in 1539.

Grovely Wood, between Barford and Great Wishford, was an extra-parochial area. By 1839, the boundary of Barford parish had moved north to include almost all of the woodland.

In 1884, the hamlet of Hurdcott – on the south side of the river upstream of Barford, with population 67 in 1891 – was transferred to Barford parish from Baverstock. Hurdcott is no longer a placename but the name lives on in Hurdcott Home Farm and Hurdcott House (not to be confused with the Hurdcott House near Winterbourne Earls).

Greensand stone for use in buildings has long been quarried near Hurdcott, and the quarry (now operated by Lovell Stone Group) is one of the few remaining sources.

== Parish church ==
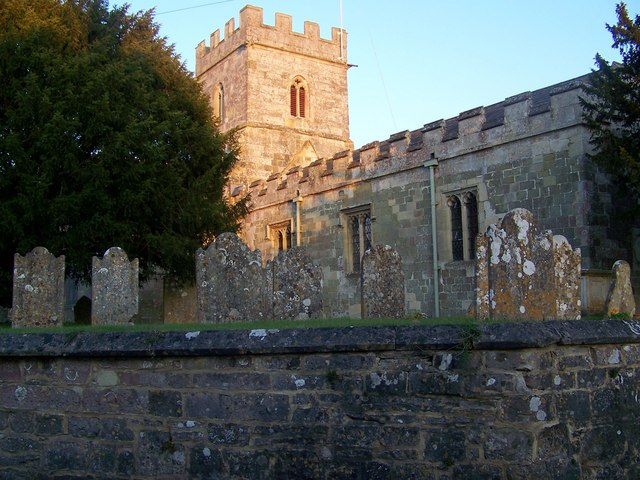
St Martin's Church

The Church of England parish church of St Martin, in the centre of the village, is a cruciform building with a crossing tower, built mostly in greensand. It stands on a man-made earth bank above the Nadder water-meadows. The 13th-century chancel is the building's oldest part, although the narrowness of the later nave implies the presence of an earlier building. The nave roof is from the 16th century, and the tower (rebuilt in the 15th) carries evidence of a steeper earlier roof. The north transept was rebuilt in 1841 to provide a vestry, and in the 20th century a vestibule was added at the west entrance. The church was designated as Grade I listed in 1960.

Inside, monuments include a monumental brass in the south transept to Alis Walker (died 1584) which depicts her with her eleven children. 17th-century woodwork in the chancel includes wainscotting, choir stalls, the altar and reredos. There are six bells: the four heaviest were cast by William Cockey in the mid-18th century, and the two lighter bells by Mears & Stainbank in 1906.

A group ministry was established for the area in 1979 and today the parish is part of the Nadder Valley benefice, alongside 14 others. At some point the parish was united with neighbouring Burcombe, whose church was declared redundant in 2005.

== Other religious sites ==
An early medieval preaching cross in the centre of the village is Grade I listed, although only the base and parts of the shaft remain.

A Primitive Methodist chapel was built in 1902 to replace an earlier chapel. By 2012 it was in residential use.

== Notable buildings ==
Besides the Grade I listed church and village cross, one building is listed at Grade II*: Little Orchard, on Short Lane, which began as a four-bay timber-framed hall house in the 15th century, and was altered in the 16th and 17th centuries. Other buildings noted by Pevsner, Cherry and Orbach include the Manor House, across the road from the church, early 19th-century in yellow brick; the former school, West Street, 1853–4; Barford House, Mount Lane, mid 18th-century in pebble-dashed brick; and the Old Rectory, Groveley Road, with one 15th-century wing.

Outside the village, a country house was built at Hurdcott in the 1630s, and in the next century the estate came into the Powell family whose descendants included Alexander Powell (1782–1847), MP for Downton. The house was reconstructed in the 1970s.

== Local government ==
Barford elects a parish council. The parish is in the area of Wiltshire Council unitary authority, which is responsible for all significant local government functions.

== Countryside Unit at Dairy Lane ==
The Countryside Unit at Dairy Lane is owned by Alabaré Christian Care Centres. The land used to be part of a farm, but now serves as a teaching facility for homeless and other disadvantaged people including those suffering and recovering from mental health illnesses. Skills such as woodworking, arts & crafts, and agriculture are taught there.

== Amenities ==
The village school with its "Feed my lambs" logo was built in 1854 and closed at the end of 2006. Village children now travel to Wilton, where the primary school was renamed 'Wilton and Barford' after the 2006 change; in 2018 its name reverted to Wilton CE Primary School. The Barford building is now used by a pre-school playgroup.

There is also a 17th-century pub called The Barford Inn, formerly known as The Green Dragon. The Wiltshire Yeomanry dedicated a tank to this pub during the Second World War, with "The Green Dragon" on one side and "Barford St Martin" on the other.

== Notable people ==
Organist and composer Caleb Simper (1856–1942) was born in Barford St Martin. Rupert Gould (1890–1948, Royal Navy officer and horologist) lived at Barford in later life.
