= Winterborne =

Winterborne may refer to:

- River Winterborne, a river in Dorset, England
- Winterborne Came, Dorset, England
- Winterborne Clenston, Dorset
- Winterborne Farringdon, Dorset
- Winterborne Herringston, Dorset
- Winterborne Houghton, Dorset
- Winterborne Kingston, Dorset
- Winterborne Monkton, Dorset
- Winterborne Muston, Dorset
- Winterborne St Martin, Dorset
- Winterborne Stickland, Dorset
- Winterborne Tomson, Dorset
- Winterborne Whitechurch, Dorset
- Winterborne Zelston, Dorset

== See also ==
- Winterbourne (disambiguation)
- Winterborn (disambiguation)
