= Porton Down SSSI =

Chalk grassland near Porton Down, England

Coordinates: 51.131°N 1.669°W

Porton Down
- Site of Special Scientific Interest
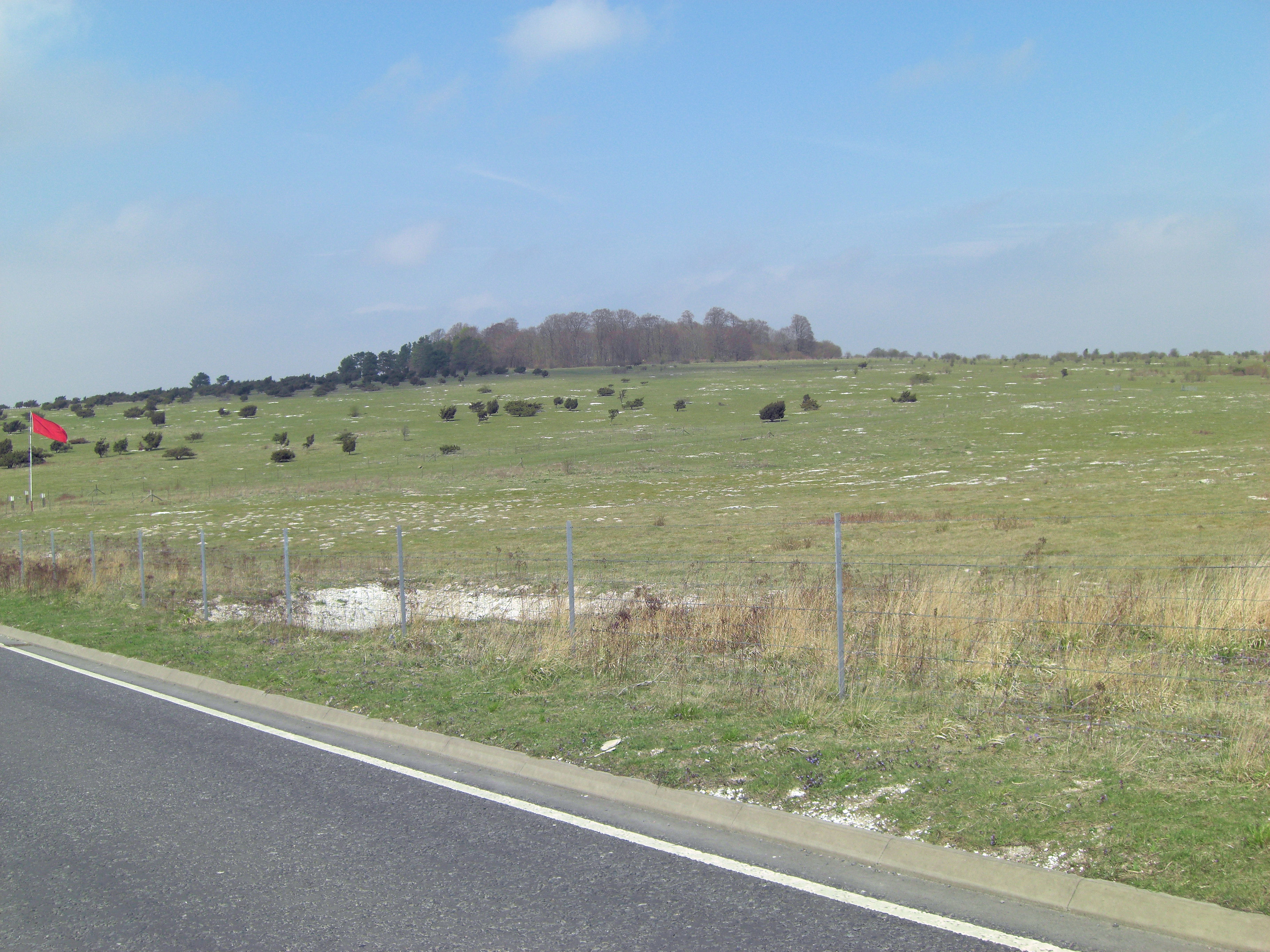
- Location of Porton Down.
- Area of search: Hampshire; Wiltshire
- Grid reference: SU 233 369
- Interest: Biological
- Area: 1,559.0 hectares (3,852 acres)
- Notification date: 1992
- Location map: Magic Map

Porton Down SSSI is a 1,559-hectare (3,850-acre) biological Site of Special Scientific Interest which spans the border between Hampshire and Wiltshire in England. It is adjacent to Porton Down science park near Porton, and much of it is Ministry of Defence property which is closed to the public. It is a Nature Conservation Review site, Grade I, a Special Area of Conservation and a Special Protection Area.

This is one of the largest areas of semi-natural chalk grassland in the country. It has also been designated an SSSI because of its important populations of lichens, vascular plants and invertebrates, and for its breeding stone curlews. There are also areas of scrub and woodland.
