= Stevenage Brook =

Tributary of the River Beane

Coordinates: 51°51′59″N 0°07′45″W

Stevenage Brook is a chalk stream and has a length of 7.544 km (4.688 mi) with a catchment area of 38.89 km^{2} (15.02 sq mi). Its headwaters is next to the A602 in Stevenage it is a tributary of the River Beane.

== Course ==
Stevenage Brook rises next to the A602 road in Stevenage, flowing through the Stevenage Golf Course, a tributary joins the Stevenage Brook, which is Aston End Brook, and then it later joins the River Beane near Watton at Stone. It has a total length of 7.544 km (4.688 mi) and a catchment area of 38.89 km^{2} (15.02 sq mi). Stevenage Brook is one out of the twenty-three bodies in the Lee Upper Operational Catchment.

== Hydrology ==
The river level data of Stevenage Brook is listed on the table below.

Stevenage Brook Water Levels
Measuring Station	Deepest Level Recorded	Date of Deepest Level	Normal Depth Range
Bragbury Park	1.19 m (119 cm)	17 July 2025	0.05 m (5.0 cm) to 0.80 m (80 cm)

The station at Bragbury Park is a flat V-weir at a width of 2.75 m (9 ft 0 in) and it was constructed in 1974.

== Water quality ==
The Environment Agency measures the water quality of the river systems in England. Each is given an overall ecological status, which may be one of five levels: high, good, moderate, poor and bad. There are several components that are used to determine this, including biological status, which looks at the quantity and varieties of invertebrates, angiosperms and fish.

The water quality of the Stevenage Brook system was as follows in 2022.

Water body	Water body type	Ecological Status	Biological quality elements	Catchment Area	Length	Hydromorphological Designation
Stevenage Brook	River	Poor	Poor	38.89 km^{2} (15.02 sq mi)	7.544 km (4.688 mi)	Not designated as artificial or heavily modified.

== Ecology ==
Stevenage Brook is a chalk stream and contains habitats such as a marsh, which is present in Stevenage Brook Marsh and it is managed by the Environment Agency. Wet grassland and a developing swamp is present in the Stevenage Brook Marsh.

In 2022, the Environment Agency gave data to the Stevenage Brook designating the water body with a ‘poor’ ecological status and ‘poor’ biological quality elements.

Several invasive species on the brook include: Giant Hogweed, Himalayan balsam and Canadian goldenrod they are present on the Stevenage Brook.
