= Baverstock Juniper Bank =

Conservation site in Wiltshire, England

Coordinates: 51.10169°N 1.95139°W

Baverstock Juniper Bank (grid reference SU035336) is a 2.6 hectare Biological Site of Special Scientific Interest to the north of the village of Baverstock in Wiltshire, England. Baverstock Juniper Bank is within the Cranborne Chase and West Wiltshire Downs Area of Outstanding Natural Beauty. The ungrazed chalk grassland is home to over 500 bushes of the lowland juniper, Juniperus communis, subspecies communis. Their seeds attract flocks of finches and yellowhammers to the location as a feeding site in winter. Uncommon species such a horseshoe vetch (Hippocrepis comosa) and pyramidal orchid are to be found at the SSSI. Butterflies such as the brimstone, speckled wood and small heath have been seen visiting the site.

The site was notified in 1971.

== Sources ==
- Natural England citation sheet for the site (accessed 21 March 2022)
