= Winterborn =

Winterborn may refer to:

- Winterborn, Rhineland-Palatinate, a municipality in the Donnersbergkreis district, in Rhineland-Palatinate, Germany
- Winterborn (band), a Finnish band
- Winterborn (album), 2013
- Winterborn (film), a 1978 Danish film
- "Winter Born (This Sacrifice)", a song by The Crüxshadows from the album Ethernaut

== See also ==
- Winterborne (disambiguation)
