= Gypsey (spring) =

A gypsey is a name given to intermittent springs and streams in the Yorkshire Wolds, England. Gypseys are streams formed from springs from the waterladen chalk that constitutes the Yorkshire Wolds. The springs flow in late winter or early spring, with the water emanating through unbroken turf. The name is thought to be derived from the Old French eaux gypsées, meaning water containing gypsum or petrifying waters.

In Wiltshire and Dorset the same phenonemon is known as a winterbourne, in Kent as a nailbourne, and as a lavant in Hampshire.

== See also ==
- Gypsey Race, named stream in the north of the Yorkshire Wolds
- Chalk stream
