= Idmiston Halt railway station =

Disused railway station in Idmiston, Wiltshire

Idmiston Halt

General information
- Location: Idmiston, Wiltshire; England
- Coordinates: 51.1327°N 1.715°W
- Grid reference: SU200730
- Platforms: 2

Other information
- Status: Disused

History
- Original company: Southern Railway

Key dates
- 3 January 1943: Opened
- 9 September 1968: Closed
Location

Idmiston Halt railway station served Porton Down military camp in Idmiston, Wiltshire, England, from 1943 to 1968 on the West of England line.

== History ==
The station was opened on 3 January 1943 by the Southern Railway. It closed on 9 September 1968. The station had two platforms and a photograph taken in the early 1960s shows a building, seemingly constructed of breeze blocks, at the London end of the Down (westbound) platform that may have served as a booking office and a separate waiting room; a man in railway porter's uniform is standing outside.

Preceding station	Disused railways	Following station
Grateley; Line and station open	Southern Railway; West of England line	Porton; Line open, station closed
