= Matthew Nicholas =

English priest (1594–1661)

Matthew Nicholas (1594–1661) was an English Dean of St. Paul's Cathedral, London.

== Life ==
He was a younger brother of Sir Edward Nicholas, born on 26 September 1594. He was elected scholar of Winchester College in 1607. He matriculated as scholar of New College, Oxford, on 18 February 1614, graduated B.C.L. on 30 June 1620, and D.C.L. on 30 June 1627.

He became rector of West Dean, Wiltshire, in 1621; of Broughton, Hampshire, in 1629; master of St. Nicholas hospital, Harnham, Salisbury, in 1630; prebendal rector of Wherwell, Hampshire, in 1637; vicar of Olveston, Gloucestershire, canon of Salisbury Cathedral and Dean of Bristol in 1639.

He was made canon of Westminster in 1642, but was deprived after the outbreak of the First Civil War; and canon and dean of St. Paul's in 1660. He died on 15 August 1661, and was buried at Winterbourne Earls, Wiltshire.

== Family ==
He married in February 1627 Elizabeth, daughter of William Fookes. He was survived by two daughters and three sons (George, Edward and John) from the marriage; one of the daughters, Elizabeth, married William Calley, and then as a widow in 1672 married Thomas Willis.

== Sources ==
- "Nicholas, Edward" . Dictionary of National Biography. London: Smith, Elder & Co. 1885–1900.

== Notes ==
Attribution

This article incorporates text from a publication now in the public domain: "Nicholas, Edward". Dictionary of National Biography. London: Smith, Elder & Co. 1885–1900.
