= Winterbourne Dauntsey =

Village in Wiltshire, England

Coordinates: 51.113°N 1.750°W

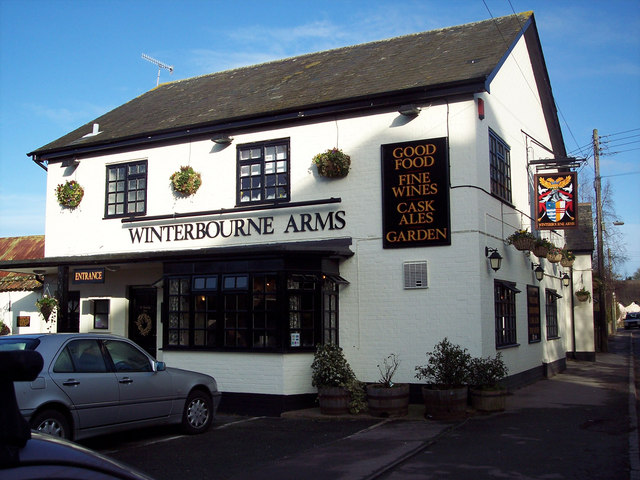
- Winterbourne Arms, Winterbourne Dauntsey

- Location within Wiltshire
- Population: 500 (est. in 2011)
- Civil parish: Winterbourne
- Unitary authority: Wiltshire
- Ceremonial county: Wiltshire
- Region: South West
- Country: England
- Sovereign state: United Kingdom
- Post town: Salisbury
- Postcode district: SP4
- Dialling code: 01980
- Police: Wiltshire
- Fire: Dorset and Wiltshire
- Ambulance: South Western
- UK Parliament: Salisbury
- Website: The Winterbournes

Winterbourne Dauntsey is a village in Wiltshire, England, in the Bourne valley on the A338 road about 3.5 miles (6 km) northeast of Salisbury.

In 1931 the parish had a population of 176. The village adjoins Winterbourne Earls and Winterbourne Gunner. It is part of the civil parish of Winterbourne, formed on 1 April 1934 by amalgamating the three ancient parishes. The name Winterbourne comes from the River Bourne, which flows through all three villages in winter and tends to dry up in summer, while Dauntsey comes from Roger Danteseye, who was the lord of the manor in 1242.

== Churches ==
A Methodist chapel was built in the late 18th century, and continues in use as Bourne Valley Methodist Church.

The local Church of England parish church is St Michael and All Angels at Winterbourne Earls, built following the 1867 demolition of St Edward's (consecrated in 1326) at Winterbourne Dauntsey.

== Notable buildings ==
The Manor House, constructed around 1720 on the main road through the village, is built of Flemish bond brickwork with a tiled roof. It has two storeys, attics and basement. The front has seven bays with a central doorway approached by eight steps, and there are back-swept wings at either end of the building, making a semi-enclosed courtyard to rear. The interior has a central hall with arched stair, and panelled dining and drawing rooms on either side. Some of the bedrooms are also panelled. The house is Grade II* listed, and the roadside brick walls and iron gates (of similar date) and a timber-framed former granary (18th century or early 19th) are also listed.

Peacock Cottages, two thatched cottages built in the 15th century as one house, are also Grade II* listed.

== Facilities ==
The village has a pub, the Winterbourne Arms. The local school, for children up to the age of 11, is Winterbourne Earls CofE Primary School.

The Monarch's Way long-distance footpath passes through the village.
