= Juan de la Cuesta Hispanic Monographs =

North American publishing house

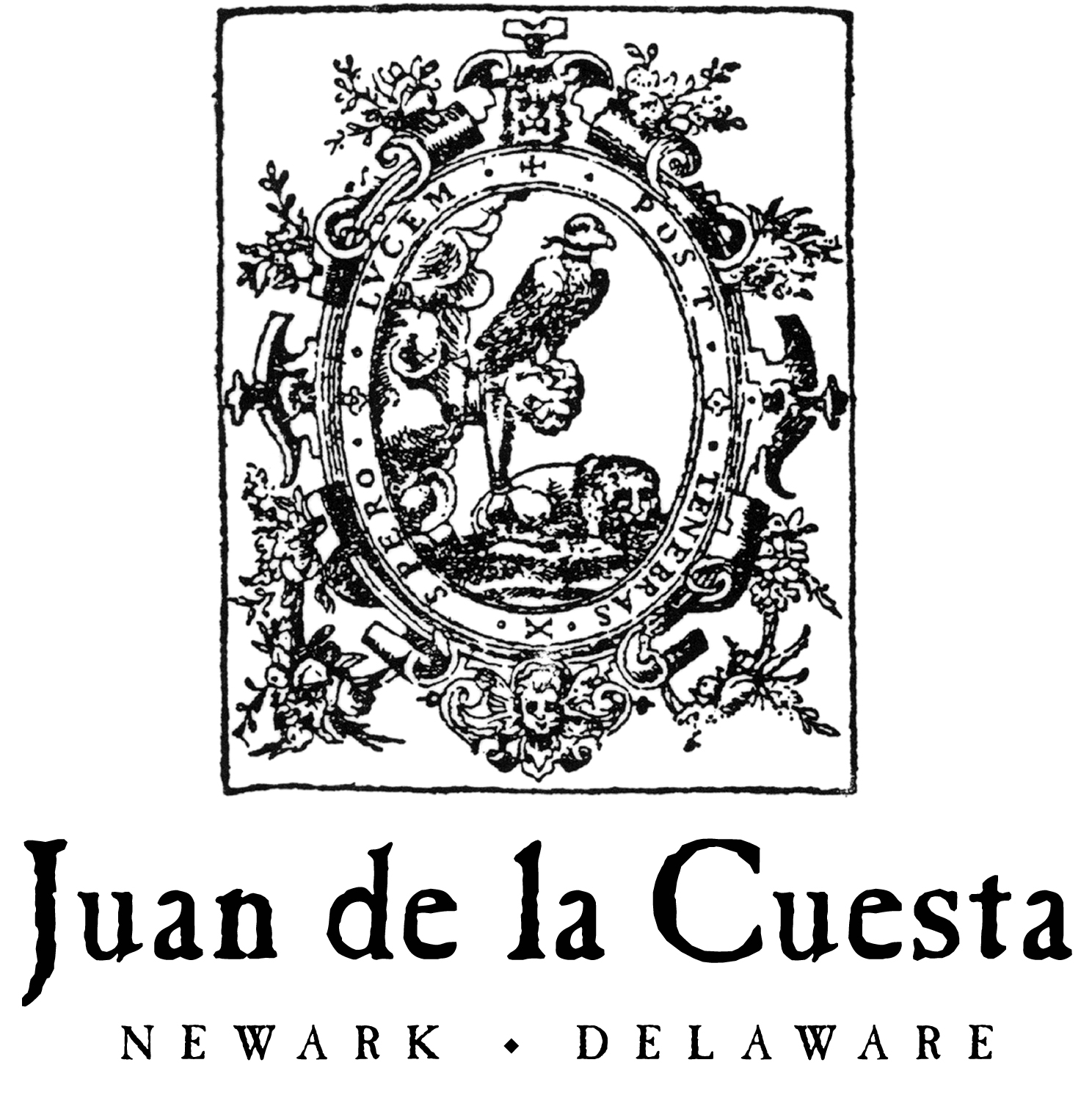
- The title page image and cover device for Juan de la Cuesta Hispanic Monographs
- Parent company: Linguatext, LLC
- Founded: 1978
- Founder: Thomas Albert Lathrop
- Country of origin: United States
- Headquarters location: Newark, Delaware
- Key people: Michael P. Bolan, Publisher Michael J. McGrath, General Editor
- Nonfiction topics: Spanish and Latin American literary criticism, Linguistics, Critical editions, Critical translations
- Official website: juandelacuesta.com

Juan de la Cuesta Hispanic Monographs (Cuesta) is a North American publishing house located in Newark, Delaware. Established in 1978 by Tom Lathrop, Cuesta has published over 400 books dealing with Spanish linguistics and Spanish and Latin American literature from medieval to modern times with a focus on the Spanish Golden Age.

== History ==
Thomas Albert Lathrop founded Cuesta in 1978 in order to provide a publishing outlet for manuscripts dealing with Spanish literary criticism, linguistics, and critical editions of classic literature. Lathrop named the publishing house after Juan de la Cuesta, the Madrid-based printer who most notably printed the first editions of Cervantes's Don Quijote (1605 and 1615). The depiction from the title page of the 1605 printing of Don Quijote of the hooded falcon and water spaniel encircled by the Latin motto "POST TENEBRAS SPERO LUCEM" ("After darkness I hope for light") was adopted by Lathrop as the logo for Cuesta.

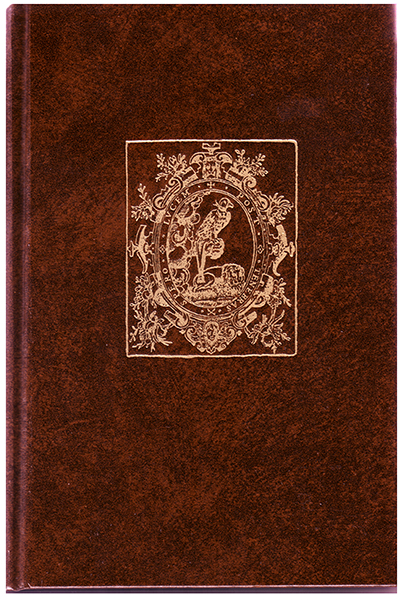
Cover, "Cervantes and the Renaissance," edited by Michael McGaha, published by Juan de la Cuesta Hispanic Monographs in 1978. This cover design (brown leatherette cloth with a gold foil stamp of the image from the title page of the original 1605 printing of "Don Quijote") was designed by Tom Lathrop and used as the standard hard cover for all monographs published by Cuesta in the 20th century.

The first book published by Juan de la Cuesta Hispanic Monographs was a collection of fourteen papers presented at the Pomona College Symposium on Cervantes in 1978, called "Cervantes and the Renaissance," edited by Michael McGaha, reviewed in the South Atlantic Review 1982.

== Series ==
Within the monographs, aside from the more general works, specialty areas include:

- Documentacíon cervantina ‹‹Tom Lathrop››: Literary criticism dealing with the works of Cervantes.
- Estudios lingüisticos: Linguistic studies.
- Ediciones críticas: Critical editions of important Spanish and Latin American works.
- Homenajes: Festschrifts in honor of prominent Hispanists.
- Estudios de literatura latinoamericana ‹‹Irving A. Leonard››: Literary criticism dealing with Latin American literature.
- Estudios de literatura medieval ‹‹John E. Keller››: Studies dealing with Medieval Spanish Literature.
- Estudios judeoespañoles ‹‹Samuel G. Armistead y Joseph H. Silverman››: Studies dealing with Judeo-Spanish Literature.
- Estudios de la literature moderna «Russell P. Sebold»: Literary criticism dealing with Modern Spanish Literature.
- Serie de traducciones críticas: Critical translations of classic Hispanic literature.
- UCLA Center for 17th- and 18th-Century Studies: The Comedia in Translation and Performance
- UC Santa Barbara: Catalan Studies

== Awards ==
Numerous Cuesta titles have won literary awards, including:

- "Making Sense of the Senses: Current Approaches in Spanish Comedia Criticism," edited by Yolanda Gamboa and Bonnie Gasior won the Vern Williamsen Comedia Book Prize, awarded once every three years from the AHCT (2020).
- "Upon the Death of Don Quijote," the first English translation of "Al morir don Quijote" by Andrés Trapiello, translated by Veronica Dean-Thacker won the Fundación José Manuel Lara Award to the Best Book of the Year according to Spanish publishers in 2005, translation published by Cuesta in 2020.
- "The Sanz Sueltas: A Descriptive, Analytical Catalogue," by Karl C. Gregg won the Premio Nacional de Bibliografía de la Biblioteca Nacional de España in 2004, published by Cuesta in 2012.

== Editorial board ==
- Vincent Barletta Stanford University
- Annette Grant Cash Georgia State University
- Gwen KirkpatrickGeorgetown University
- Mark P. Del Mastro College of Charleston
- Juan F. Egea University of Wisconsin-Madison
- Sarah L. Lehman Fordham University
- Mariselle Meléndez University of Illinois at Urbana-Champaign
- Eyda Merediz University of Maryland
- Dayle Seidenspinner-Núñez University of Notre Dame
- Elzbieta Sklodowska Washington University in St. Louis
- Noël ValisYale University
