= River Bourne, Wiltshire =

River in Wiltshire, England

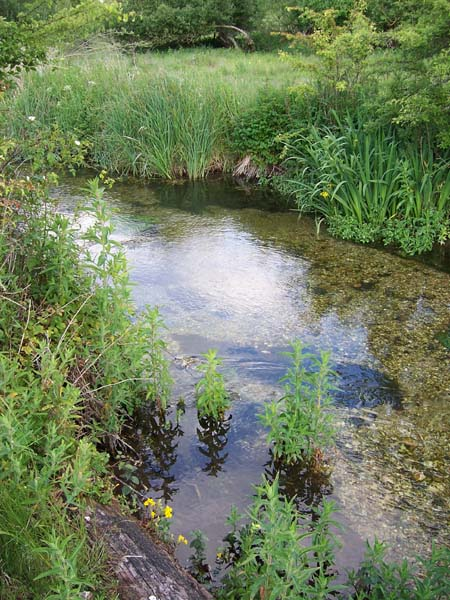
- The River at Winterbourne Gunner

Location
- Country: United Kingdom
- Region: Wiltshire

Physical characteristics
- Source
  - coordinates: 51°21′09″N 1°40′17″W
- Mouth
  - location: Salisbury
  - coordinates: 51°03′44″N 1°47′22″W
- Length: 48km

The River Bourne is a river in the English county of Wiltshire, a tributary of the Salisbury Avon. It flows in a generally southerly direction for about 48 km (30 miles). In its upper reaches the river is a winterbourne, often dry in summer.

The Bourne's source is at the eastern end of the Vale of Pewsey, just south of the village of Burbage. The river cuts through the chalk escarpment at Collingbourne Kingston, to flow south across Salisbury Plain through the town of Tidworth and the village of Shipton Bellinger.

As it continues south, the river passes the Bourne Valley villages: Cholderton, Newton Tony, Allington, Boscombe, Idmiston, Porton, Gomeldon, Winterbourne Gunner, Winterbourne Dauntsey, Winterbourne Earls and Hurdcott. After passing Ford and Laverstock, the Bourne joins the Avon in the eastern outskirts of Salisbury.

== See also ==
- List of rivers of England
