= Settrington Beck =

Beck in North Yorkshire, England

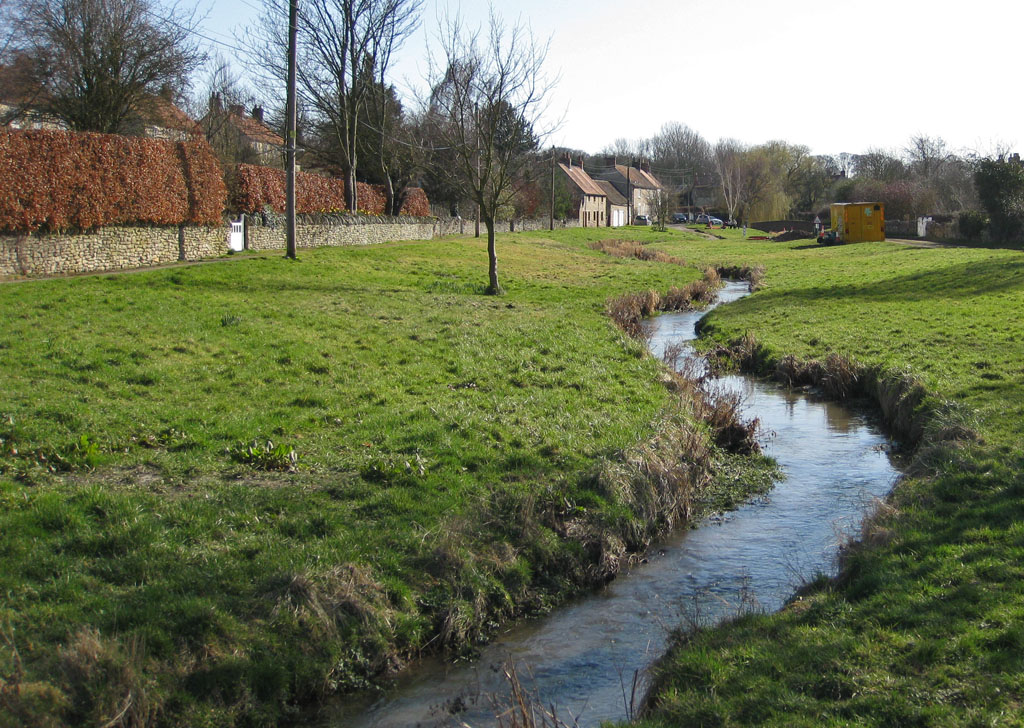
- The beck in Settrington village

- Location within North Yorkshire

Location
- County: North Yorkshire
- Country: England

Physical characteristics
- Source
  - coordinates: 54.1033°N 0.6825°W
  - elevation: 160 metres (520 ft)
- Mouth
  - coordinates: 54.1525°N 0.7469°W
- Length: 11.2 kilometres (7 mi)
- Basin size: 32.4 square kilometres (12.5 sq mi)

Basin features
- EA waterbody ID: GB104027067750

Settrington Beck is a watercourse that is a tributary of the River Derwent in North Yorkshire, (Note: Historically, the area was in the East Riding of Yorkshire, but moved in 1974 into North Yorkshire.) England. The beck rises on the northern part of the Yorkshire Wolds and is a chalk stream that flows northwards through the village of Settrington, for which it is named after. The beck is one of 34 chalk streams in the eastern part of Yorkshire that flow into the Humber Estuary. As a chalk stream, the beck is protected by the Environment Agency for its rate of flow, with abstraction licences being reduced in amount that can be taken over other non-chalk watercourses.

== History ==
The beck is a tributary of the River Derwent, and has cut through the Ferriby Chalk formation which has revealed Jurassic clays underneath the surface chalk strata. The beck rises south-east of Settrington as Whitestone Beck at around 160 metres (520 ft) above sea level, runs west to North Grimston, then turns northwards and bisects the village of Settrington, running down the middle of two sets of parallel houses, at around 35 metres (115 ft) above sea level. From its source to Settrington, the beck meanders through fields, but the section through the village has been straightened.

Settrington Beck flows into the River Derwent some 4 miles (6 km) upstream of Malton. The beck flows for 11.2 kilometres (7 mi) and drains an area of 32.4 square kilometres (12.5 sq mi). Originally, the beck ran due westwards past Auburn Hill and entered the River Derwent further downstream past Malton. The 3-mile (4.8 km) valley that the beck ran down is now dry, and what caused the beck to change its course to northwards from North Grimston is unknown.

There are 35 chalk stream watercourses in the eastern part of Yorkshire, with most being in the East Riding of Yorkshire, and 34 of these flow into the Humber Estuary, while the remaining one (the Gypsey Race) flows directly into the North Sea. The Gypsey Race and Settrington Beck are some of the most northerly chalk streams in Europe as the chalklands reaches its extremity northwards around Settrington, and curves eastwards towards the sea.

In the headwaters of Settrington Beck, water flows through three SSSIs; Cow Cliff Pasture & Quarry, Nine Spring Dale, and Wharram Quarry. The Environment Agency have designated the beck as having a high flow rate, and, as the beck is a chalk stream, the flow rate is protected by limiting the amount of water that can be abstracted from the beck.

A corn mill is known to have existed on the beck in Settrington from at least 1790 (though research suggests another mill pre-dates the 1790 one). It was last used for corn milling in the Second World War and the adjoining Mill House has been converted into a private dwelling which is now a grade II listed building.

== Wildlife ==
Kingfishers, dippers, moorhens and mallards have been observed along the length of the beck. A weir that is more than 3 metres (9.8 ft) high at the northern end of the beck prevents fish passage upstream from the River Derwent. This area used to feed water into a fish farm, and the remains of signal crayfish have been found around the weir.
