= Porton railway station =

Disused railway station in Porton, Wiltshire

Porton

General information
- Location: Porton, Wiltshire; England
- Coordinates: 51.1262°N 1.7250°W
- Platforms: 2

Other information
- Status: Disused

History
- Pre-grouping: London and South Western Railway
- Post-grouping: Southern Railway

Key dates
- 1 May 1857: Opened
- 9 September 1968: Closed
Location

Porton railway station served the village of Porton, in Wiltshire, England, from 1854 to 1968 on the West of England line.

== History ==
The station was opened on 1 May 1857, along with the line from Andover to Milford. It closed on 9 September 1968. The station was serviced by a goods yard, which closed in 1962.

Between 1916 and 1952 the Porton Military Railway (2 foot gauge) ran between the goods yard at Porton station and the military camp, almost a mile to the northeast.

== Proposed reopening ==
A proposal was made to reopen the station to service the Porton Down science park. However, reopening the station was not seen as economically viable, as it was estimated that the reopening would cost £6m, and would affect the timetables for the line, thus affecting services to the other stations on the line. It was instead decided that a shuttle bus would run in between the science park and Grateley railway station.

Preceding station	Disused railways	Following station
Idmiston Halt; Station closed	Southern Railway; West of England line	Salisbury; Line and station open
