= Winterbourne, Wiltshire =

Civil parish in Wiltshire, England

Coordinates: 51.11°N 1.76°W

Winterbourne
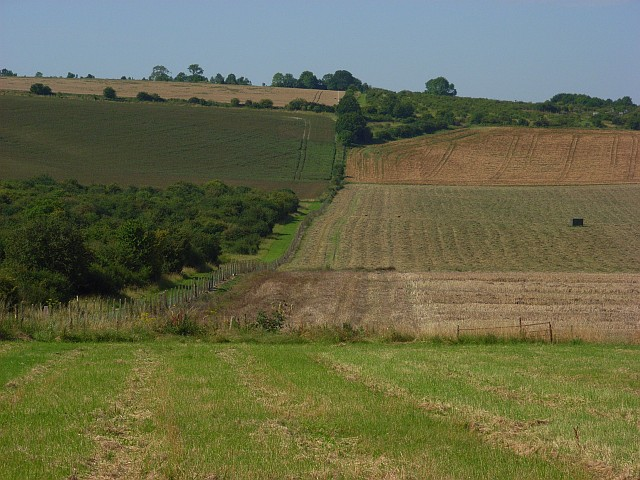
- Farmland near Winterbourne Gunner

- Location within Wiltshire
- Population: 1,238 (in 2011)
- OS grid reference: SU1734
- Civil parish: Winterbourne
- Unitary authority: Wiltshire
- Ceremonial county: Wiltshire
- Region: South West
- Country: England
- Sovereign state: United Kingdom
- Post town: Salisbury
- Postcode district: SP4
- Dialling code: 01980
- Police: Wiltshire
- Fire: Dorset and Wiltshire
- Ambulance: South Western
- UK Parliament: Salisbury
- Website: thewinterbournes.co.uk

Winterbourne is a civil parish in south east Wiltshire, England, about 3.5 miles (6 km) northeast of Salisbury. The parish encompasses the contiguous villages of Winterbourne Dauntsey, Winterbourne Earls and Winterbourne Gunner, together with the hamlet of Hurdcott south of Winterbourne Earls (not to be confused with Hurdcott Manor near Baverstock).

The Port Way Roman road passes the villages on higher ground, on its route towards Old Sarum. The settlements are in the Bourne valley which also carries the A338 road and the West of England Main Line railway. Winterbourne was an earlier name for the river, which becomes dry in summer.

The parish has one Grade I listed building: the 12th-century St Mary's church at Winterbourne Gunner.

== Local government ==
The civil parish elects a parish council. It is in the area of Wiltshire Council unitary authority, which is responsible for all significant local government functions.

The parish was created in 1934 by amalgamating the three ancient parishes of Winterbournes Earl, Dauntsey and Gunner. In 1986, a new parish of Firsdown was created on land in the east of Winterbourne parish.

== See also ==
Other Wiltshire parishes:

- Winterbourne Bassett
- Winterbourne Monkton
- Winterbourne Stoke
