= Winterbourne (stream) =

Stream or river that is dry through the summer months

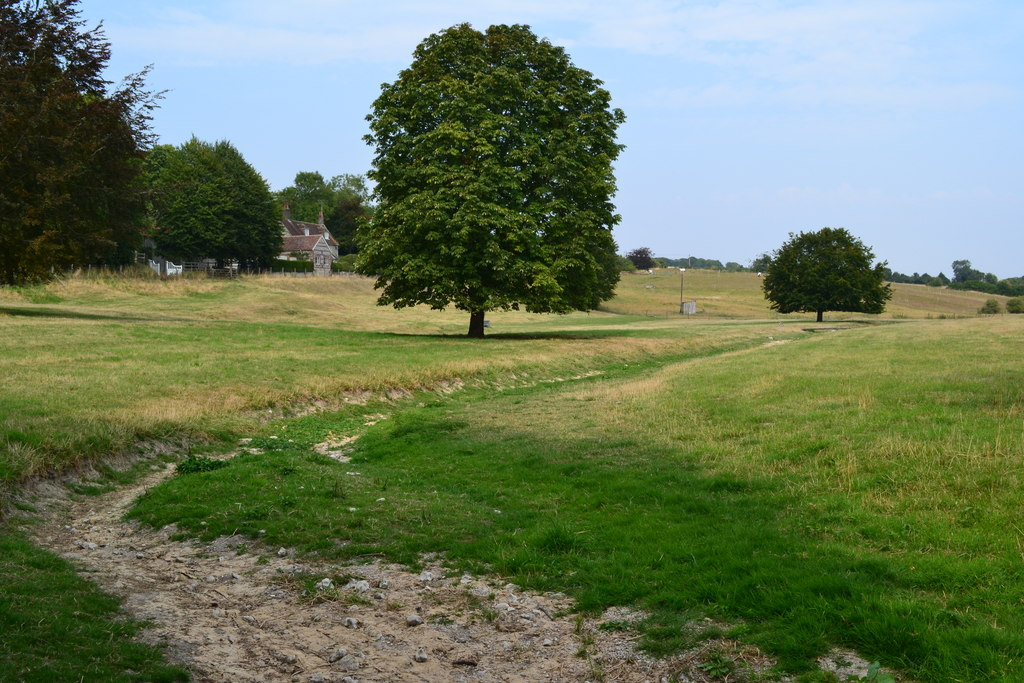
The dry bed of the River Ebble in Wiltshire, pictured in August

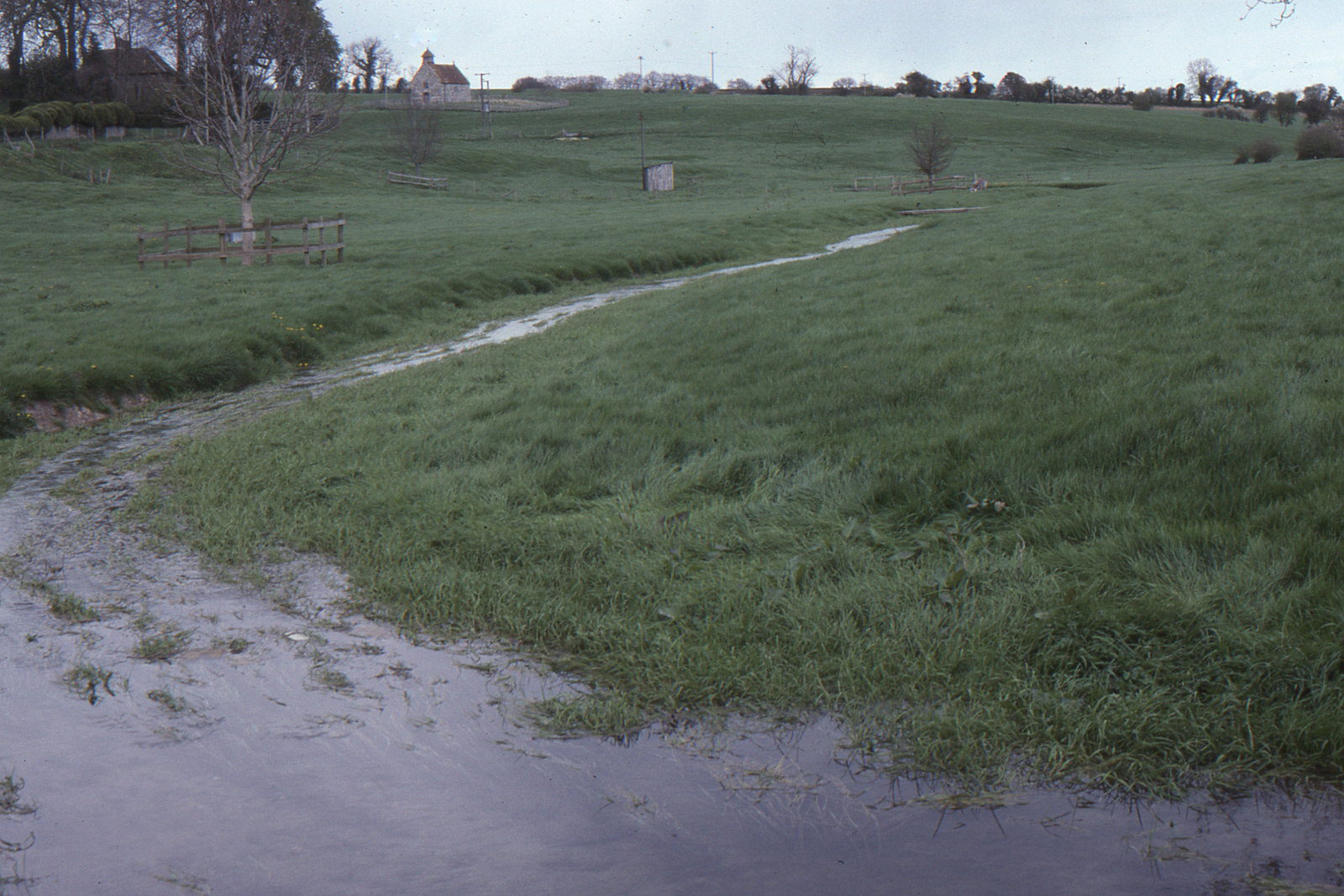
The same location in April

A winterbourne is a kind of intermittent stream fed by an aquifer, primarily chalk aquifers, but occasionally limestone aquifers. The winterbourne flows in the winter, typically from December until approximately April, before declining until the following winter. When it rains, the porous chalk holds water in its aquifer and releases the water at a steady rate. During the dry season, the water table can fall below the level of the stream bed, causing it to dry up. The length of the dry phase depends on the longitudinal position of the stream.

The word derives from the Old English winterburna, meaning "winter stream". It is common as an element in English place names.

== Controversy ==
The use of chalk aquifers as a domestic water source in Britain has turned many streams and rivers into artificial winterbournes. This effect is controversial, and local campaigns have often been successful in reducing aquifer abstraction and reversing the effect. To mitigate the effects of water abstraction from valuable chalk streams in southern England, a joint venture between the Portsmouth Water Company and Southern Water PLC is building a reservoir at Havant. It will be filled with surplus water abstracted from local springs in the winter. The purpose of the reservoir is to facilitate a reduction in abstractions of water from the River Test and the River Itchen in Hampshire as well as to increase the resilience of future water supply.

== See also ==
- Places called Winterbourne
- Arroyo (watercourse)
- Chalk stream
- Perennial stream, a stream or river that flows all year round
- Wadi
- Gypsey (spring), East Yorkshire term for a winterbourne
- Brook

== Sources ==
- Berrie, A.D; Wright, J.F. (1984). Whitton, B.A. (ed.). "The Winterbourne Stream". Ecology of European Rivers. Oxford: Blackwell Scientific Publications: 176–206.
- Chief scientists group (November 2023). "Annex to the review of the research and scientific understanding of drought" (PDF). Bristol: Environment Agency.
- Chisolm, Hugh, ed. (1911). Borne . Vol. 4 (11 ed.). Cambridge University Press. pp. 332–333. – via Wikisource.
- Cope, William H. (1883). A Glossary of Hampshire Words and Phrases. London: English Dialect Society. OCLC 156102078.
- Ekwall, Eilert (1991). English Place Names (4 ed.). Oxford: OUP. ISBN 0-19-869103-3.
- Gelling, Margaret (1984). Place Names in the Landscape: The Geographical Roots of Britain's Place-names. London: Phoenix Press. ISBN 1-84212-264-9.
- Glover, Judith (2002). Sussex Place-Names. Newbury: Countryside Books. ISBN 1-85306-484-X.
- PWC (2023). "Business plan 2025 to 2030 PT02 delivering Havant thicket reservoir for our customers and the region" (PDF). Portsmouth Water Company.
- Rogers, Adam (2013). Water and Roman Urbanism: Towns, Waterscapes, Land Transformation and Experience in Roman Britain. Brill. ISBN 978-90-04-24787-1.
- Sussex Wildlife Trust (2026). "Chalk Streams". Sussex Wildlife trust.
- Sussex Wildlife Trust (2013). "Chalk Streams" (PDF). Sussex Wildlife trust.
- White, J.C. (2016). "Macroinvertebrate community responses to hydrological controls and groundwater abstraction effects across intermittent and perennial headwater streams". Science of the Total Environment. doi:10.1016/j.scitotenv.2017.06.081.
