= Porton =

- Village
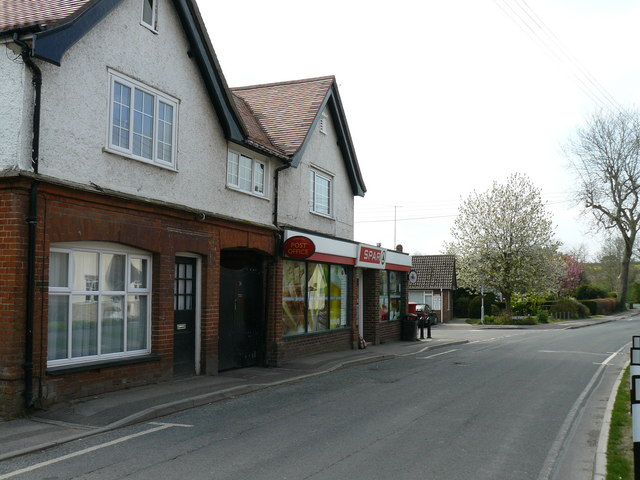
- Post Office and shop, Porton
- Interactive map of Porton
- Coordinates: 51°7′43″N 1°43′56″W
- Country: England
- County: Wiltshire
- Civil parish: Idmiston

Porton is a village in the Bourne valley, Wiltshire, England, about 5 miles (8 km) northeast of Salisbury. It is the largest settlement in Idmiston civil parish.

The village gives its name to the nearby Porton Down military science park, which is home to the Defence Science and Technology Laboratory and related businesses.

== Religious sites ==
The Baptist faith flourished in this part of Wiltshire in the 17th century, then declined in the 18th. A chapel was built to the south of Porton village in 1865 and enlarged in the 1920s; it was still in use in 2022, but its closure was confirmed at a meeting of the Baptist Union of Great Britain in March 2025.

The Anglican Church of St Nicholas was built in 1877 to designs by J. L. Pearson, replacing a building from the 16th century or earlier. Built in flint with brick dressings under a tiled roof, the church has a nave with a south porch and bellcote, and a chancel with a vestry. The octagonal font is from the 14th or 15th century, and there is stained glass by Clayton and Bell.

St Nicholas became the parish church in 1977, when the older All Saints Church at Idmiston was declared redundant.

== Railways ==
In 1857 the London and South Western Railway company opened its line from Andover to Milford station at Salisbury, following the Bourne valley and passing southeast of Porton. There was a station at Porton from the opening of the line until 1968, with a goods yard until 1962. The railway remains in use as part of the West of England line but there are no local stations.

Between 1916 and 1946, the Porton Down Camp Military Railway (2 foot gauge) ran between the goods yard at Porton station and the Camp, almost a mile to the northeast.

== Amenities ==
The local school is St Nicholas' CE (VA) Primary School, built in 1972 to replace a school built at Idmiston in 1869.

The former Railway Hotel, near the site of the station, is now the Porton Hotel and Restaurant.

== Protected areas ==
There are two Sites of Special Scientific Interest (SSSIs) in the area. Porton Meadows is 17.6 hectares (43 acres) of botanically rich unimproved neutral grassland in the floodplain of the River Bourne, which has largely escaped intensive agriculture. A much larger area, 1,561 hectares (3,860 acres) extending into Hampshire and known as Porton Down SSSI, includes grassland, scrub and woodland; it constitutes the largest uninterrupted tract of semi-natural chalk grassland in Britain.
