= Winterbourne Gunner =

Village in Wiltshire, England

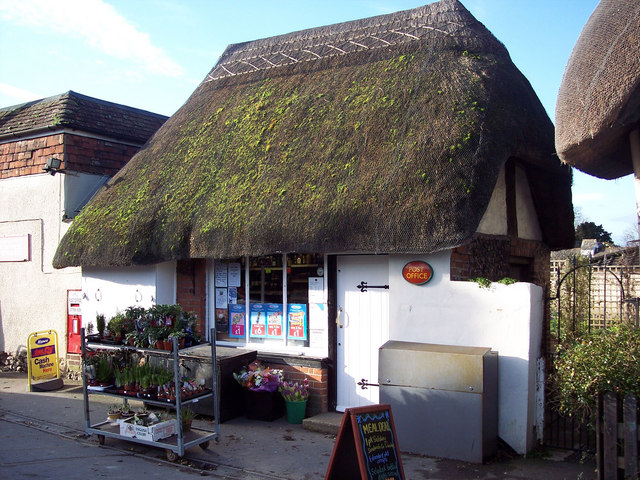
- Post Office, Winterbourne Gunner

- Location within Wiltshire
- Civil parish: Winterbourne
- Unitary authority: Wiltshire
- Ceremonial county: Wiltshire
- Region: South West
- Country: England
- Sovereign state: United Kingdom
- Post town: Salisbury
- Postcode district: SP4
- Dialling code: 01980
- Police: Wiltshire
- Fire: Dorset and Wiltshire
- Ambulance: South Western
- UK Parliament: Salisbury
- Website: The Winterbournes

Winterbourne Gunner is a village and former civil parish, now in the parish of Winterbourne, in Wiltshire, England, about 4 miles (6 km) northeast of Salisbury. The village is near the River Bourne and the A338 road, and is close to Winterbourne Dauntsey. In 1931 the parish had a population of 292. On 1 April 1934, the parish was abolished and merged with Winterbourne Earls and Winterbourne Dauntsey to form Winterbourne parish.

Location of the Saxon graves excavated by Time Team at 51°6′57.18″N 1°44′26.23″W

== Toponymy and archaeology ==
The place-name 'Winterbourne Gunner' is first attested in 1275 in the Rotuli hundredorum, where it appears as Winterburn Gonnore. The name means 'winter river (i.e. one dry in summer) belonging to Gunnora de la Mare', who held the manor in 1250, according to the Book of Fees in the National Archives. Gunnora is a Norman woman's name of Old Scandinavian origin, as in Old Norse Gunnvor or Gunnor.

Winterbourne Gunner has considerable archaeological interest. In 1960 workmen digging a pipeline came across a series of early Saxon graves, which subsequent excavations found to be particularly rich in grave goods.

A 1994 dig in a nearby building plot by television programme Time Team (series 2, "The Saxon Graves") found several more early 6th-century Saxon graves near Salt Lane, and discovered a series of Bronze Age features including a pond barrow and associated round barrows and urn burials, which the Saxons appear to have respected when selecting their burial sites. These show up as circular crop marks, with a diameter of 20 to 30 feet. The Bronze Age features were designated as Scheduled Monuments in July 1994.

In 1999 a house at Winterbourne Gunner was the subject of a Series 2 episode of the BBC television series Meet the Ancestors.

== Later history ==
The London and South Western Railway's line between Andover and Salisbury opened in 1857, following the Bourne valley and passing just east of Winterbourne Gunner village. There was a station and goods yard nearby at Porton, which closed to goods in 1962 and passengers in 1968.

There has been a military research and training site southeast of the village, beyond the railway line, since the First World War. A 1958 map shows many buildings, labelled simply as 'Barracks'; the site was refurbished in 2005 and is now the home of the Defence Chemical, Biological, Radiation and Nuclear Centre, as well as a training centre for the National Ambulance Resilience Unit.

== Parish church ==
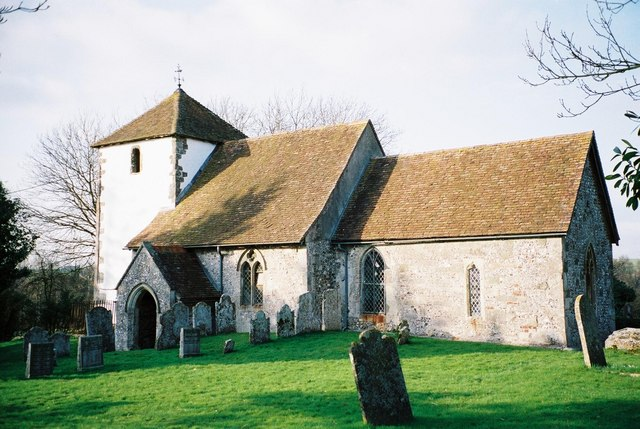
St Mary's Church

The Church of England parish church of St Mary was designated as a Grade I listed building in 1958. It has twelfth- and thirteenth-century origins with additions in 1687 and 1810, and a restoration in 1886. It is constructed of flint with limestone dressings. The low, unbuttressed twelfth-century tower is at the west end and is rendered and whitewashed, and topped with a pyramidal tiled roof. The nave is short, and a porch was added on the south side at the time the south aisle was removed. The interior has a fourteenth-century roof over the nave with arch-braced trussed rafters with a moulded central tie beam. The font is late twelfth or early thirteenth century while the panelled limestone pulpit is nineteenth century.

A united benefice was created for the three Winterbourne villages in 1924. A team ministry was created for the area in 1973, and today the church is part of the Bourne Valley Churches grouping, alongside five nearby village churches.
