= Winterbourne Earls =

Village in Wiltshire, England

Coordinates: 51.107°N 1.754°W

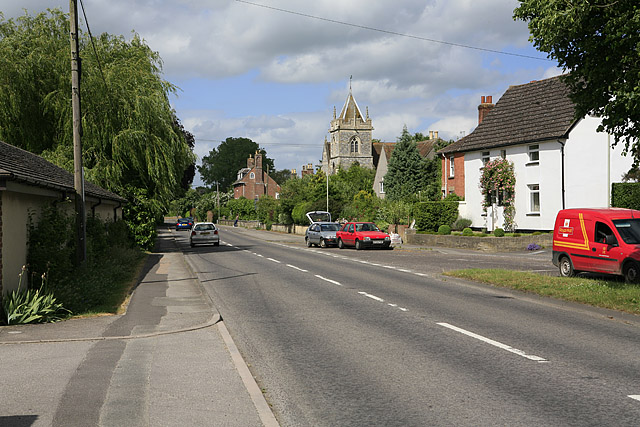
- A338, Winterbourne Earls

- Location within Wiltshire
- Civil parish: Winterbourne
- Unitary authority: Wiltshire
- Ceremonial county: Wiltshire
- Region: South West
- Country: England
- Sovereign state: United Kingdom
- Post town: Salisbury
- Postcode district: SP4
- Dialling code: 01980
- Police: Wiltshire
- Fire: Dorset and Wiltshire
- Ambulance: South Western
- UK Parliament: Salisbury
- Website: The Winterbournes

Winterbourne Earls is a village in Wiltshire, England. The village is in the Bourne valley on the A338 road, about 3.4 miles (5 km) northeast of Salisbury.

In 1931, the parish had a population of 242. The village adjoins Winterbourne Dauntsey. It is part of the civil parish of Winterbourne, formed on 1 April 1934 by amalgamating the three ancient parishes of Winterbourne Earls, Winterbourne Dauntsey and Winterbourne Gunner.

== History ==
Domesday Book in 1086 recorded a settlement with 28 households at Wintreburne, on land held by Edward of Salisbury.

The name "Earls" came from the Earls of Salisbury who were lords of the manor in the thirteenth century. Since then, the manor has only changed hands twice: in 1551, it was leased to the Nicholas family by its owners, the Bishops of Salisbury, then in 1799, the Fort family took the lease and later bought the manor, retaining it until the mid-twentieth century.

== Churches ==
A Wesleyan Methodist chapel was built in 1843 at Hurdcott, immediately to the south of Winterbourne Earls. The chapel closed in 1967 and the community is served by Bourne Valley Methodist Church at Winterbourne Dauntsey.

The Church of England parish church of St Michael and All Angels serves the village and Winterbourne Dauntsey. It was built next to the main road in 1867–8 by T.H. Wyatt and replaced an older church, probably built in the 12th century; St Edward's at Winterbourne Dauntsey was closed at the same time. Fragments of both older churches were used in the new church, and there are two roundels of 13th-century glass. The font bowl, pulpit and some of the monuments are also of older dates.

At some point before 1867, the benefices of Winterbourne Earls and Dauntsey had been united and made a perpetual curacy. Winterbourne Gunner was added to the union in 1924. A team ministry was created for the area in 1973, and in the same year the Dauntsey and Earls parishes were united. Today, the church is part of the Bourne Valley Churches grouping, alongside five nearby village churches.

== Facilities ==
Winterbourne Earls CofE Primary School serves the village and surrounding communities. The school was built in 1992 on a new site to replace a National School dating from 1872.

There was a pub at Hurdcott (the Black Horse) which closed in 2023, and another at Winterbourne Dauntsey (the Winterbourne Arms).

== Notable people ==
Henry Sherfield (c.1572–1634, lawyer and Member of Parliament) lived in the village.

Notable members of the Nicholas family include Sir Edward Nicholas (1593–1669), MP and Secretary of State, and his younger brother Matthew (1594–1661) who rose to become Dean of St Paul's Cathedral and is buried at Winterbourne Earls.
