= Firsdown =

Coordinates: 51.099°N 1.699°W

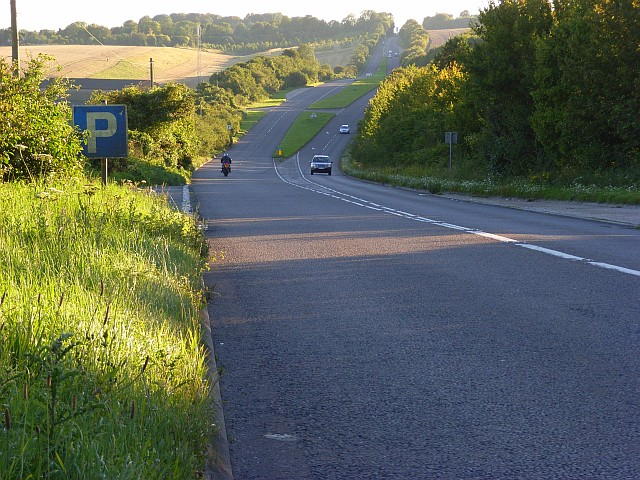
- The A30, Firsdown parish

- Location within Wiltshire
- Population: 581 (in 2011)
- OS grid reference: SU212333
- Civil parish: Firsdown
- Unitary authority: Wiltshire
- Ceremonial county: Wiltshire
- Region: South West
- Country: England
- Sovereign state: United Kingdom
- Post town: Salisbury
- Postcode district: SP5
- Dialling code: 01980
- Police: Wiltshire
- Fire: Dorset and Wiltshire
- Ambulance: South Western
- UK Parliament: Salisbury
- Website: Parish Council

Firsdown is a civil parish in Wiltshire, England, 5 miles (8.0 km) northeast of Salisbury.

Before the 1950s the area was sparsely populated downland within the parish of Winterbourne. By 1976 housing estates had been built on both sides of Firs Road, which links Winterslow with the A30. The civil parish of Firsdown was created in 1986.

The parish includes the Figsbury Ring, a biological Site of Special Scientific Interest which contains prehistoric earthworks.
