= Baverstock =

Village in Wiltshire, England

Coordinates: 51.084°N 1.961°W

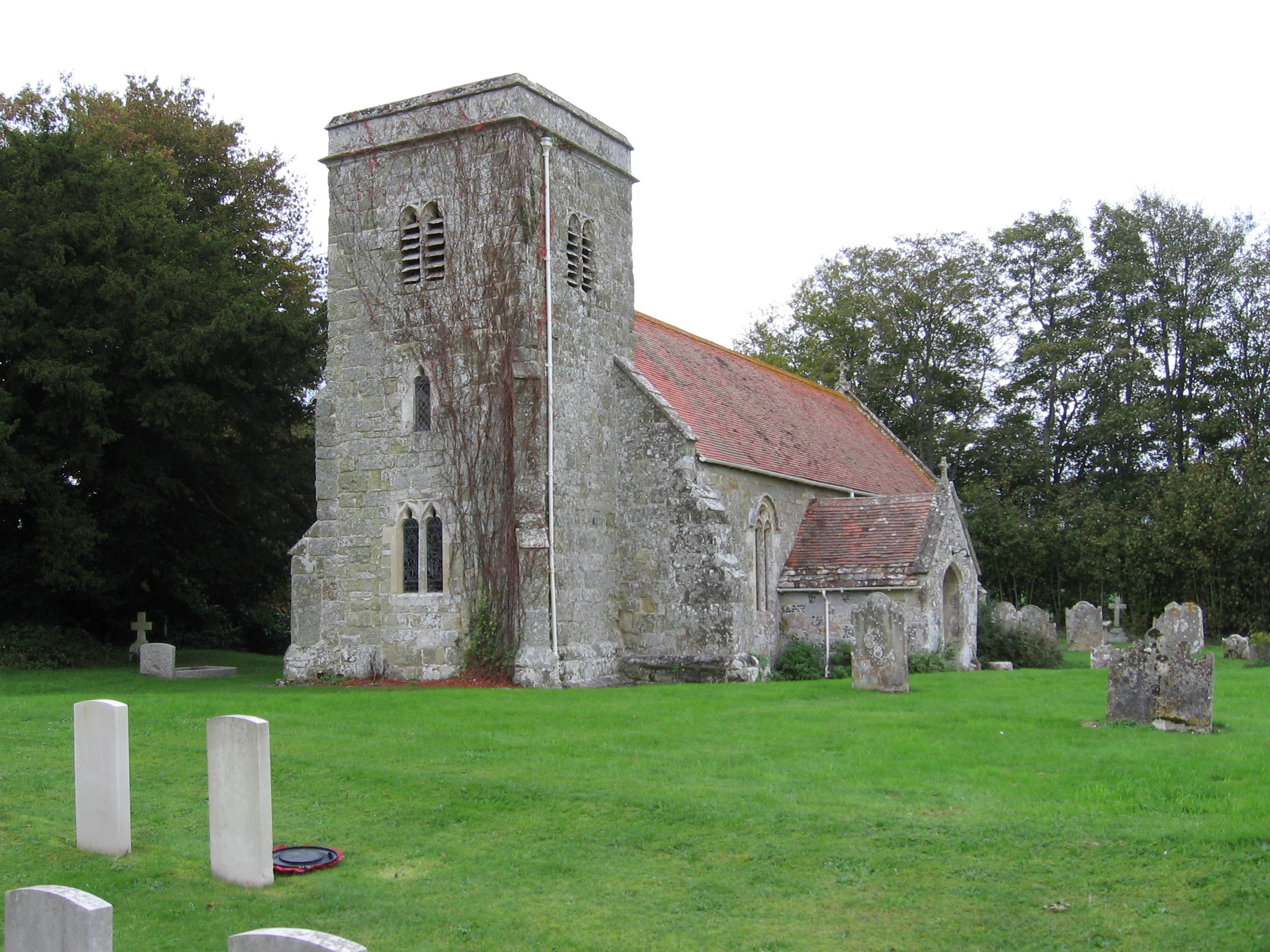
- St Editha's Church, Baverstock

- Location within Wiltshire
- OS grid reference: SU028316
- Civil parish: Dinton
- Unitary authority: Wiltshire
- Ceremonial county: Wiltshire
- Region: South West
- Country: England
- Sovereign state: United Kingdom
- Post town: Salisbury
- Postcode district: SP3
- Dialling code: 01722
- Police: Wiltshire
- Fire: Dorset and Wiltshire
- Ambulance: South Western
- UK Parliament: Salisbury

Baverstock is a small village and former civil parish, now in the parish of Dinton, in Wiltshire, England, about 7 miles (11 km) west of Salisbury. The village has 10 private dwellings, a church and several farm buildings. The manor of Hurdcott, a hamlet of a few houses, lies to the southwest of the village (not to be confused with Hurdcott near Winterbourne Earls). In 1931 the parish had a population of 43.

The name Baverstock derives from the Old English Babbastoc meaning 'Babba's place'.

To the north of the village is cultivated chalk downland and extensive mixed woodland. To the south the village is bordered by the River Nadder meandering through water meadows. The road through the village from the B3089 terminates in unmetalled farm track.

Baverstock civil parish was reduced in size when its southeast part, including Hurdcott hamlet, was transferred to Barford St Martin on 24 March 1884; the whole of Baverstock parish was absorbed into Dinton on 1 April 1934.

North of the village lies Baverstock Juniper Bank, a 2.6 hectares (6.4 acres) biological Site of Special Scientific Interest at grid reference SU035336.

== Church ==
The Church of England parish church of Saint Editha is dedicated to the Wiltshire saint Edith of Wilton and stands on the brow of a slope facing south across the Nadder valley. The building is from the 14th and 15th centuries, with restoration in 1880–1893 by William Butterfield. The building is Grade II* listed. The tower has a ring of three bells, two of which date from the 15th century. Today the church is part of the Nadder Valley team ministry.

The churchyard contains, among others, the graves of 32 Australian soldiers from World War I. Soldiers were encamped locally before being transported to the war theatre in France. The majority died from infectious illness.

== Manor ==
Baverstock Manor is a Grade II* listed house from the 16th century, with later alterations and 1930s restoration.

== Pub ==
Close to the B3089 is the Penruddocke Arms, a public house named for the Penruddocke family who lived in neighbouring Compton Chamberlayne during the 18th and 19th centuries.
