= John Henry Leech =

English entomologist

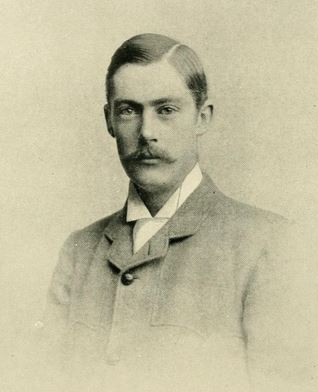
John Henry Leech

John Henry Leech (5 December 1862 – 29 December 1900, Hurdcott House, Salisbury) was an English entomologist who specialised in Lepidoptera and Coleoptera.

Leech was born of John and Elizabeth (née Ashworth) Leech in Bank Hall, near Preston, Lancashire. His father was a wealthy merchant.

Leech was educated at Eton College and Trinity Hall, Cambridge. He lost his right hand in an accident while partridge shooting in Cambridge.

In 1889 Leech married Beatrice Ellen Leatthias, daughter of wealthy New York businessman Henry Leatthias. They went to live in Hurdcott House, Barford St Martin, Wiltshire.

Leech's collections from China, Japan and Kashmir are in the Natural History Museum, London, along with specimens from Morocco, the Canary Islands and Madeira. He wrote British Pyralides (1886) and Butterflies from China, Japan and Corea in three volumes (1892–1894).

Leech was a fellow of the Linnean Society and the Royal Entomological Society and a member of the Société entomologique de France and Entomologischen Verein zu Berlin. In 1885 a lizard species, Enyalius leechii, was named after him.

He is buried in St Edith's churchyard, Baverstock, Salisbury, Wiltshire, UK.

== Sources ==
- Anonymous (1901). "Leech, J. H." Entomologist's Monthly Magazine. (2) 12 (37)(2): 49-50.
- Anonymous (1901). "Leech, J. H." Entomologist. 34: 33-38.
- Gilbert, P. (2000). Butterfly Collectors and Painters. Four Centuries of Colour Plates from the Library Collections of the Natural History Museum, London. Singapore: Beaumont Publishing Pte Ltd.
- Inoue, H. (2005). "John Henry Leech (1862–1900)". The Pioneers of Moth-Fauna of Japan. 1 Yugato.
- Verrall, G. H. (1900). Proceedings of the Entomological Society of London.
