= Newton Tony =

Village in Wiltshire, England

Coordinates: 51.162°N 1.692°W

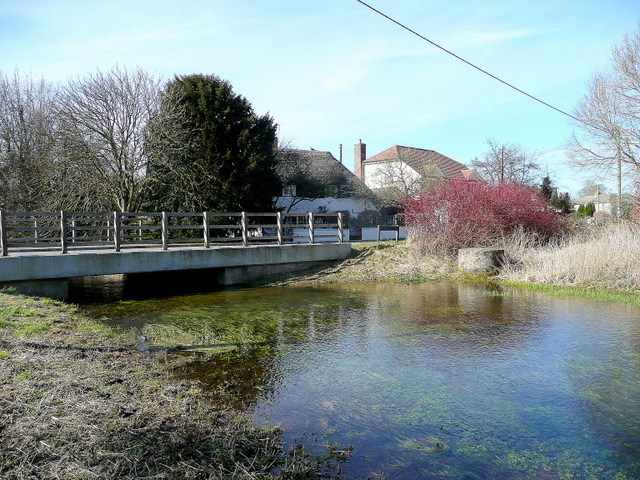
- River Bourne at Newton Tony

- Location within Wiltshire
- Population: 381 (2011 Census)
- OS grid reference: SU216404
- Civil parish: Newton Tony
- Unitary authority: Wiltshire
- Ceremonial county: Wiltshire
- Region: South West
- Country: England
- Sovereign state: United Kingdom
- Post town: SALISBURY
- Postcode district: SP4
- Dialling code: 01980
- Police: Wiltshire
- Fire: Dorset and Wiltshire
- Ambulance: South Western
- UK Parliament: Salisbury
- Website: Parish Council

Newton Tony (formerly Newton Toney) is a rural English village and civil parish in the county of Wiltshire, close to the border with Hampshire. Situated in the Bourne Valley, Newton Tony is about 9 miles (14 km) north-east of its post town, Salisbury. Wilbury House, a Grade I listed 17th-century mansion, stands in parkland in the north of the parish. In 2011 the parish had a population of 381.

== History ==
The Port Way Roman road crossed the parish to the south-east. A settlement was recorded in the Domesday Book of 1086 as Newentone, on seven carucates (ploughlands) of land held by Alfred of Marlborough. By 1257, the manor was held by Roger de Tony (or Tosny), hence the suffix Tony; the last of that line to inherit was Alice de Toeni (c.1284–c.1325), later Countess of Warwick.

The manor house, no longer standing, was in the north of the village; from the later 17th century it was the home of the Fiennes family. From 1710 it was superseded by Wilbury House, about 0.75 miles (1.2 km) north-east of the village.

A church had been built by the 12th century; the present church is a complete rebuild of 1844. A Wesleyan Methodist chapel was built in 1877 and closed in 1981.

Until the late 20th century, the name of the village and parish was Newton Toney.

== Governance ==
Most local government functions are carried out by Wiltshire Council, a unitary authority. The parish forms part of the electoral division of Winterslow and Upper Bourne Valley, which elects one councillor.

Newton Tony is represented in the House of Commons as part of the constituency of Salisbury. Since the 2010 general election, Salisbury has been represented in Parliament by the Conservative MP John Glen.

== Geography ==
Newton Tony is approximately 9 miles (14 km) north-east of its post town, Salisbury, about 30 miles (48 km) north-west of Southampton and about 40 miles (64 km) south-east of Bath. Nearby towns and villages include Cholderton, Allington, Amesbury and Grateley.

Newton Tony lies in the valley of the River Bourne, which cuts through the village.

== Religious sites ==
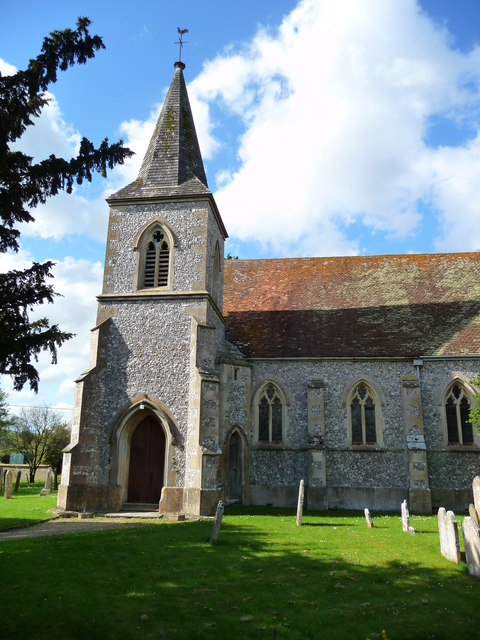
St Andrew's church

The parish church of St Andrew was built in 1844 to a design in 14th-century style by Thomas Henry Wyatt and David Brandon, replacing an older church on the same site. According to one source, it was built at the expense of the Malet family; inside are monuments to several of their members. The Grade II listed building is in flint with limestone dressings, and above the south porch rises a short tower with a shingled spire.

The stone font, a plain bowl, is 12th-century. One of the four bells was cast at the Salisbury foundry c.1499. Today the parish is within the area of the Bourne Valley group, alongside five neighbouring rural parishes.

The five-bay former rectory, uphill from the church, was built for Reverend John Akins in 1778, in Flemish brick on a stone plinth.

A redbrick Wesleyan Methodist chapel was built in the High Street in 1877; it closed in 1981.

== Notable buildings ==
Wilbury House is an 18th-century house designed by William Benson. It has been designated a Grade I listed building. A combined summer house and ice house in the grounds, from the same date, is designated Grade II*.

West Farmhouse, at the north end of the village, is a flint and limestone building from the 17th century which incorporates part of a 15th-century house. At the south end, Manor Farm is from the late 18th century.

== Railways ==
In 1857 the London and South Western Railway company opened a line from Andover to Milford station at Salisbury, which crosses the parish south-east of Newton Tony village, parallel to the Port Way. The railway remains in use as part of the West of England Main Line; the nearest station is Grateley, some 3 miles (5 km) east of Newton Tony village.

The Amesbury and Military Camp Light Railway, opened in 1902, connected with the main line to the east of the village. It carried largely military goods and passengers to Amesbury, extending later to Bulford, Larkhill and Rollestone. There was a station with two platforms, a goods siding and cattle yard west of Newton Tony, to the south of the Allington road. The line closed to passengers in 1952 and to goods in 1963, after which the track was dismantled.

== Amenities ==
Newton Tony C of E Primary School serves the village and neighbouring communities. It was opened in the 1950s on the same site as a national school built in 1857, which was destroyed by fire. Land for the school had been given by Sir Alexander Malet.

The village has a recreation ground and a village hall. The village pub, the Malet Arms, is in a building from the early 18th century.

== RSPB nature reserve ==
The RSPB bought Manor farm in 2005 and manage it as RSPB Winterbourne Downs for the benefit of farmland wildlife, especially the stone curlew. Some fields continue to be grazed by livestock, while over 200 hectares (490 acres) have been returned to chalk grassland. The nature reserve abuts Porton Down, where there is further protected grassland and a Site of Special Scientific Interest.

== Notable people ==
Thomas West, 1st Baron West inherited the manor from his father in 1386.

Nathaniel Fiennes, MP, officer in the Parliamentarian army and Cromwell's Lord Keeper of the Great Seal, was lord of the manor in later life and died at Newton Tony in 1669. His daughter Celia (1662–1741), brought up there, became well known for a series of books recording her travels around Britain. Both their graves lie in the village churchyard.

Sir William Benson bought the house and manor sometime after 1691, and his son, also William, built Wilbury House around 1710. Later owners included Fulke Greville (1717–1806), Sheriff of Wiltshire for 1744, and later MP for Monmouth and a minor diplomat. Between 1803 and 1925, Wilbury was the home of the Malet baronets, beginning with Sir Charles (1752–1815) who had been created a baronet in 1791 for his diplomatic services in India, while an official of the East India Company; his son and grandson were also diplomats. The house, park and two farms were bought in 1939 by Edward Grenfell, 1st Baron St Just, a partner in the merchant bank Morgan, Grenfell & Co., MP for the City of London and a director of the Bank of England. His son Peter (1922–1984) inherited in 1941, and his second wife Maria Britneva continued to live there until 1994. Wilbury was owned and restored from 1996 by Miranda Guinness, widow of Benjamin Guinness of the Dublin brewing family, and inherited by her son Rory in 2010.

George Whitaker had been the first provost at Trinity College, Toronto and Archdeacon of York, Toronto. After he retired from his posts in Canada in 1881 he was appointed as rector of Newton Tony, but died the next year.
