= Charles Malet =

Charles Malet or Mallet may refer to:

- Sir Charles Malet, 1st Baronet (1752–1815), diplomat
- Sir Charles St Lo Malet, 6th Baronet (1906–1918), of the Malet baronets
- Charles Mallet (1862–1947), British historian and politician
