= Henry Mallet =

Henry Mallet may refer to:

- Henry Mallet, character in Spirited
- Henry Malet of the Malet Baronets
