= William Benson (architect) =

English amateur architect and Whig politician

William Benson (1682 – 2 February 1754) was a talented amateur architect and Whig politician who sat in the House of Commons from 1715 to 1719. In 1718, he arranged to displace the aged Sir Christopher Wren as Surveyor of the King's Works, but his short time in that post was not a success.

== Life ==
Benson was the eldest son of Sir William Benson, Sheriff of London in 1706–07, and his wife Martha Austin, daughter of John Austin, jeweller of London. He made a Grand Tour as a young man, which was extended to a prolonged visit in 1704–1706 to Hanover, the seat of the Elector, who was next in line to the British throne. He paid assiduous court and ingratiated himself with the Elector and his mother the Electress Sophia, pressing unwanted gifts upon the Electress. He also went to Stockholm, far from the usual beaten track. In London he published a Whig tract that offered a warning against Jacobitism, and a polemic against Divine Right of kingship in a Letter to Sir J[acob] B[ankes] addressed transparently to Sir Jacob Bancks; it reached its eleventh edition in 1711 and was translated into French.

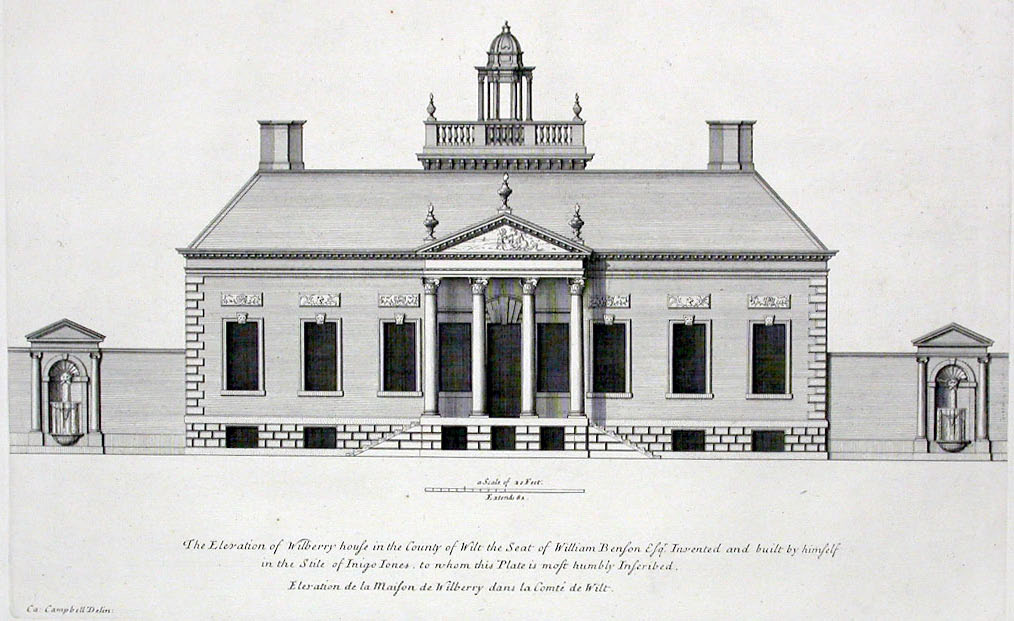
Wilbury House in Vitruvius Britannicus, 1715

Returning to London with fresh impressions of innovative neo-Palladian constructions currently afoot at Herrenhausen, in 1707 he married Eleanor Earle, the daughter of Joseph Earle, a wealthy merchant of Bristol; and received from his father purchases of land in Wiltshire to the value of £5,000. The following February he rented the classical Caroline Amesbury Abbey, Wiltshire, then attributed to Inigo Jones, on a twenty-one-year lease, and in 1709 he set to work designing Wilbury House for himself on a nearby property at Newton Tony, which he purchased that year from Hon. John Fiennes.

Wilbury, the earliest example of neo-Palladianism in England, was a modest villa of one storey, nine bays in length, with a pedimented portico over the three central bays. Above the simply framed windows isolated bas-relief tablets were inserted in the wall. Small windows in a low rusticated basement lit service areas. Chimney stacks stood at the ends of the angled roofs. A central balustraded belvedere with a dome raised on columns crowned the elevation. In this manner Wilbury was illustrated in Colen Campbell's first volume of Vitruvius Britannicus (1715, plates 51–52), credited to Benson as inventor and builder. Later, as Surveyor, Benson appointed the professional Campbell Deputy Surveyor and Chief Clerk.

In 1709 he was appointed High Sheriff of Wiltshire. His interests extended to hydraulics. He carried out a project to bring piped water to Shaftesbury; according to a memoir of the hydraulics engineer John Theophilus Desaguliers, it was actually the invention of Mr Holland, the modest curate of Shaftesbury, but Benson took the credit, which resulted in his election as Whig Member of Parliament.

Benson was elected Member of Parliament for Shaftesbury at the 1715 general election. In 1716 he attended George I on a visit to Hanover, where with "Water Engine" plans in hand, he gave directions for waterworks to be built for the Elector George at Herrenhausen, Hanover, borrowing Mr Holland's smith and foreman; they resulted in the largest fountain in the gardens. The main jet, expected to rise a hundred feet, merely spurted a disappointing ten.

In 1717 he was offered in reversion the post of Auditor of the Imprests, and in 1718 he was appointed Surveyor of the King's Works in place of Sir Christopher Wren. In achieving this appointment he had the assistance of John Aislabie, according to Nicholas Hawksmoor, who was deprived of his double post to provide places for Benson's brother. In accepting a government post he had to stand again for Parliament at Shaftesbury. He won the by-election on 21 November 1718 but was unseated on petition on 24 January 1719.

As Surveyor, Benson's months in office proved disastrous for the professional staff. Howard Colvin noted that "Benson's surveyorship lasted for fifteen months, in the course of which he sacked his ablest subordinates, declared war on his closest colleagues, infuriated the Treasury and finally brought down upon himself the wrath of the House of Lords for falsely insisting that their Chamber was in imminent danger of collapse." The only lasting work produced under Benson's surveyorship was the suite of state rooms at Kensington Palace.

After he was relieved of his position in July 1719, in a flurry of satirical pamphlets, Benson involved himself in the creation of Stourhead, designed by Campbell for Benson's brother-in-law, Henry Hoare. Alexander Pope later ridiculed him in The Dunciad (III.321, IV.111–12) for having erected a monument to John Milton in Westminster Abbey, 1737, then having turned and honoured with a bust by Michael Rysbrack, a distinctly minor writer of Latin verses, Dr Arthur Johnston (1587–1641); in the elaborate procession attending the Goddess Dulness, Benson appeared: "On two unequal crutches propt he came, Milton's on this, on that one Johnston's name" (Dunciad IV.111-12).

Benson stood for Parliament again at Shaftesbury at the 1727 general election. However, he only received four votes and thereupon cut off the water supply. In 1734 he sold Wilbury to his nephew Henry II Hoare and retired to a house in Wimbledon. A product of Benson's retirement was Letters concerning Poetical Translations, and Virgil's and Milton's Arts of Verse &c. (1739), where his unlucky pronouncement (page 61) that "the principal Advantage Virgil has over Milton is Virgil's Rhyme", can hardly have failed to catch Pope's eye, if the volume fell into his hands while he was revising his Dunciad. In 1735 he took over the remunerative post of Auditor of the Imprests which he had been promised in 1717, a position he held until his death.

Benson died on 2 February 1754. He had four sons and three daughters by his first wife, and a son and daughter by his second wife Elizabeth, whom he married after Eleanor's death in 1722.

== Notes ==
Parliament of Great Britain
Preceded by Samuel Rush; Edward Nicholas	Member of Parliament for Shaftesbury; 1715 – 1719; With: Edward Nicholas	Succeeded by Sir Edward des Bouverie; Edward Nicholas
Political offices
Preceded by Sir Christopher Wren	Surveyor of the King's Works; 1718–1719	Succeeded by Sir Thomas Hewett
Preceded by Edward Harley; Thomas Foley	Auditor of the imprests 1735–1754 (in reversion from 1717) with Thomas Foley 1735–1737; William Aislabie 1737–1754	Succeeded by Lewis Watson, 1st Baron Sondes; William Aislabie
