= Susanna Wales =

British artist

Susanna Wales, Lady Malet
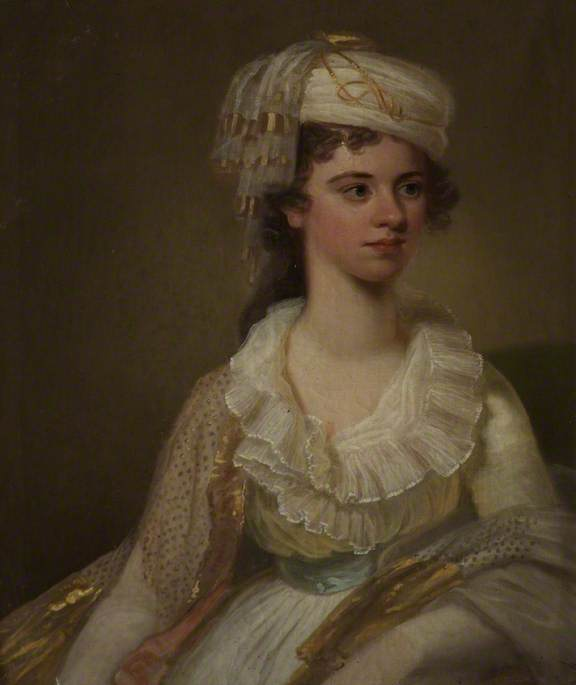
- Born: c.1780
- Died: 21 December 1868
- Known for: Painting
- Spouse: Sir Charles Malet, 1st Baronet

Susanna (sometimes spelled Susannah) Wales, Lady Malet was a British artist.

== Biography ==
Wales was the daughter of Scottish artist James Wales. She appears to have travelled with her father to India in the 1790s, either to Poona or Bombay, before she was married. On 17 September 1799 she married Sir Charles Malet, whom her father had met while working in India. The couple had eight sons and lived at Wilbury House, Wiltshire.

Wales is credited to a portrait of Sir Alexander Malet and his wife Marian Malet, posed in Wilbury House.

Engraver Charles Heath used one of Wales' drawings to create 'The Conclusion of the Cheetah Hunt at Cambay', which appeared in James Forbes' Oriental Memoirs.

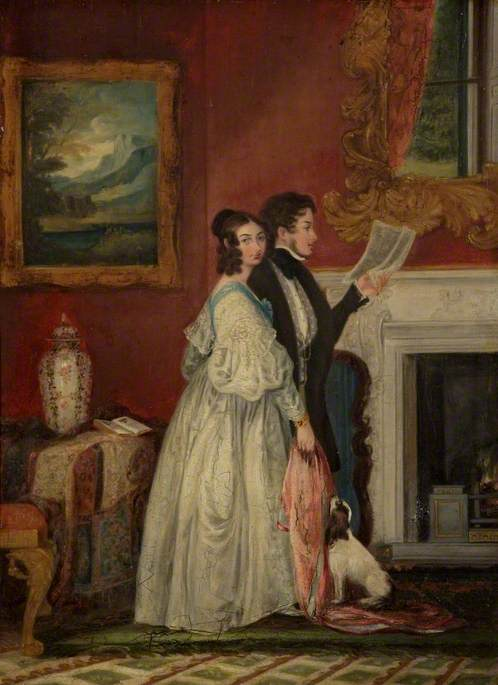
Sir Alexander Malet and his wife Marian in the Drawing Room at Wilbury, painted by Susanna Wales
