= Frank Lascelles (diplomat) =

British diplomat (1841–1920)

The Right Honourable Sir Frank Lascelles GCB GCMG GCVO
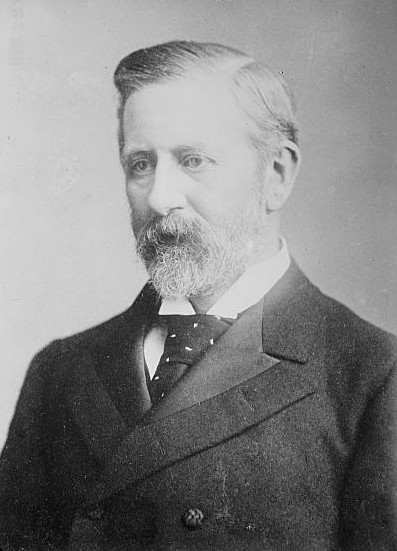
- Lascelles in 1908

British Ambassador to Germany
- In office 1895–1908
- Preceded by: Sir Edward Malet
- Succeeded by: Sir Edward Goschen

British Ambassador to Russia
- In office 1894–1895
- Preceded by: Sir Robert Morier
- Succeeded by: Sir Nicholas O'Conor

British Ambassador to Persia
- In office 1891–1894
- Preceded by: Sir Henry Drummond Wolff
- Succeeded by: Sir Mortimer Durand

Personal details
- Born: 23 March 1841 London, England
- Died: 2 January 1920 (aged 78) London, England
- Spouse: Mary Emma Olliffe
- Relations: William Lascelles (father)
- Education: Harrow School
- Occupation: Diplomat

Sir Frank Cavendish Lascelles GCB GCMG GCVO PC (23 March 1841 – 2 January 1920) was a British diplomat. He served as Ambassador to both Russia and Germany.

== Background and education ==
Lascelles was born in London, the fifth son of William Lascelles, himself the third son of Henry Lascelles, 2nd Earl of Harewood. His mother was Lady Caroline Howard, daughter of George Howard, 6th Earl of Carlisle. He was educated at Harrow and joined the Diplomatic Service in 1861.

== Diplomatic career ==
Lascelles served in junior positions at the British embassies in Madrid, Paris, Rome, Washington, D.C., and Athens. He was trained in the diplomatic service by Richard Lyons, 1st Viscount Lyons, and was a member of the Tory-sympathetic 'Lyons School' of British diplomacy. Lascelles was Consul-General in Egypt from 20 March to 10 October 1879, during the last years of the reign of Khedive Isma'il Pasha. In 1879 Lascelles became Consul-General in Bulgaria, which had been an autonomous principality since the Treaty of Berlin of 1878. He remained in Bulgaria until 1887, and was then Minister (similar to ambassador) to Romania from 1887 to 1891 and to Persia from 1891 to 1894, where his niece Gertrude Bell visited him, starting a lifelong passion for travel. He served briefly as Ambassador to Russia between 1894 and 1895, but in the latter year he was appointed to succeed Sir Edward Malet as Ambassador to Germany.

His tenure in Berlin saw the growing estrangement between Germany and the UK, and Lascelles notably had to deal with the effects of the Kruger telegram only days after his arrival. His relationship with Emperor Wilhelm II was always cordial but he was known to resent the policies of Chancellor Bernhard von Bülow. He resigned as ambassador in 1908 but continued to exercise influence over Anglo-German relations up until the First World War.

Lascelles was knighted KCMG in 1886, promoted to GCMG in 1892, appointed GCB in 1897, and GCVO in 1904 following King Edward VII's meeting with Emperor Wilhelm II at Kiel. He was admitted to the Privy Council in 1894.

== Family ==
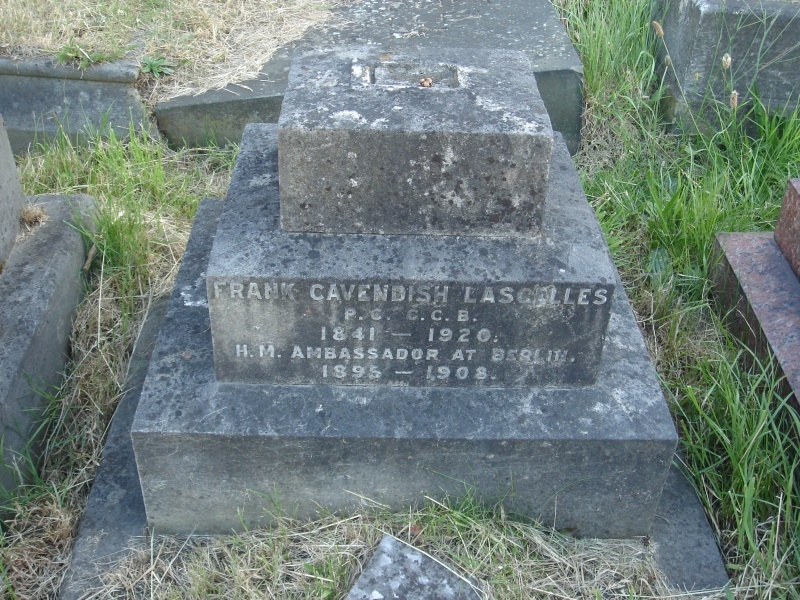
Funerary monument, Brompton Cemetery, London.

In 1869 Lascelles married Mary Emma Olliffe (1845–1897), daughter of Sir Joseph Olliffe who was physician to the British Embassy in Paris. They had three children:

- William Frank Lascelles (21 March 1863 – 8 March 1913), married Lady Sybil Beauclerk (1871–1910), daughter of William Beauclerk, 10th Duke of St Albans. They were the parents of Mary Montagu Douglas Scott, Duchess of Buccleuch.
- Gerald Claud Lascelles (19 July 1869 – 26 June 1919), married Cecil Raffo.
- Florence Caroline Lascelles (27 January 1876 – 9 December 1961), married Sir Cecil Spring Rice.

Lascelles survived his wife by over twenty years and died in 1920, aged 78. He is buried in Brompton Cemetery, London.

== Bibliography ==
- Chirol, Valentine (1927). "Lascelles, Sir Frank Cavendish". In Davis, H. W. C.; Weaver, J. R. H. (eds.). Dictionary of National Biography: 1912–1921. Oxford University Press. pp. 323–324.
- "Lascelles, Rt Hon. Sir Frank (Cavendish)". Who Was Who. 1 December 2007.

Diplomatic posts
Preceded by Hussey Vivian	British Agent and Consul-General in Egypt; 1879	Succeeded by Edward Malet
Preceded by Gifford Palgrave	Agent and Consul-General in the Principality of Bulgaria; 1879–1887	Succeeded by Nicholas O'Conor
Preceded by Sir William White	Envoy Extraordinary and Minister Plenipotentiary to His Majesty the King of Roumania; 1887–1892	Succeeded by Sir John Walsham, 2nd Baronet
Preceded by Sir Henry Drummond Wolff	Envoy Extraordinary and Minister Plenipotentiary to the Court of Persia; 1891–1894	Succeeded by Sir Mortimer Durand
Preceded by Sir Robert Morier	British Ambassador to Russia; 1894–1895	Succeeded by Sir Nicholas O'Conor
Preceded by Sir Edward Malet	British Ambassador to Germany; 1895–1907	Succeeded by Sir Edward Goschen
