= Arthur Johnston (poet) =

Scottish poet and physician

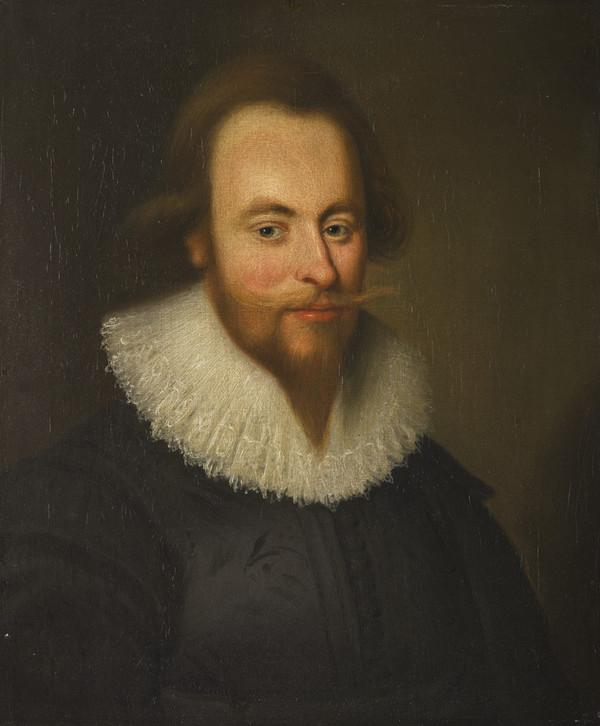
Arthur Johnston, by James Wales

Arthur Johnston (c.1579–1641) was a Scottish poet and physician. He was born in Caskieben (later renamed Keithhall) near Inverurie in Aberdeenshire. His father, Sir George Johnston, was an Aberdeenshire laird, and his mother Christian Forbes was the daughter of Lord Forbes.

Johnston is thought to have begun his university studies at one, or both, of the colleges at the University of Aberdeen, but around 1608 he went to Italy and received an M.D. at Padua in 1610. Afterwards he lived at Sedan, Principality of Sedan as professor at the Academy of Sedan, in the company of the exiled Andrew Melville, and in 1619 was in practice in Paris. He appears to have returned to Scotland about the time of James VI's death in 1625, and to have been in Aberdeen in about 1628. He met William Laud in Edinburgh at the time of Charles I's Scottish coronation (1633). In that year, he had published a volume entitled Cantici Salomonis paraphrasis poetica, which, dedicated to Charles I, brought him to Laud's notice.

Johnston was encouraged by Laud in his literary efforts, possibly as a strike against George Buchanan's reputation as a Latin poet. Johnston was appointed rector of King's College, Aberdeen, in June 1637. Four years later he died at Oxford, on his way to London at Laud's invitation.

Johnston left more than ten works, all in Neo-Latin. Only two of these, published in the same year, are notable: (a) his version of the Psalms (Psalmorum Davidis paraphrasis poetica et canticorum evangelicorum, Aberdeen, 1637), and (b) his anthology of contemporary Latin verse by Scottish poets (Deliciae poetarum Scotorum huius aevi illustrium, Amsterdam, 1637).

The full version of the Psalms was the result of Laud's encouragement. It was for some time a strong rival of Buchanan's work, though not superior to the latter. The Deliciae, in two small thick volumes of 699 and 575 pages, was a patriotic effort in imitation of the various volumes (under a similar title) which had been popular on the Continent during the second decade of the century. The volumes are dedicated by Johnston to John Scot of Scotstarvet, at whose expense the collected works were published after Johnston's death, at Middelburg (1642). Selections from his own poems occupy pages 439-647 of the first volume, divided into three sections, Parerga, Epigrammata and Musae Aulicae.

He published a volume of epigrams at Aberdeen in 1632. In these pieces he shows himself at his best. His sacred poems, which had appeared in the Opera (1642), were reprinted by Lauder in his Poetarum Scotorum musae sacrae (1739). The earliest lives are by Lauder and Benson (in Psalmi Davidici, 1741). Ruddiman's Vindication of Mr George Buchanan's Paraphrase (1745) began a pamphlet controversy regarding the merits of the rival poets.

== Family ==
His niece Isobel Johnston married Peter Blackburn, Bishop of Aberdeen.

== See also ==
- Scottish literature

Academic offices
Preceded by Unknown	Rector of King's College, Aberdeen; 1637 - ?	Succeeded by Unknown
