= Monaco villas =

Residential architecture

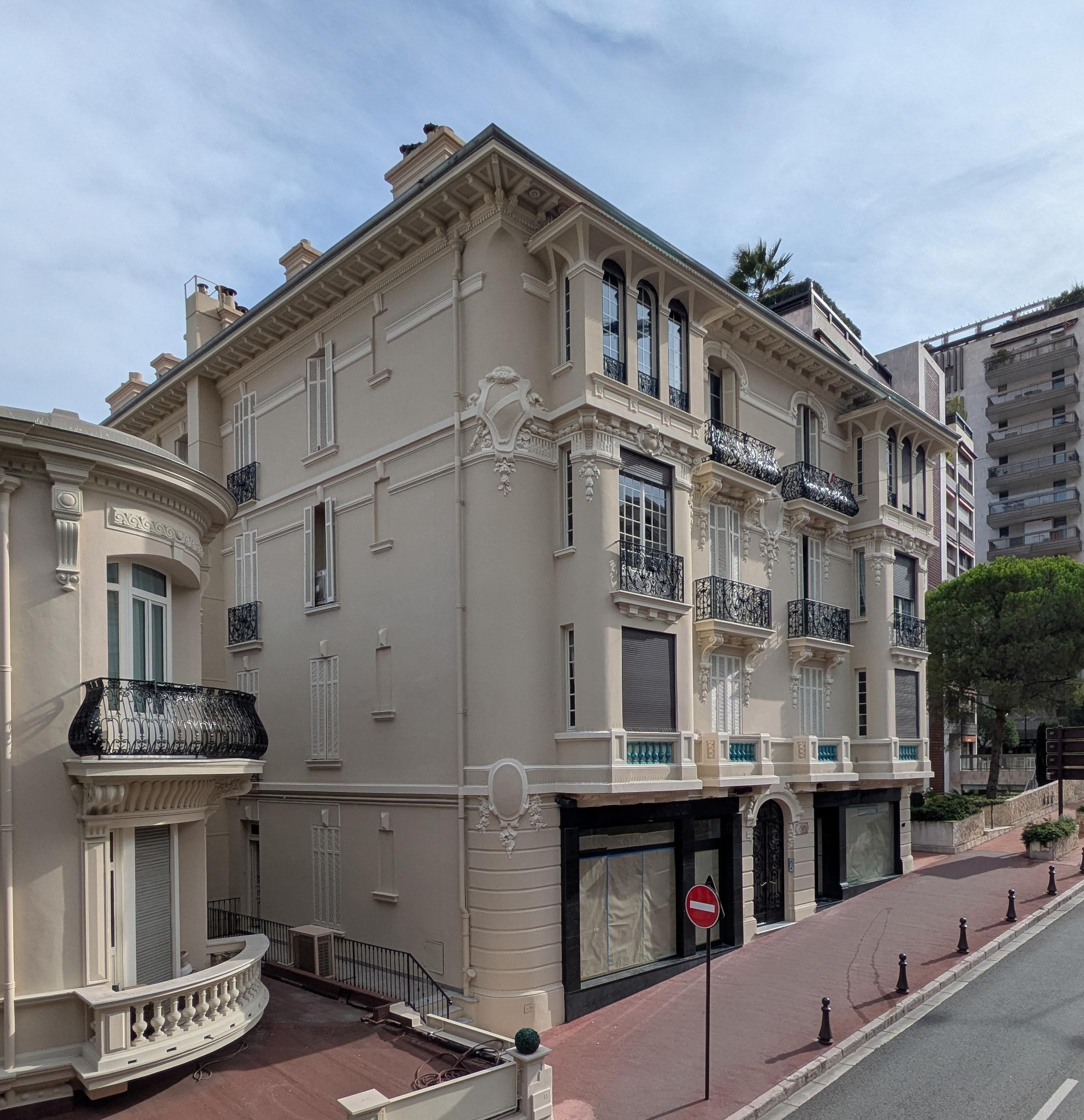
Villa Claude

The historical villas of Monaco represent a significant example of residential architecture. Originally seen as symbols of Belle Epoque luxury, they were once emblematic of the Principality itself. However, by the 1950s they were viewed by Monaco's Consultative Committee on Public Works as a social anachronism. While recent years have seen a renewed appreciation within the Principality for villa architecture, the number of historic villas remaining declines each year. In 1954 the Principality possessed 688 villas; only a small fraction of that number still survive.

== Heritage and its recognition ==
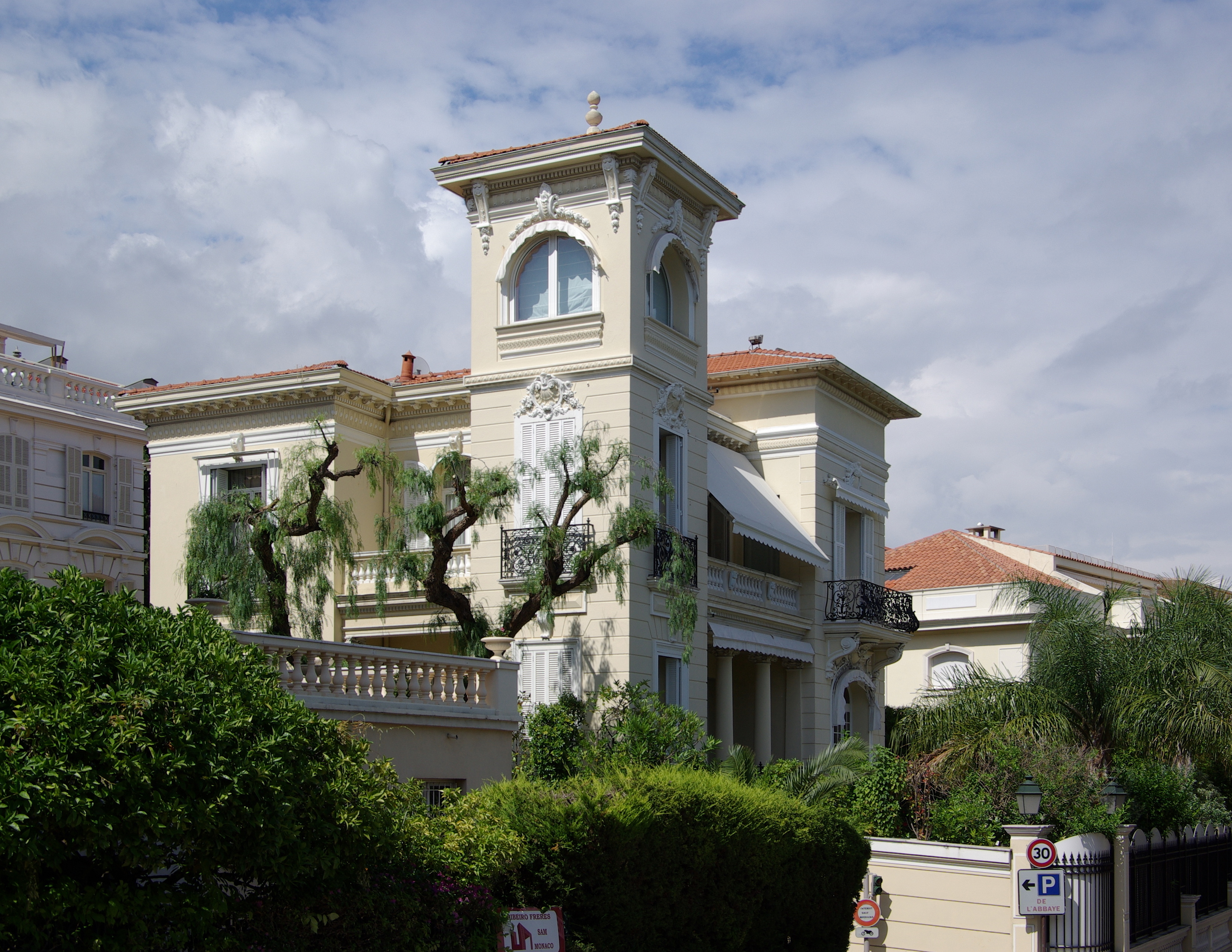
Villa Blanchy in Monaco-Ville

The urban history of Monaco and its villas has, until recently, been subject to poor documentation and archiving. As of 2016, Monaco still had no official preservation laws governing historic buildings.

In 1960 Prince Rainier III established the Monaco Economic Development Corporation to attract new business to the Principality. It was successful in this, but the influx of new investors and workers resulted in a wave of demolitions of Belle Epoque villas to enable the construction of apartments and new hotels.

Following major development in the 1970s, Prince Rainier III banned high rise development in the Principality. However, his successor, Prince Albert II, overturned the Sovereign Order. This, and a further influx of new residents, accelerated the destruction of the architectural heritage of single family villas for new luxury apartments. Demands for affordable public housing led to further villa demolitions. In 2013, an official publication documenting the urban history of the Principality called it a place where "architecture is temporary".

In a nation where public dissent is rare, there was significant criticism of the destruction. The 2013 demolition of the Art Deco Sporting d'Hiver ("Winter Sporting") Club building, and the rotunda of the Hôtel de Paris and its 1900 extensions, caused further dismay, and the establishment of protest group "Monaco Patrimoine", whose leader was quoted as saying: "Monaco is destroying, without scruples, villas from the Belle Epoque…Monaco is losing its identity", and it was termed "a genocide of memories".

In 2015, a major row broke out between the Government and the elected National Council over the demolition of the picturesque Belle Epoque-style 1931 apartment building Le Palais de la Plage (37 Avenue Princesse Grace – originally Boulevard des Bas-Moulins), which sat on the beachfront, and was replaced by an apartment building of the same name. The President of the Cultural and Heritage Mission of the National Council, Daniel Boéri, termed the demolition "brutal", and that Monegasque citizens were being treated by the Government as "children incapable of reason". While a heritage law and Heritage Institute was still in planning, he said: "That we are still at this point in 2015 is breathtaking... The example of the Palais de la Plage is a perfect illustration of its absolute necessity."

In 2015, it was revealed that Monaco state officials had, in a town planning document, identified 93 'remarkable' buildings and 29 'remarkable' facades worth preserving. However, these are to be re-evaluated on a case-by-case basis. The list also offered no guarantee of protection and was criticised for its major absences, including entire streets, and the Hotel de Paris, the Sporting d'Hiver, and the Hermitage.

== Significant losses ==
- 2009 – three villas for construction of the Odeon Tower apartment tower, including "Villa Le Pavillon", 34 Avenue de l'Annonciade.
- 2011 – Villa du Royan and Villa Rignon at 12 and 14 Rue Bel Respiro for apartments.
- 2013 – six villas in rue des Giroflées: 1a "Villa La Lucioles", 7 "Villa Mancoz", 8 "Villa Les Panoramas", 10 "Villa Lisette", 12 "Villa Le Clos Fleuri" and 14 "Villa La Thébaïde"; demolished for "Les Giroflées" apartment tower, at 1 Rue des Giroflées. "Villa Unda Maris" (originally "Villa Saint Martin"), Avenue Saint Martin; demolished for apartments of the same name.
- 2014 – six villas in a triangular site bordered by Rue des Agaves and Rue Augustin Vento for the ''Stella'' apartments and offices, 6 Rue Augustin Vento. The villas were "Andrée Renée", "Alberte," "Félicité" "Andrée Jeanne," "Marie Angèle" and "Guidetta". Villa Esméralda, 15 Avenue de la Costa for a new synagogue.
- 2015 – two villas, "Les Cigognes" and "Villa Linotte", and an annex to the latter called "Pavilion". Demolished for Les Cigognes apartments, 17 Rue Louis Auréglia. Villa Del Sol, 5 Avenue Saint Roman.
- 2016 – two villas: Villa Ida, 6 boulevard Rainier III, and Villa des Platanes, 2 rue Plati, plus two Belle Epoque apartment buildings "Cedars" and "Larches" at 4 and 6 rue Plati for the Villa Ida apartment project.
- 2017 – "Villa Carmelha", 12 Avenue Saint Roman for "Villa Carmelha" apartments; villa at 29 Rue Plati for "Soleil Du Midi" apartments, offices and retail.; four villas, "Les Myrtes" 2 Louis-Aureglia, "Villa Ciel Bleu" 2 Sainte-Dévote staircase; "Saphir Cottage" and "Villa Maria" 24 and 26 Boulevard Rainier lll, for three replacements "Sapphire","Diamond, "Rubis" and apartments "Rosier Sauvage". "Villa Roma", 13 rue Bel Respiro/18 rue Bellevue, for a diocesan house.
- 2019 – Villa Les Aigles, Avenue d'Ostende: destruction and rebuild of an historic villa. Villa Augustine, 9 Bel Respiro and Villa Palazzino, 11 Bel Respiro, for an eight-storey apartment block named Villa Palazzino.

== New villa development ==
- 2014 – "Villas du Sporting": three curvilinear villas on the Monte Carlo Sporting peninsula for the Société des bains de mer. Designed for long-term premium rental. Situated on the sea front, but set within a grove of Aleppo pines enhanced with citrus trees, Canary Island palms, pittosporum tobira and mastic trees. Architects: Christian Curau and Laurent Gire; landscape designer, Jean Mus.
- 2017 – "Villa Troglodyte", 21 avenue Hector Otto, cnr rue Honoré Labande. Unique cave-style villa on one of the last unbuilt rocks between the Ligurian and the Escorial, that was previously home to a bat colony.
- 2025 – "Anse du Portier", the new neighbourhood being built by reclaimed land will feature ten new villas, of which seven are directly facing the sea.

== List of historic and notable villas ==
Surviving villas are listed in boldfont; those known to have been demolished are in plainfont. Those identified as "remarkable" by the state (see above) are indicated with an asterisk.* Note: new apartment/office constructions are often bestowed the same names as the villas they replaced.

AVENUE L'ANNONCIADE

- 28 Château de l'Annonciade – the oldest house in Monaco, constructed 1737, in the style of a feudal crenellated castle, and set within a notable garden. Demolished 1975, and its wall also realigned. Replaced by the development 'Le Point De Jour'.
- 29 Villa Marcelle – Balconied Belle Epoque. Demolished 2015. Replaced by state-owned apartments.
- 34 Villa Le Pavillon – Demolished for Tour Odeon apartment tower.

AVENUE CARLOTTA (A private road in the La Rousse quarter that is no longer in existence, having been subsumed by development.)

- Villa Carlotta – A very large classical mansion on an immense arcaded garden terrace, constructed 1883, and demolished 1965. Replaced by the apartment blocks Périgord 1 and 11, 6 Lacets Saint-Léon.

AVENUE DE LA COSTA

- 2 Villa Minerva – Rented by painter Francis Bacon.
- 10 Villa Pax – Constructed 1883; features a rooftop colonnaded dome pavilion.
- 11 Villa Walewska – A magnificent towered villa set within an immense garden on a high-walled terrace, and one of the showpieces of Monaco. Its gardens were opened to the public. Constructed for Hippolyte Auguste Marinoni, inventor of the rotary printing press. Renamed 1889 'Villa Puslowska' by Count Puslowska, and renamed again 1948 as 'La Villa Rose de France' by Edouard Rothschild. Demolished 1952, and replaced by apartments 'Palais Rose de France'.
- 11 Villa De M. Dusautoy – large three storey villa on a high stone walled terrace.
- 13 Villa Costa – Large attractive Mediterranean style residence.
- 15 Villa Esméralda – Large plain classical villa circa 1887. Converted into a synagogue with dome at its rear. Demolished 2014 and replaced by a new synagogue.
- 17 Villa Graziella – Belle Epoque.
- 19 Villa Bijou – Summer home of Baroness Orczy. Demolished 1990s. Replaced by office block of the same name.
- 31 Le Saint Michel*

AVENUE DE GRANDE BRETAGNE (previously AVENUE DES FLEURS)

- 2 Villa Belgica – Richly decorated Belle Epoque, which has lost its egg-shaped cupola.
- 4 & 6 – Villa Riviera Palace Four storey highly decorated Beaux-Arts villas.
- 5 Villa Constantine – a block combining three impressive classical villas, constructed 1889. Demolished 1974, and replaced by the apartment block 'Les Floralies'.
- 29 Villa Les Mimosas – 1880. Demolished 1995 and replaced by apartments named 'Villa Mimosa'.

AVENUE PRINCESSE GRACE (previously BOULEVARD DES BAS-MOULINS)

- 17 Villa Sauber – Grand Belle Epoque. One of the showpieces of Monaco. Currently houses one section of the New National Museum of Monaco.
- 35 Villa Suka Hati – Demolished 1976. Large almost-fortress structure with terrace, originally on the beach. Limewashed red, hence its nickname 'Villa Rouge'. Rented by painter Francis Bacon 1947–9.
- Villas du Sporting – Monte-Carlo Sporting peninsula. Three modern curvilinear villas, Numbers 1,2 and 3; 2014, architects Christian Curau and Laurent Gire; landscaper Jean Mus.

AVENUE DE LA MADONE

- 4 Le Metropole*

AVENUE D'OSTENDE

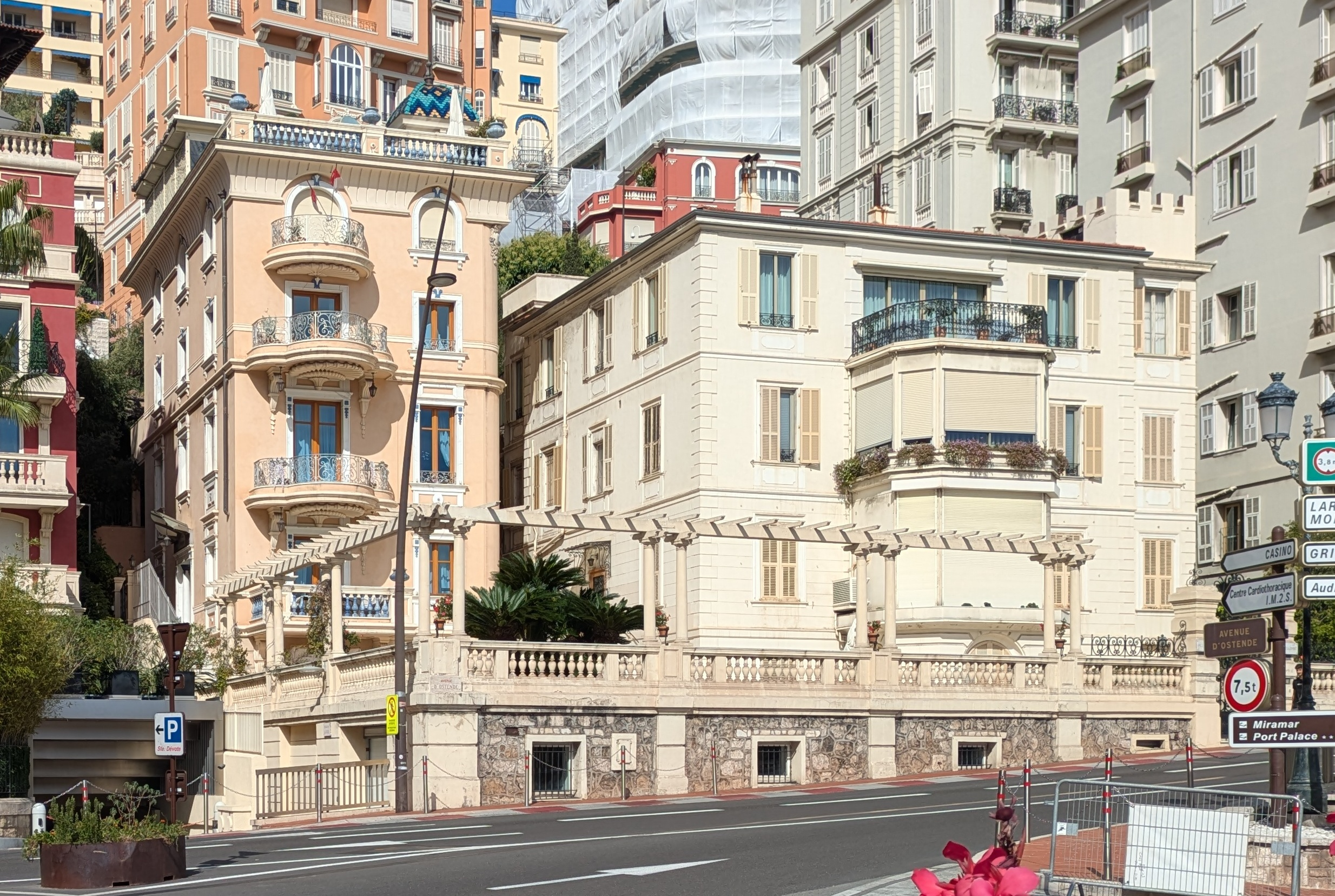
Villa Montjoie (left) and Villa Colombe (right)

- 3 Villa Montjoie – 1900–10. Four storey balconied Belle Epoque style with roof terrace. Renovated 2003.
- 5 Villa Colombe
- 8 Villa de la Géronstère
- 15 Villa Les Aigles – ("The Eagles") – Exceptionally large towered Belle Epoque villa, and once a signature building of Monaco. In the 1980s, the garden was built over to enable the insertion of offices along the frontage. In 2019, the villa almost completely demolished and rebuilt in an enlarged footprint in generic form to enable greater floorspace for its owner, a bank.
- Villa Violette – Two storey neo-classical villa set within a very large terraced garden. Residence of Henri Wagatha, brother-in-law of François Blanc.

AVENUE DU PORT

- 1 et 3* Façades only

AVENUE ROQUEVILLE

- 2 Villa Le Nid – Immense and impressive villa with large conservatory and garden, constructed 1889. Demolished 1953. The home of Sir Frederick Johnston, and where Edward VII stayed when visiting the principality.

AVENUE SAINT CHARLES

- 3 Villa Les Lierres*
- 8 Presbytère*
- 8A Eglise Saint Charles*

AVENUE SAINT LAURENT

- 1 Maison*
- 2 Maison Bregnat*
- 3 Villa de L'Insernia*
- 5 Villa Parana*
- 7 Villa Barbarin* – 1900; architect Théodore Gastaud

AVENUE SAINT MICHEL

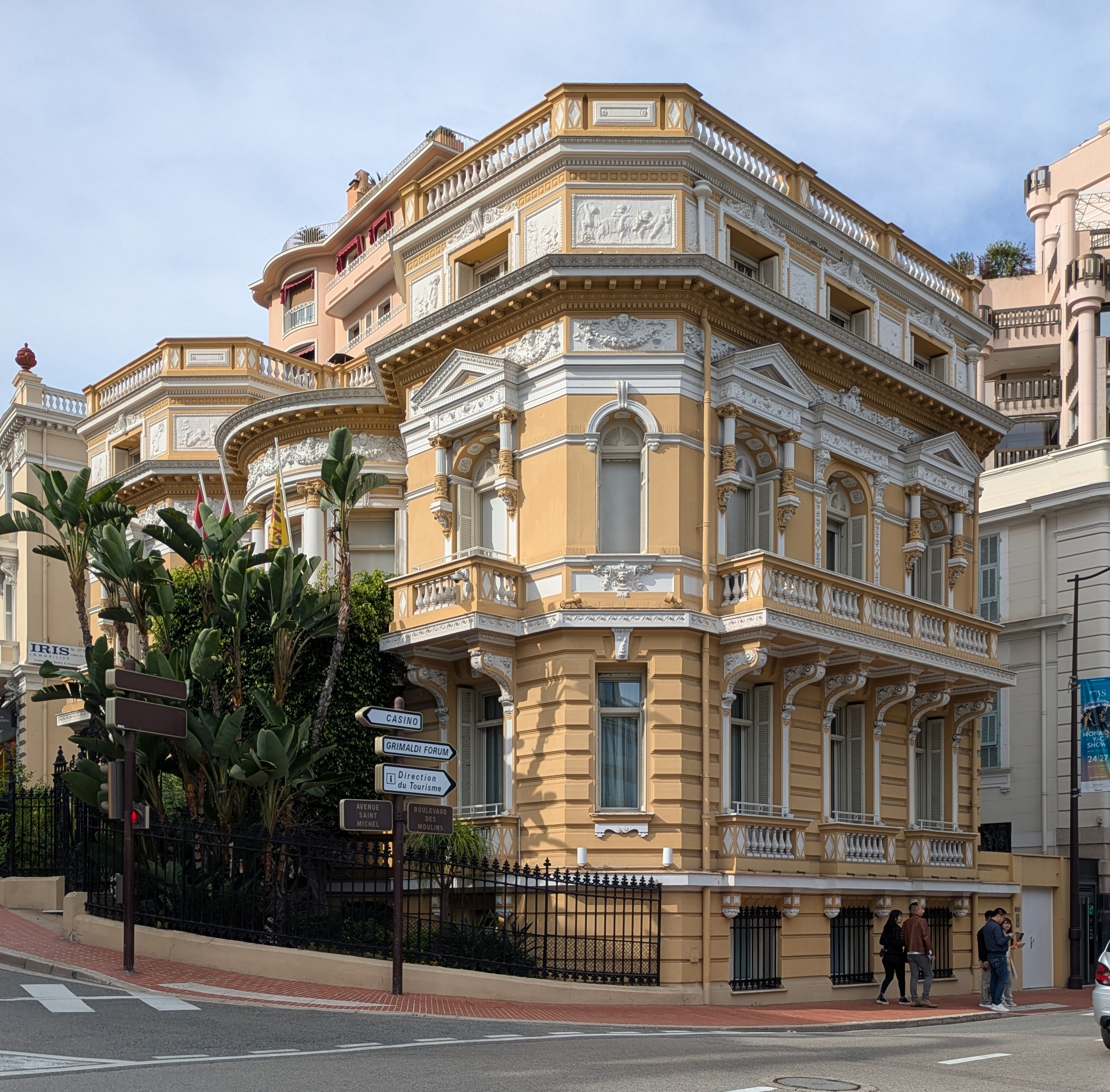
Villa Miraflores

- 2 Villa Miraflores* – 1908. Replaced Villa Souvenance, 1891, architect André Oscar.
- 3 Villa Gardenia* – 1909, architect Francois Médecin.
- 5 Villa Claude* – 1912, architect Fulbert Aureglia.
- 6 Villa Celine* – Four storey balconied Belle Epoque.

AVENUE SAINT MARTIN

- Villa Clos Saint-Martin – Large neo-classical style. Official residence of Princess Stéphanie of Monaco.
- Villa Clos Saint-Pierre – Large three storey towered Belle Epoque style with garden. Official Monaco residence of Princess Caroline of Hanover.
- 11 Villa Unda Maris – A classical residence with balcony, the facade highlighted with ionic pilasters. Originally named 'Villa Saint Martin', at which time it possessed an impressive formal garden, later partly subsumed by an annex. The back of the villa was embraced by the courtyard of l'École du Rocher (the School of the Rock). The school was replaced in 2010 by the National Council building which extended over the former courtyard to closely abut and overlook the villa, compromising its aspect. The villa was demolished in 2013 and replaced by an apartment building of the same name.

AVENUE SAINT ROMAN

- 5 Villa Del Sol – Art Moderne style, set within a very large stone-walled garden: an almost unique survival in the Principality on both counts. Demolished 2015. Replaced by apartment block U Pavayùn.
- 7 Château de Saint-Roman – Enormous and impressive villa with crenellated tower, demolished 1976.
- 12 Villa Carmelha – modern villa in Mediterranean style on massive stone garden terrace fronting Boulevard d'Italie. Demolished 2017 for the Carmelha apartments.

BOULEVARD DE BELGIQUE

- 2 Villa Belgica – Three storey Beaux Arts style villa with egg-shaped dome. Dome removed and replaced with two ill-matching additional storeys.
- 22 Villa Boutons d'Or – ("Gold Buttons") 1921, architect Charles Bernasconi. Deep eaved Mediterranean style.
- 26 Villa Bon Accord – Highly picturesque three storey neo-classical villa with arcaded bow front.
- 33 Villa Marie*
- 35 Villa Belgica*
- Villa El Mandar* and 37b*

BOULEVARD DE FRANCE

- 8 Villa Favorite*
- 10 Villa Helios*
- 12 Villa Albina*
- 14 Villa Beausoleil*
- 16 Maison Florent Andrei*
- 18 Castel Florence*
- 24 Villa St. Joseph

BOULEVARD D'ITALIE

- 25 Villa Loretta –
- ? Villa Marjolaine – Boulevard d'Italie.(?)
- 3 Villa Italia – Originally "Villa Dora". Highly formal Neo-Classical/Mediterranean villa with deep eaves and extended window casements.
- 5 Villa Marie-Thérèse –
- 7 Sunny Villa – Replaced by "Les Abeilles" apartments.
- 9 Villa Les Abeilles – ("The Bees"). Originally "Villa Marie-Hortense"; renamed 1910 "Villa Mon Drapu". Monaco home of Sir Rupert Clarke, 2nd baronet. Demolished. Replaced by office and apartment tower of the same name on numbers 7 and 9.
- 11 Villa Paulette* – Once home to Sir John Woodroffe.
- 15 Villa Juliette* – Four storey balconied neo-classical. (Fourth storey a possible later addition.)
- 17 Villa La Rousse* – Three storey balconied neo-classical.
- 18 Villa Beaulieu* – Bijou Neo-Classical five-storey villa with roof terrace.
- 19 Villa Ribéri* – Striking Belle Epoque building of deep eaves and dramatic extended and peaked upper window canopies. No garden.
- 20 Palais Belvedère*
- 21 Villa Elise*
- 35 Villa Le Rêve* – ("The Dream") Large Neo-Classical villa constructed 1888, set within a large garden.
- 37 Villa Marie* – Restrained three-storey Neo-Classical style. Interior reconstructed 2012.
- 38 Villa Guitou*
- 44? Villa Primerose –
- 56 Villa Antoinette

BOULEVARD DU JARDIN EXOTIQUE (previously BOULEVARD DE L'OBSERVATOIRE)

- 37 Palais du Midi – Highly picturesque five storey balconied Belle Epoque apartment building with rondel corners.
- 40 Villa Blanche – Five storey Belle Epoque villa with large raised terrace. Sitting on top of 20 Rue J.F. Bosio.
- 42 ter Les Orangers*
- 56 Villa Paloma – Formerly 'Villa Coquette'. Built for Edward N. Dickerson. 1913, architect unknown, garden designed by Octave Godard. Houses one section of the New National Museum of Monaco.
- 57 Villa Ispahan – Originally 'Villa Danichgah' ("The Poet's House"); renamed 1986. Highly exotic looking villa in Moorish style; 1910. One of the showpieces of Monaco. For the Persian Prince Arfa Mirza Riza Khan, advisor to Prince Albert I.
- 59 Villa Alexandre*
- 61 Villa Grace* - A Venetian inspired private residence.
- 67 Villa Thérèse – Demolished 2016 for five storey office development.
- 75 Villa Marie-Antoinette – Belle Epoque style with large striking curved pediment.

BOULEVARD DES MOULINS

- 1 Immeuble banque BNP*
- 2a Villa Bromar – Belle Epoque style with large decorative ceramic facade elements.
- 12 Villa La Lestra – Three storey classical style pavilion villa with mansard roof within a large terraced garden. From 1951 home of novelist, playwright, and filmmaker Marcel Pagnol. Demolished 2008 for an apartment building of the same name.
- 14 Villa Ménésini* –14 Boulevard des Moulins. Belle Epoque apartment building.
- 16 Hotel du Louvre*
- 17 Villa Helene*
- 18 Villa Les Acacias*
- 19 Villa Marcel*
- 20 Casa Emma* – Belle Epoque apartments.
- 21 Villa Saint Laurent*
- 22 San Carlo*
- 24 Villa Le Lotus*
- 26 Palais Albany*
- 27 Le Radium*
- 37 – Three storey neo-classical with later three storey addition.
- 39bis Palais Miramare* – Three storey balconied neo-classical.
- 41 Casa Bella – Grand Belle Epoque apartment building.
- Villa Zlotnicki – Located 300 metres from the Casino. Originally residence of Count Zlotnicki, later M. Dussautoy who enhanced the showpiece gardens (including artificial caves), which were open one day a week.

BOULEVARD PRINCESSE CHARLOTTE (previously BOULEVARD DU NORD)

- 1 Villa Trentenario – Large four storey Neo-classical villa with deep arcaded balconies set within large front garden. Demolished 2007. Replaced in 2009 by Villa Les Gaumates apartments.
- 4 Villa Olga – Constructed 1897, set within a large garden.
- 5 Villa Du Royan – Rear entrance. Refer to 12 Rue Bel Respiro.
- 6 Villa Byron – Four storey neoclassical, one side with large oval bow front. Originally a hotel.
- 7 Villa Jacqueline – Originally "Villa Blume".
- 9 Villa Myrelingues* – Belle Epoque.
- 19 Lamartine*
- 23 Villa Alice*
- 24 Est Ouest (Villa de L'Est – Constructed 1830, demolished 1981.)
- 25 Villa Paola*
- 26 Villa Saïd*
- 27 Villa des Fleurs*
- 28 Le Forum*
- 29 Villa La Belle Vie* – Originally called Villa Louis. 1893 Neo-Classical/Belle Epoque apartment building. Renovated and renamed 2012.

BOULEVARD RAINIER III (originally BOULEVARD DE L'OUEST)

- 1 Villa Irma Chemin de la Rousse*
- 1 Villa Josephine*
- 2 Maison Riberi Chemin du Ténao*
- 5 Villa Ida – 5 Boulevard Rainier III. Large, Neo-Classical style. Demolished 2016 for Villa Ida apartments project, together with Villa de Platanes and the apartment buildings "Cedars" and "Larches" at 2, 4 and 6 rue Plati.
- 10 Villa Emmanuel – Picturesque four storey plus tower neo-classical villa on raised terrace.
- 11 Villa Trotty* – Large Neo-Classical villa.
- 12 Villa Hebe – Neo-classical villa.
- 14 Les Cigognes – ("The Storks") 14 Boulevard Rainier III. Demolished 2014, together with Villa Linotte, for an apartment and office development Les Cigognes.
- 14 bis Saphir Cottage - Large plain-front balconied villa with roof garden. Demolished.
- 16 Villa Des Roches - Picturesque villa, demolished 1994 for "Residence Azur".
- 18 Villa Magali - Attractive Italianate towered villa, constructed 1890. Demolished 1981 and replaced by apartments "Le Soleil d'Or".
- 24 Saphir Cottage – Highly important and striking Belle Epoque villa; 1904. featuring deep eaves and a facade decorated with shell and other motifs. Demolished 2017. Replaced by substitute.
- 26 Villa Maria – Highly significant and prominent three storey villa in hacienda style with slightly elevated tower. Demolished 2017. Replaced by eight apartments.
- 27 Villa Tara – Bijou picturesque balconied neo-classical two-storey villa set in a garden with a separate raised terrace area.
- 29 Villa Des Garets – Striking towered villa constructed 1889. By architect Eugène Marquet.

BOULEVARD DE SUISSE

- 1 Palais Armida (Villa Indiana – 1899. Demolished 1966.)
- 2 Villa Byron –
- 3 Villa des Gaumates – Three storey neo-classical cliff-edge villa Grecian elements and facade mosaics. Garden terrace on second storey.
- 5 Villa Peirera – 1890. Demolished 1950 and replaced by apartments of the same name.
- 6 Villa? –
- 11 Villa de Rome –
- 14 Villa Le Sphinx – Three-storey neo-classical style with tower.
- 15 Villa Sevigne – Undistinguished neo-classical apartments. Possible replacement for earlier villa.
- 16 Villa Girasole – Large and important two-storey neo-classical residence constructed in 1889, set within a large garden. Internal features include an impressive foyer and double-width staircase.
- 17 Villa Le Rose de France – Monaco residence of banker Baron Maurice Ephrussi and his wife Charlotte-Béatrice née de Rothschild. Extensively and sympathetically renovated in the Moorish style for the Baroness by architect Albert Laprade between 1928 and 1930. Demolished. Replaced by apartment block.
- 19 Le Schuylkill (Villa Soleil)
- 20 Le Saint André (Villa Des Colonnes – Large and impressive neo-classical residence with columns set within a large garden. Demolished 1977.)
- 21 Chateau de Plaisance – Wide, single storey neo-classical villa constructed in approximately 1885. Demolished 1991. Replaced by apartment block.
- 24 Villa Colibri – ("Villa Hummingbird") – Three storey classical villa set within a garden.
- 27 Villa Roqueville – Large Neo-Classical villa set in garden, with later extension over part of the original garden. Currently headquarters of the Monaco branch of the Red Cross.
- 29 Villa des Garets – Picturesque balconied Belle Epoque style apartment building.

BOULEVARD DU TENAO

- 5 Villa Nocturne – 1880. Originally "Villa Mario-Louis". Renamed 1936. Renovated 2012.

DESCENTE DU LARVOTTO

- 1 Maison Mencarelli - Built in 1898
- 11 Villa Les Grillons*

ESCALIER SAINT-DÉVOTE

- 2 Villa Le Lys – ("The Lily") home (1920-1929) of Lillie Langtry, Lady de Bathe. Originally called "Villa Germaine", then "Roc Fleuri", and later "Ciel Bleu". Demolished 2017. Replaced by substitute.

PLACE DUE MARCHÉ

- North façade only*

PLACE DES MOULINS

- Palais de L'Aurore – Spectacular Beaux-Arts apartment building.

ROUTE DE LA MOYENNE CORNICHE

- 24-6 Villa Frontalière – ("Villa Border") Belle Epoque villa with later villas built in former large gardens (four structures in all). Rented by painter Francis Bacon, but its sea views are now blocked by an apartment tower.

RUE AUGUSTIN VENTO

- 8 Villa Marie Angèle – Demolished 2014 together with five other villas for Stella apartment and office project.

RUE BEL RESPIRO

- 2 La Malmaison – Two-storey neoclassical.
- 4 Villa Victoria – Three-storey restrained neo-classical. Refurbished 2000. (There are also "Villa Victoria" apartments at 8 Boulevard Rainier III (originally: Boulevard de l'Ouest), constructed 2013, which possibly replaced an earlier "Villa Victoria" on the site.)
- 5 Villa Petrouchka* – Magnificent Belle Epoque villa with columned entrance, with large front terrace (original heavily planted terrace garden now removed), with impressive stone staircased rear entrance at 12 Rue Bellvue.
- 9 Villa Augustine – Two-story neo-classical set on a high stone and balustrade terrace garden. Demolished 2019 together with No.11 for Villa Palazzino apartments.
- 11 Villa Palazzino – Three storey neo-classical with half bow front, set on a high stone and balustrade terrace garden. Demolished 2019 together with No9 for apartment block of same name.
- 12 Villa du Royan – Large Belle Epoque residence with stone retaining wall fronting the Boulevard with large stone gate piers, with rear entrance and stone retaining wall on Boulevard Princesse Charlotte. Home of Marie Marguerite Beaudenom de Lamaze. (d.1947) Demolished (including wall) 2011. Replaced by apartments.
- 13 Villa Roma – See 18 rue Bel Respiro for information.
- Villa Hollandia – (refer to 22 Rue Bellevue)
- 14 Villa Rignon – Large three storey neo-classical residence with porte en coche entrance, and immense stone retaining wall with rear entrance on Boulevard Princesse Charlotte. Demolished 2011 (including stone wall) for apartments of the same name. Apartments now bear address 29 Boulevard Princesse Charlotte.
- 15 Villa Dryade. Demolished. Once home to writer Kay Boyle. Replaced by apartments of the same name.
- 16 Villa Diana –
- Villa Jacqueline –

RUE BELLEVUE

- 7 Villa Marie Georgette* - Grand villa set on large terrace with immense stone wall.
- 11 Villa Esméralda - formerly Villa Alsacia, a four-story 19th century villa that was demolished in 2020.
- 12 Villa Petrouchka* Rear entrance. Refer to 5 Rue Bel Respiro.
- 13 Villa ? – Grand neo-classical villa set on large terrace with high stone wall.
- 18 Villa Roma – Three storey (two from street) neo-classical with pedimented entrance. Extends to 13 rue Bel Respiro. Demolished 2017 for a diocesan house.
- 22 Villa Hollandia – Four storey (three from street) neo-classical.

RUE COLONEL BELLANDO DE CASTRO

- 1 Villa San Martin - 18th century classic villa, with rooftop views over Fontvieille harbour.

RUE DES AÇORES

- 2* Façades only
- 3* Façades only
- 4* Façades only
- 5* Façades only
- 6* Façades only
- 7* Façades only
- 8* Façades only
- 10* Façades only
- 12* Façades only

RUE DES GENÊTS

- 1 Villa Sainte-Cécile – Demolished 1958. Replaced by Millefiori apartment tower.

RUE DES GIROFLÉES

- 1a Villa Les Lucioles – Constructed 1888; demolished 2013 for "Les Giroflées" apartment tower.
- 2 Villa Les Flots – ("The Waves") 1894, Belle Epoque style; facade features pilasters, medallions, key pendant arches, pediments curved stucco cornices, balconies and a loggia with oriel shell.
- 3 Villa La Mascotte*
- 4 Villa La Vague*
- 6 Villa La Brise
- 7 Villa Mancoz – Constructed 1902, demolished 2013 for "Les Giroflées" apartment tower.
- 8 Villa Les Panoramas – four storey Mediterranean style, on a stone terrace, constructed 1900; demolished 2013 for "Les Giroflées" apartment tower.
- 10 Villa Lisette – Originally "Les Giroflées"; renamed "Villa Léonie" 1926; renamed "Villa Lisette" in 1951. Deep-eaved Mediterranean style, constructed 1910; demolished 2013 for "Les Giroflées" apartment tower.
- 12 Villa Le Clos Fleuri – Originally "Villa Les Géraniums"; Villa Léonie in 1926; Villa Le Clos Fleuri 1953. Two storey, deep-eaved Mediterranean style, constructed 1910. Demolished 2013 for "Les Giroflées" apartment tower.
- 14 Villa La Thébaïde – Renamed "Villa La Dominante" in 1930. Two-storey villa with large front garden and pillared pagoda, constructed 1922; Demolished 2013 for "Les Giroflées" apartment tower.
- 18*
- 20*
- 21*
- 22*
- 23*
- 25*
- 27*
- 30*

RUE DES REMPARTS

- 14 Villa Sirenette - four storey classical villa.

RUE GRIMALDI

- 19 Villa Péronne – 1877, architects Notari and Adjani; modified 1907, architect César Lancette.
- 21 Villa Rosine –
- 25 Rue Grimaldi – Neo-classical four storey balconied apartment building. Demolished 2008. Replaced by Le Monator apartments, 2010.
- 27 Rue Grimaldi – Neo-classical three storey balconied apartment building. Demolished 2008. Replaced by Le Monator apartments, 2010.
- 32* Façades des constructions
- 33 Villa Leopold – Restrained three-storey neo-classical with shallow pediments and detailing.
- 45 Villa Trianon

RUE HUBERT–CLERISSI (previously RUE DES AGAVES)

- ? Villa Andrée Jeanne – Two storey classical villa constructed 1897. Demolished 2014 together with five other villas for Stella apartment and office project.
- 12 Villa Andrée Renée – Four storey balconied Neo-Classical, raised on a terraced podium. Demolished 2014 together with five other villas for Stella apartment and office project.
- 14 Villa Alberte – Highly picturesque three-storey balconied Belle Epoque villa with central projecting front and decorative pediment. Demolished 2014 together with five other villas for Stella apartment and office project.
- 16 Villa Félicité – Four storey neo-classical apartment building. Demolished 2014 together with five other villas for Stella apartment and office project.

RUE HONORÉ LABANDE

- 3 Palais ZigZag*
- 11 Villa Santinella*

RUE DES IRIS

- 4 Villa Beau* Site

RUE LOUIS AURÉGLIA (previously RUE DES MONEGHETTI)

- 2 Les Myrtes – Highly picturesque bijou Belle Epoque. Demolished 2017. Replaced by substitute.
- 8 – Picturesque single storey neo-classical villa with pilasters.
- 15 Villa Marie Laurence –
- 17 Villa Linotte ("Villa Swallow") – Included an annex called "Pavilion". Tall balconied Belle Epoque style with a large front garden with columned arbour. Demolished 2014, together with villa Les Cigognes, for an apartment and office development Les Cigognes.

RUE DE MILLO

- 15* Façades only
- 16 Villa des Pins*
- 24* Façades only
- 26 Villa Georgette* – 1899; architect: Théodore Gastaud.
- 29* Façades only
- 31 Villa Delphine*

RUE DES ORCHIDÉES

- 1 Villa Leonie* – Highly picturesque towered Belle Epoque apartment building.
- 4 Sun Palace*
- 21 Villa Bleue*

RUE PLATI

- 2 Villa des Platanes – ("The Plane Trees") Large two storey, deep-eaved, Mediterranean style with garden. Demolished 2016, together with the Villa Ida, and the plain-front Belle Epoque apartment buildings "Cedars" and "Larches" (with large courtyard garden) at 4 & 6 Rue Plati for the apartment towers of the Villa Ida project.
- 18 Villa Belvedère*
- 29 – four storey balconied villa. Demolished 2017 for "Soleil Du Midi" apartments, offices and retail.
- 30 Villa Quatre Mains* (previously: 30 Le Petit Grain) – 1907, architect Fulbert Auréglia.
- 34 Villa La Vigie*
- 39 Villa Bellevue*
- 41 Maidon Bambusi*
- 41bis El Palacio*
- 43 Villa Le Perchoir
- 47 Garden Palace*
- 49 Villa Du Parc* – 1923, architect Phillippe Gamba.

RUE PRINCESSE CAROLINE

- 2 Maison Fontaine*
- 22 Pavillon*

RUE PRINCESSE FLORESTINE

- 7 Villa Carmen*
- 13 Palais Florestine* – Grand five-storey Belle Epoque.
- 15 Villa ? – Belle Epoque
- 17 Villa? – Neoclassical
- 19 Villa de l'Avenir – Four storey neo-classical.

RUE RÉVÉREND PÈRE LOUIS FROLLA (ex RUE DES ORCHIDEES)

- 16 les Orchidées*
- 27 Loggetta Del Sole* - Small traditional two-story villa.

RUE SUFFREN REYMOND

- 3 Villa Ex Boisset* and 3b*

RUE TERRAZZINI

- 8 Maison Luca*
- 2* Façades only
- 4* Façades only
- 6* Façades only

RUELLE SAINTE-DÉVOTE

- 4 & 6 Villa Lilly Lou
- 5 Villa Blanchy - architect Jean Marquet.
- 10 Villa Nenette - architect Jean Marquet.

UNIDENTIFIED ADDRESSES

- Villa Biovès
- Les Cigales – Four-storey Mediterranean-style with tower.
- Villa Datura –
- Villa Ghompré
- Villa Guidetta – Demolished 2014 together with five other villas for Stella apartment and office project.
- Villa Ravel – five storey hotel.
- Villa du Rocher de Cancale – 22 boulevard du Nord
- Villa Saint-Albert – Large oval four storey pillared neo-classical mansion.

== Notable nearby villas ==
- Le Chateau Malet – Cap D'Ail. Immense Beaux Arts mansion set within 14 acres of gardens. Architect: Hans-Georg Tersling; 1892. For Sir Edward Malet. Later extended. Gardens redesigned by Russell Page.
- Villa Iberia – Cap Ferrat, France. Classical waterfront villa, formerly owned by Prince Ranier II, but sold.
- Roc Agel – farmhouse on 125 acres at Mont Agel, France, purchased by Prince Ranier II in 1957 as a retreat for the Royal Family. Still a working farm.
- Villa La Vigie – ("The Lookout") Pointe de la Veille, France. Belle Epoque villa set within gardens approached via its own private road. Situated just beyond the Monaco border, but owned by the Société des bains de mer de Monaco. Restored by, and a holiday home of Karl Lagerfeld for a decade in the 1990s. Other notable rentees include, in 1909, Daisy, Princess of Pless.

== See also ==
- Architecture of Monaco

== Bibliography ==
- Giordano, Nathalie Rosticher (Ed.)Monacopolis: Architecture, Urban Planning and Urbanisation in Monaco: Projects and Constructions, 1858-2012, NMNM, Monaco 2013.
- Laplace, Pierre Villas Les Anciennes et leurs Hôtes à Monaco, Editions V. Gadoury, Monaco, 2015.
- Laplace, Pierre Les hôtels d'hier & aujourd'hui à Monaco, (2 vols), Editions V. Gadoury, Monaco, 2008 & 2010.
