= Celia Fiennes =

English travel writer (1662–1741)

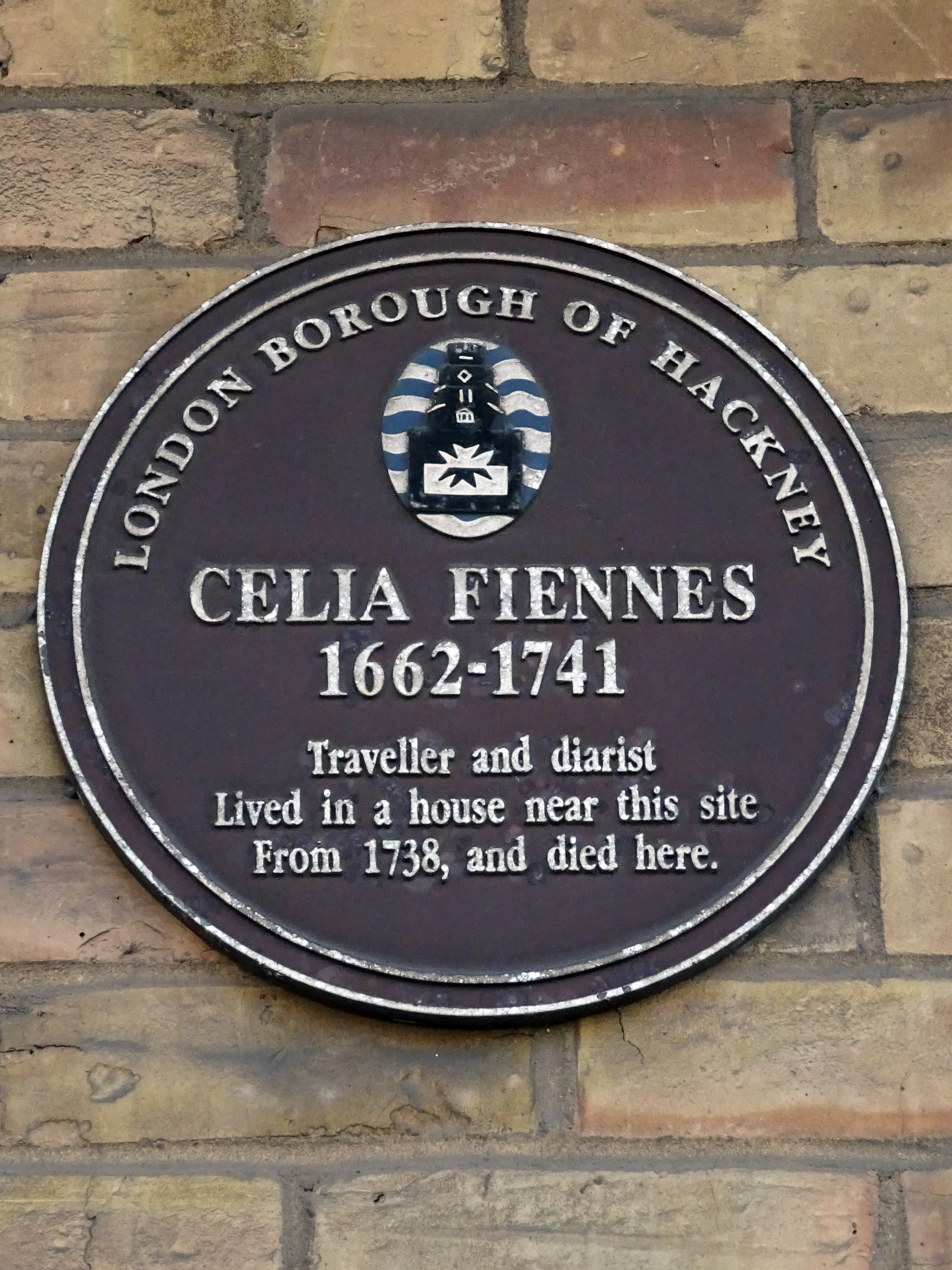
- Memorial plaque in Hackney
- Born: 7 June 1662; Newton Tony, Wiltshire, England
- Died: 10 April 1741 (aged 78); Hackney, England
- Parent(s): Nathaniel Fiennes; Frances Whitehead
- Relatives: William Fiennes, 1st Viscount Saye and Sele (paternal grandfather)

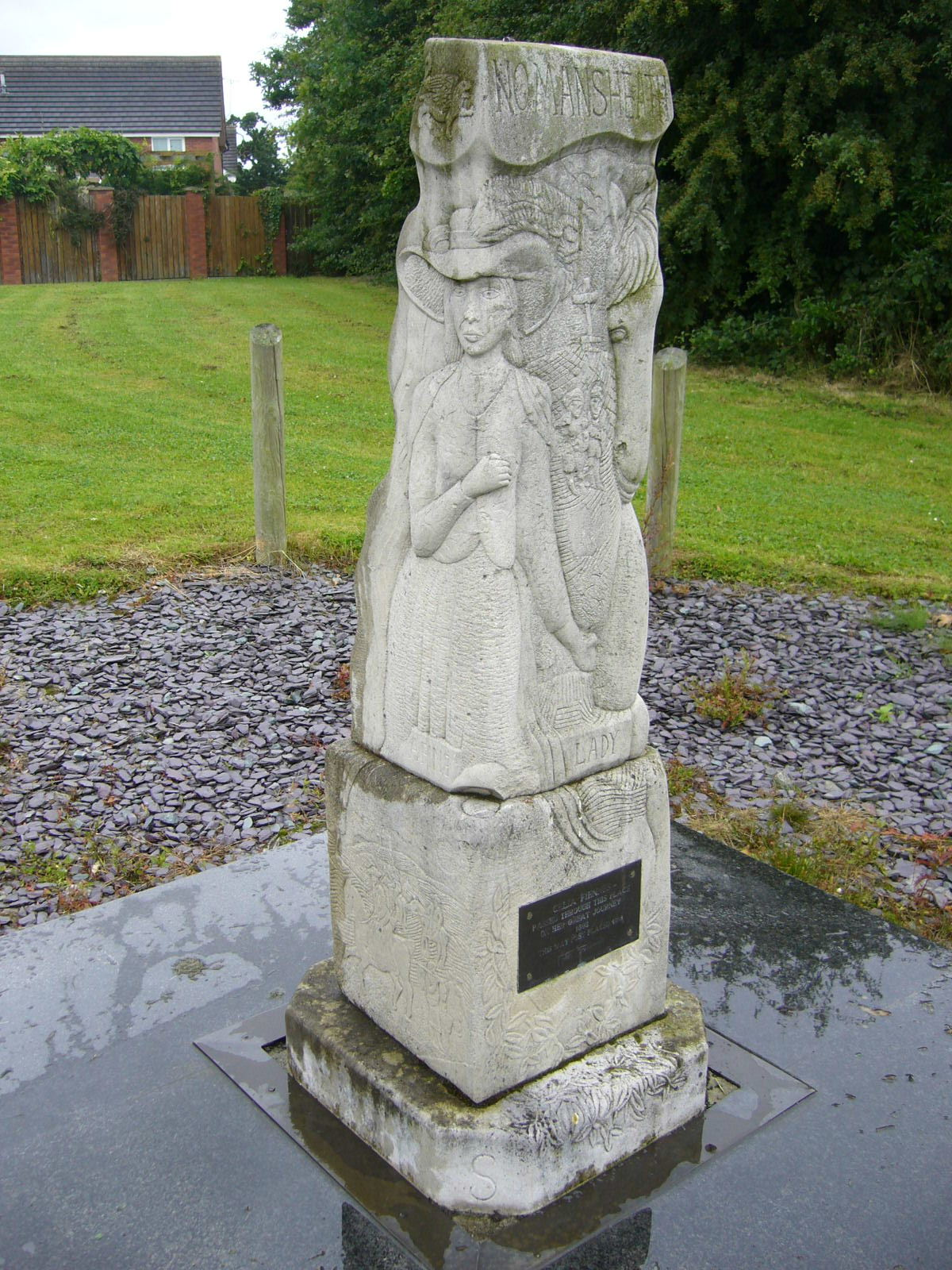
Claimed to be "the only permanent memorial in the whole country to the memory of Celia Fiennes", this "Waymark" stands in No Man's Heath, Cheshire

Celia Fiennes (7 June 1662 – 10 April 1741) was an English traveller and writer. She explored England on horseback at a time when travel for its own sake was unusual, especially for women.

== Early life ==
Born at Newton Tony, Wiltshire, she was the daughter of Nathaniel Fiennes, a politician and in the English Civil War a Parliamentarian colonel, and his second wife, Frances née Whitehead. Nathaniel was in turn the second son of William Fiennes, 1st Viscount Saye and Sele, and father of the 3rd viscount.

== Career ==
=== Pioneering traveller ===
Fiennes never married. In 1691 she moved to London, where she had a married sister. She travelled around England on horseback between 1684 and about 1703, "to regain my health by variety and change of aire and exercise" (Journeys). At this time the idea of travel for its own sake was still novel, and Fiennes was exceptional as an enthusiastic woman traveller. Sometimes she travelled with relatives, but she made her "Great Journey to Newcastle and Cornwall" of 1698 accompanied only by one or two servants. Her travels continued intermittently until at least 1712 and took her through most of England.

=== Tours and memoirs ===
Fiennes worked up her notes into a travel memoir in 1702, which she never published, being intended only for family reading. It provides a vivid portrait of a still largely unenclosed countryside with few and primitive roads, although signposts ("posts and hands pointing to each road with the names of the great towns or market towns that it leads to") were appearing. Robert Southey published extracts in 1812, and the first complete edition appeared in 1888 under the title Through England on a Side Saddle. A scholarly edition called The Journeys of Celia Fiennes was produced by Christopher Morris in 1947. Since then the book has remained in print in various editions.

Fiennes was interested in anything new, in innovations, bustling towns, the newly fashionable spa towns such as Bath and Harrogate, and in commerce. Fiennes's patriotic justification for domestic tourism and her interest in the "production and manufactures of each place" anticipated the genre of "economic tourism", which became formalised with Daniel Defoe's professional and survey-like A Tour through the Whole Island of Great Britain (1724–1726). The economic tourist would become a staple of travel writing throughout the 18th and 19th centuries.

Fiennes saw many of the finest baroque English country houses while they were still under construction. Despite the widespread notion that the habit of visiting "stately homes" set in after the Second World War, many have been accessible to travellers of higher social standing since Fiennes's time if not earlier, and her comments are among the most interesting sources of information about them. At Stonehenge she counted the exact number of stones and at Harrogate visited "the sulphur or stinking spaw". She also clambered over the rocks at Land's End.

== Remembered ==
Fiennes died in Hackney in 1741. Her grave lies in St. Andrew's Churchyard in Newton Tony, Wiltshire.

Her travels formed the subject of a play, Riding England Sidesaddle by Christopher Goulding, which was first performed at the People's Theatre, Newcastle upon Tyne in 1992, starring Andrea Riseborough as the young Celia Fiennes and Gordon Russell as her father.

== See also ==
- "Ride a cock horse to Banbury Cross"
