= Wilbury House =

Country house in Newton Tony, Wiltshire, England

Coordinates: 51.1714°N 1.6843°W

Wilbury House or Wilbury Park is an 18th-century Neo-Palladian country house in the parish of Newton Tony, Wiltshire in South West England, about 8.7 miles (14 km) northeast of Salisbury. It is a Grade I listed building, and the surrounding park and garden are Grade II listed.

The park is immediately north of Newton Toney village, on both banks of the River Bourne, and extends north beyond the house into Cholderton parish.

== Architecture ==
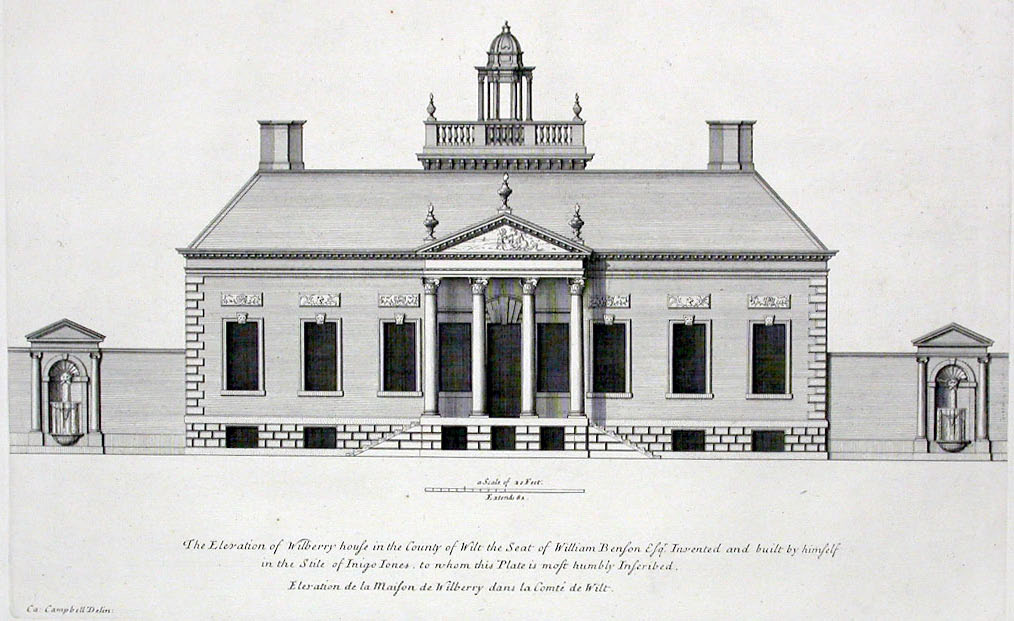
Wilbury House as it appeared originally, folio from Colen Campbell's Vitruvius Britannicus (1715)

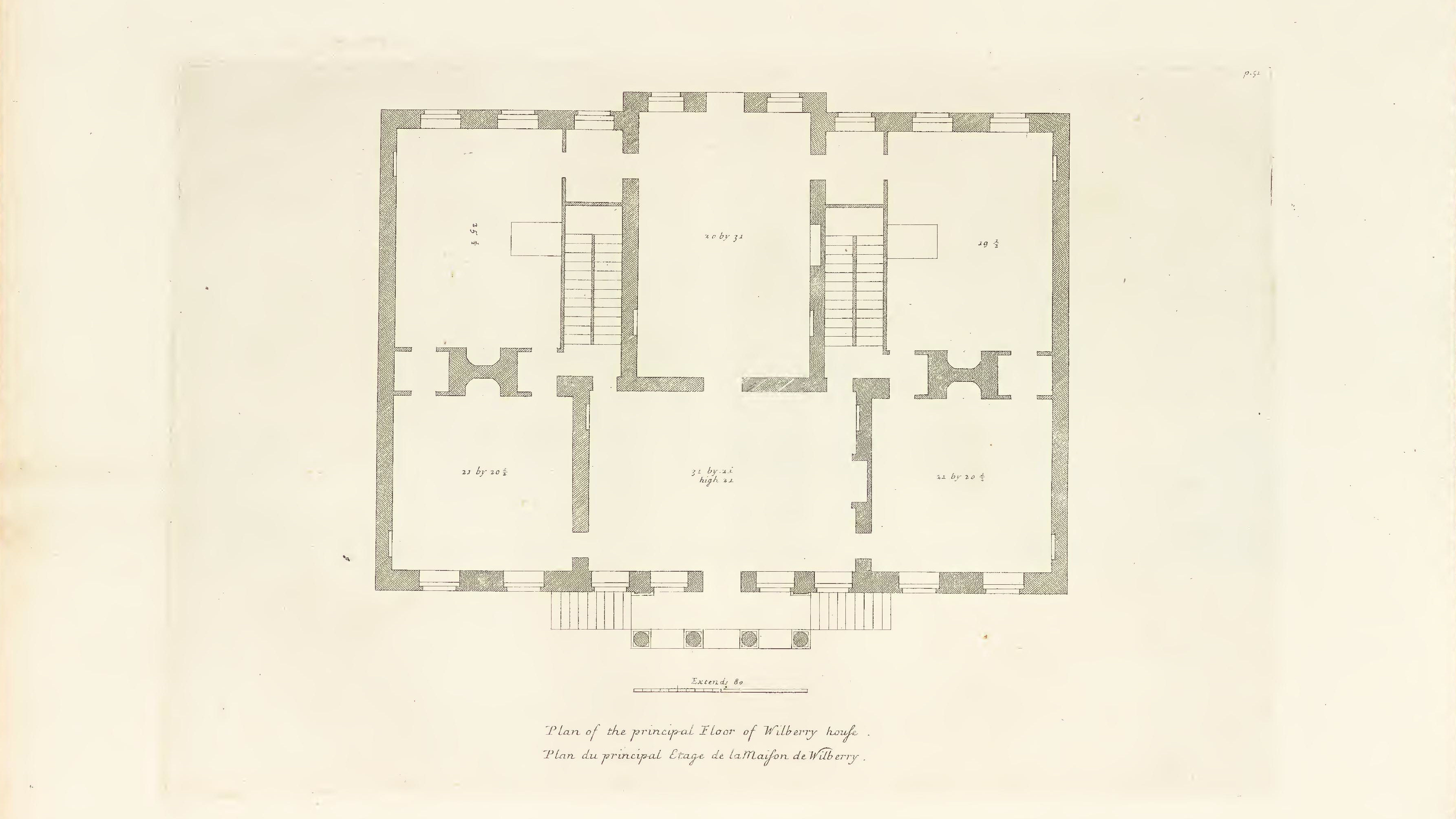
Plan of Wilbury House as it appeared originally, folio from Colen Campbell's Vitruvius Britannicus (1715)

The house was built around 1710 by and for William Benson, a country esquire and amateur architect, in the style of Inigo Jones. It was a modest country villa, single-storey with basements and attics. The south front was based on John Webb's 1661 Amesbury Abbey, where Benson had been a tenant. The original design for the house was featured in Vitruvius Britannicus in 1715. Pevsner describes Benson's design as "the first, not Neo-Palladian, but Neo-Inigo-Jones house in England".

Fulke Greville seems to have largely rebuilt the house in 1781. There were further changes in the next century, turning it into a substantial house. An 1813 engraving in The Beauties of England and Wales shows a pediment on the south portico which is no longer present, and a different arrangement of windows above it.

The present two-storey house has its entrance on the north side, where a three-bay porch on Ionic columns was probably added c.1800–1810. The seven-bay south front, overlooking the gardens, is flanked by large pavilion-like rooms added c.1760, partly octagonal and projecting forward. In the centre, the three-bay portico has Corinthian columns and a door of c.1770. The octagonal extensions have balustraded parapets, and the rest of the house has a cornice and low parapet, with six urns on the south side.

After the renovations overseen by Miranda Guinness in the early 21st century, the whole is faced with a pale yellow lime render.

Benson based the internal layout on Palladio's Villa Pojana; Orbach describes the double-height hall, with panelling and plasterwork, as "splendid", and when the house was listed at Grade I in 1953, the description stated that it has an "outstanding period interior of the early 18th century", with improvements later that century.

== Later owners ==
Benson sold the house and manor sometime after 1729, and they passed through several owners. Around 1739 the property was bought by Fulke Greville (1717–1806), Sheriff of Wiltshire for 1744, and later MP for Monmouth and a minor diplomat. Greville sold it c.1783, and from 1803 it was owned by Sir Charles Malet; it would remain in the Malet family for over a century.

Sir Charles (1752–1815) had been created a baronet in 1791 for his diplomatic services in India, while an official of the East India Company. His son Alexander (1800–1886) was also a diplomat, as was the 4th baronet, Edward (1837–1908). Sir Harry, 7th baronet (1873–1931) sold all his landholdings in the parish around 1925: three farms were sold separately, and workers' houses were bought by their tenants, while the house, its park, Home farm and Warren farm were sold to J. A. St. G. F. Despencer-Robertson. That land was bought in 1939 by Edward Grenfell, 1st Baron St Just, a partner in the merchant bank Morgan, Grenfell & Co., MP for the City of London and a director of the Bank of England.

Peter Grenfell (1922–1984) inherited the property from his father in 1941, and his second wife Maria Britneva – a Russian-born actress who became Tennessee Williams' literary executor – continued to live there until her death in 1994. The actor Rupert Everett, a friend of Maria, described the Wilbury estate in his memoir as "tumbledown". During her ownership, a formal garden was laid out south of the house.

Following Britneva's death in 1994, the house was bought in 1996 by Miranda Guinness, widow of Benjamin Guinness of the Dublin brewing family. She engaged the architects Peregrine Bryant to carry out careful restoration between 1998 and 2004, and redesigned the gardens. The house was inherited by her son Rory in 2010.

== Grounds ==
The main entrance to the grounds is south of the house, on the edge of Newton Tony village. Here is a lodge built in 1909 in classical style, with pedimented gables disguising its flat roof, and a loggia behind Tuscan columns.

A park was laid out around the house in the 18th century, with avenues, vistas and woodland. It is possible that William Benson or Henry Hoare, a later owner, may have engaged the landscape designer Charles Bridgeman (1690–1738); he is known to have worked at Amesbury Abbey.

North-east of the house, an avenue leads to a small octagonal summerhouse with a domed roof, built over an ice-house. It was built around 1710 and restored in 1899 and again after 1998, and is Grade II* listed. Other garden features include an 18th-century flint grotto, in woods south-west of the house.

== Today ==
In 2002, the house and estate were in divided private ownership. The house is private and not open to the public, except for specific tours.

== In media ==
The house was the filming location as Pendersleigh, the country house where Maurice visits his friend Clive, in the 1987 film Maurice. Lady Maria St. Just, an actress and trustee of the estate of Tennessee Williams, was a friend of Merchant and Ivory. In 1979 they had been weekend guests at Wilbury Park, which made an impression on James Ivory, and he chose this location for the film.

== Bibliography ==
- Hussey, Christopher. English Country Houses: Early Georgian, 1715-1760 . 1955. pp. 16–17. Country Life Limited, London.
- Kidd, Charles; Williamson, David (Editors). Debrett's Peerage and Baronetage. 1990. pg. P 1081. Debrett's Peerage Limited, London. ISBN 0312046405
- Kelly's Handbook to the Titled, Landed and Official Classes, 95th Annual Edition. 1969. pg. 1733. Kelly's Directories Ltd, London.
- Irish Georgian Society Newsletter. Summer 2004, pg. 6. Irish Georgian Society, Dublin.
- Colvin, Howard Biographical Dictionary of British Architects, 1600-1840. 1995. pg. 122. Yale University Press, New Haven. ISBN 0300072074
- Pym, John. Merchant Ivory's English Landscape: Rooms, Views, and Anglo-Saxon Attitudes. 1995. pg. 60. New York: Harry N. Abrams, Inc. ISBN 0810942755
