= John Spalding (Scottish politician) =

Scottish politician

John Spalding (1763 – 26 August 1815) was a Scottish MP in the British Parliament who represented Wigtown Burghs 1796–1803 and was elected a Fellow of the Royal Society in July 1797.

He married Mary Anne Eden, daughter of Thomas Eden and Mariana Jones, on 19 December 1807; their son was John Eden Spalding and their daughter was Marianne Spalding, wife of Sir Alexander Malet, 2nd Baronet, Envoy Extraordinary and Minister Plenipotentiary to German Confederation. After his death, Mary Anne went on to marry Henry Brougham, 1st Baron Brougham and Vaux.

Parliament of Great Britain
| Preceded by Nisbet Balfour | Member of Parliament for Wigtown Burghs; 1796–1801 | Succeeded by Parliament of the United Kingdom |
Parliament of the United Kingdom
| Preceded by Parliament of Great Britain | Member of Parliament for Wigtown Burghs; 1801–1803 | Succeeded by William Stewart |
