= Sir Charles Malet, 1st Baronet =

British diplomat

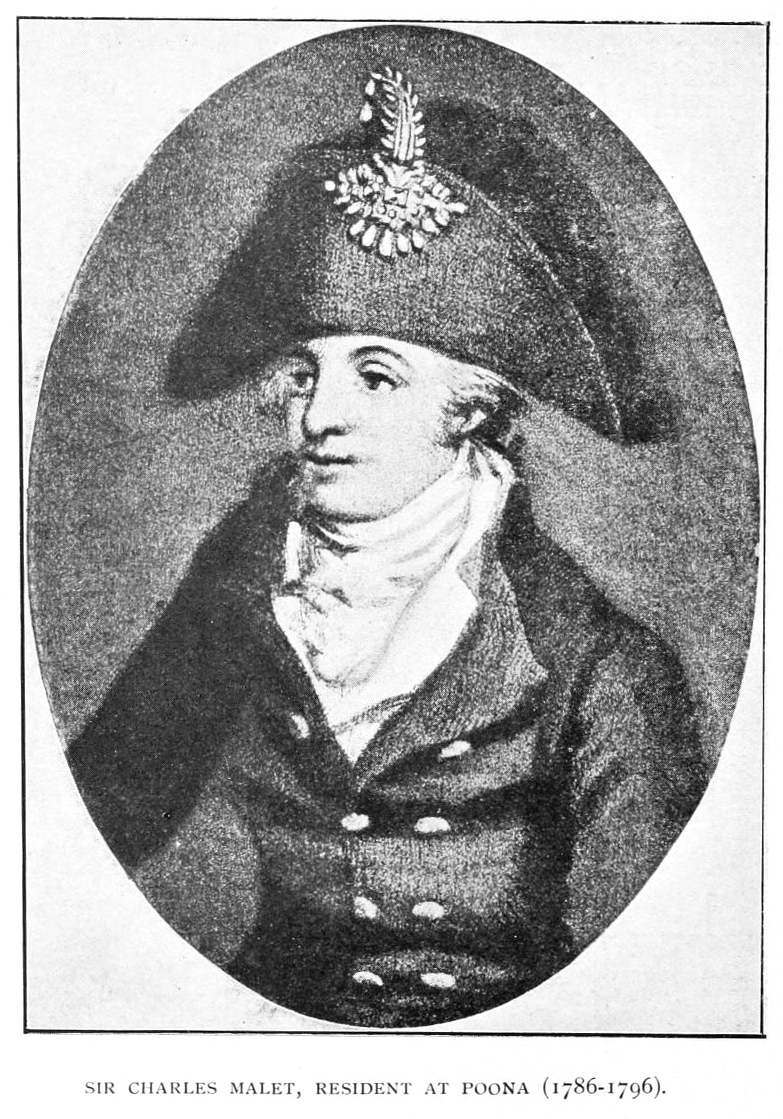
Malet illustrated in Poona in Bygone Days (1921)

Arms of Mallet: Azure, three escallops or

Sir Charles Warre Malet, 1st Baronet (30 December 1752 – 24 January 1815) was a British diplomat who served in the British East India Company as a Resident in the court of the Peshwa Marathas.

He was the oldest son of Alexander Malet (1704–1775), a rector at Combe Florey in Somerset, and his wife Ann. His first position was the Mughal emperor residency at Cambay from 1774 to 1785. He served in the East India Company and in 1785 was appointed Resident to the court of the Peshwas of Mahratta, subsequently building a house in a splendid park outside the town of Poona.

He considered western India an asset to improve British trade with China, and considered it important to have greater control over the rulers of western India. When Tipu Sultan attacked Travancore in 1789, Cornwallis made an alliance with the Nizam of Hyderabad who ruled Hyderabad State and the Peshwa of the Marathas through Malet. This treaty was signed with difficulty, as Tipu also sought to forge alliances with the Maratha Peshwas.

For his efforts Malet was created a baronet in February 1791. He left India in 1798 and married Susanna Wales (daughter of painter James Wales) in England. He continued to take an interest in India and influenced Thomas Daniell to publish Wales's paintings of the caves at Ellora, apart from writing about them.

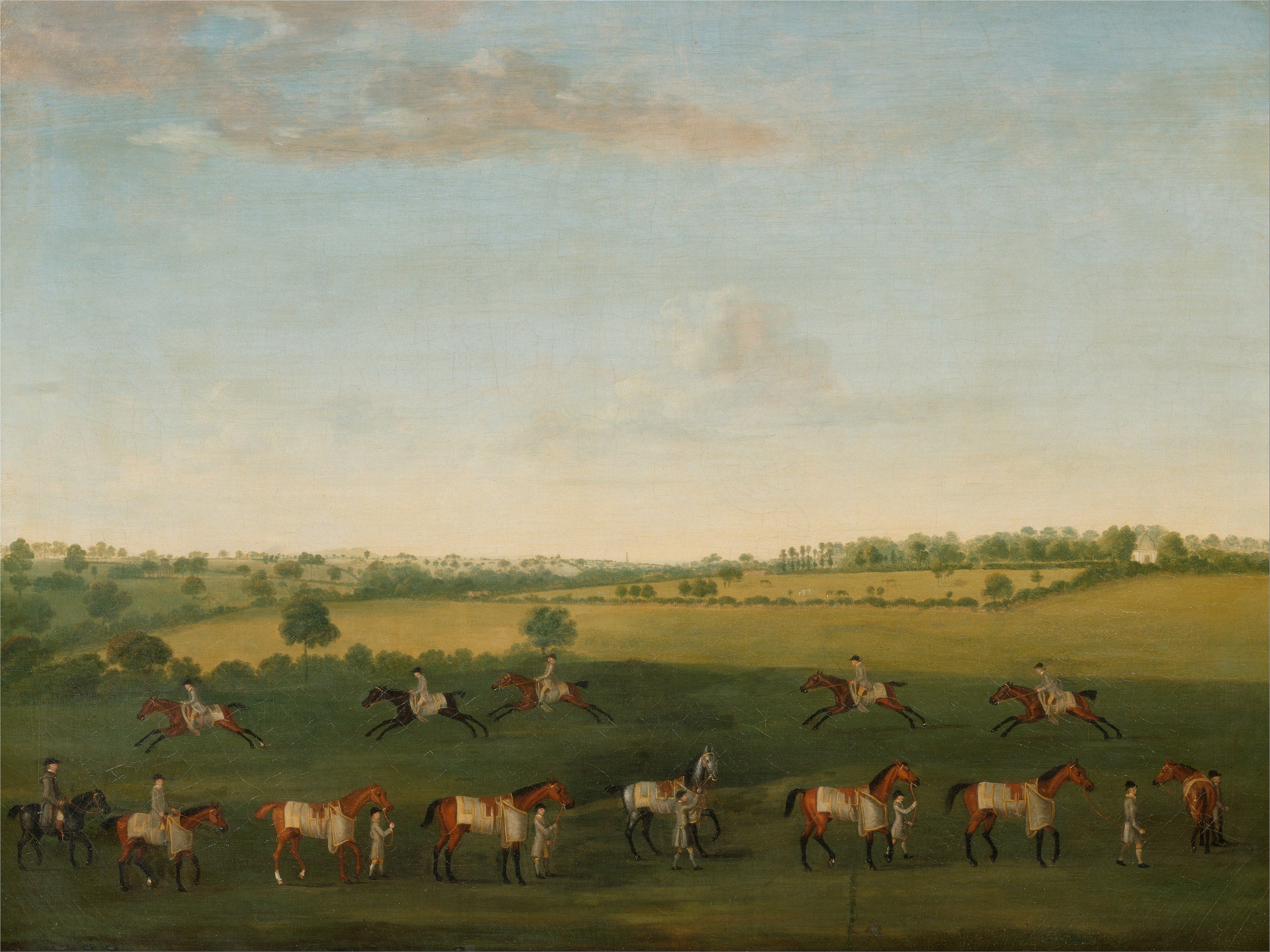
Sir Charles Warre Malet's string of racehorses at exercise in 1800, by Francis Sartorius

He was created a Fellow of the Royal Society and of the Society of Arts. He had eight children by Susanna, several of whom served in India:

- Sir Alexander Malet, 2nd Baronet (23 Jul 1800 – 28 Nov 1886);
- Lt Col Charles St Lo Malet (10 Jan 1802 – 20 Sep 1889);
- William Wyndham Malet (29 Sep 1803 – 12 Jun 1885);
- Lt Col George Grenville Malet (7 Mar 1805 – 9 Dec 1856);
- Arthur Malet (7 Nov 1806 – 13 Sep 1888);
- Hugh Poyntz Malet (13 Aug 1808 – 10 Mar 1904);
- Octavius Warre Malet (7 May 1811 – 11 Dec 1891);
- Alfred Augustus Malet (29 Aug 1814 – 21 Mar 1898).

He also had three children through his mistress Jahanara Khan, a princess from Rawalpindi. In 1798 He left Bibi Jahanara Khan in Pune and her three children later moved to England after being baptized as Christians. Portraits of the family were painted by James Wales.

Malet lived in Wilbury House, a country house in Wiltshire designed by William Benson. Upon his death the baronetcy passed to his son Alexander.

Baronetage of Great Britain
New creation	Baronet (of Wilbury); 1791–1815	Succeeded by Alexander Malet
