= Vitruvius Britannicus =

Series of architecture books

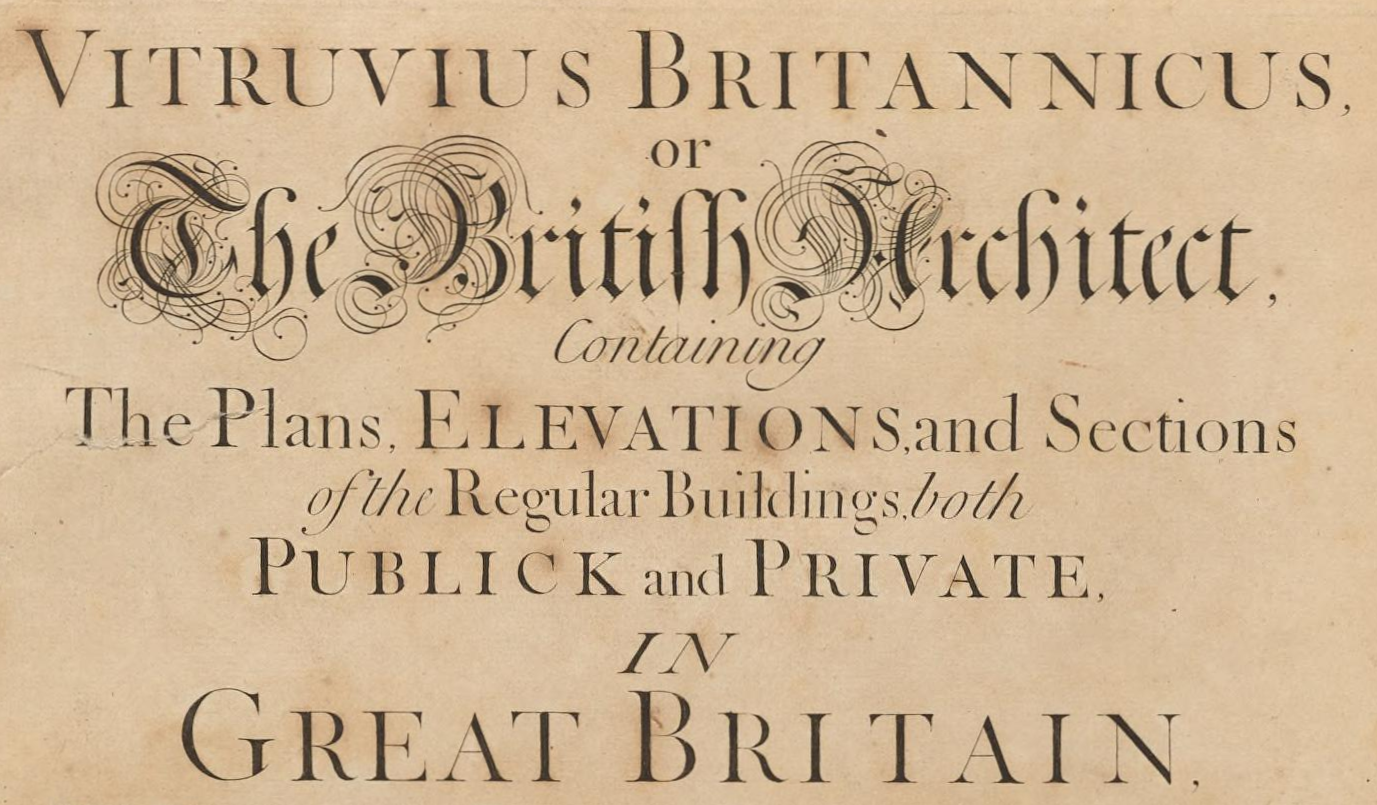
- Author: Colen Campbell; Badeslade and Rocque; Woolfe and Gandon; George Richardson
- Country: United Kingdom
- Language: English
- Genre: Architecture
- No. of books: 8 (or 9 including guide)

Vitruvius Britannicus is a British series of architecture books published beginning in 1715. Each volume contains architectural drawings for a selection of British buildings. Most of the drawings are of English country houses, though there are also a small number of non-residential works and original designs. The title of the series refers to Vitruvius and the books feature British examples of Palladian architecture.

The first series, which comprises three volumes, was published between 1715 and 1725 and was authored by Colen Campbell. In 1739, a second series began with the publication by Badeslade and Rocque of a fourth volume. This volume differed substantially from the original series and featured topographic images mostly. In 1769 and 1771, Woolfe and Gandon, who did not consider the 1739 volume to be a legitimate successor to the originals, produced a second series comprising the fourth and fifth volumes. In the first decade of the 19th century, George Richardson produced a third series, called The New Vitruvius Britannicus, which comprised two volumes. A fourth series was written in 1972 with the publication of a guide to the eight books.

The books of the Vitruvius Britannicus are essential documents in the history of British architecture and provide a record of many of the country's most famous built works, including several buildings that are now lost. These include Campbell's magnum opus, Wanstead House, which was demolished in 1825. Additionally, the books serve as records of British culture immediately following the Acts of Union 1707 and the Peace of Utrecht. Most scholarship has focused on the composition of Campbell's first series, which one author said was considered "the most iconic British architectural book of the eighteenth century."

== History and Composition ==
The book was conceived around 1713. Vitruvius Britannicus is primarily a "book of designs," that is, a book that documents extant buildings. This is opposed to pattern books, which provide builders templates with which to construct new buildings. Vitruvius was conceived as a book of ideal designs, being a collection of works by various architects instead of an edition documenting a single architect.

In his 1953 tome Architecture in Britain 1530–1830, historian Sir John Summerson provided a substantial account of the history of the books. In Sir John's telling, Vitruvius Britannicus and a new translation by Nicholas Dubois of Palladio's I quattro libri dell'architettura sought to initiate a new Palladian movement. The view of Vitruvius as a polemic persisted for decades after Summerson published his history. However, more recent scholarship has challenged the notion of Vitruvius Britannicus as a manifesto and posited instead that it was a celebration of Palladianism.

== List of books ==
=== Series 1 ===
- Vitruvius Britannicus, or, The British Architect: Volume I (1715)
- Vitruvius Britannicus, or, The British Architect: Volume II (1717)
- Vitruvius Britannicus, or, The British Architect: Volume III (1725)

=== Series 2 ===
- Vitruvius Britannicus, Volume the Fourth (1739)
- Vitruvius Britannicus, or, The British Architect: Volume IV (1769)
- Vitruvius Britannicus, or, The British Architect: Volume V (1771)

=== Series 3 ===
- The New Vitruvius Britannicus (1802)
- The New Vitruvius Britannicus, Volume II (1808)

=== Series 4 ===
- Guide to Vitruvius Britannicus (1972)

== Contents ==
=== Series 1 ===
==== Volume 1 ====
Building	Architect	Plates
St Paul's Cathedral	Inigo Jones	3-4
St. Peter's Basilica	various	5-7
Proposed design for a church at Lincoln's Inn Fields, London	Colen Campbell	8-9
St Philip's Cathedral, Birmingham	Thomas Archer	10-11
Banqueting House	Inigo Jones	12-13
Queen's House	Inigo Jones	14-15
Gallery at Somerset House	John Webb	16
Gunnersbury Park	John Webb	17-18
Proposed design for the Duke of Argyll	Colen Campbell	19-20
Wanstead House	Colen Campbell	21-22
Proposed design for the Earl of Halifax	Colen Campbell	23-27
Burlington House	James Gibbs	28-30
Pavilion at Wrest Park	Thomas Archer	31-33
Montagu House	Monsieur Pouget	34-36
Drumlanrig Castle	Robert Mylne	37-38
Marlborough House	Christopher Wren	39-40
Newcastle House	William Winde	41-42
Buckingham House	William Winde	43-44
Stoke Edith House		45-46
Kings Weston House	John Vanbrugh	47-48
Lindsey House	Inigo Jones	49-50
Wilbury House	William Benson	51-52
Proposed Design for the Earl of Ilay	Colen Campbell	53-54
Blenheim Palace	John Vanbrugh	55-62
Castle Howard	John Vanbrugh	63-71
Chatsworth House	various	72-76
Orleans House	John James	77
Escot House	Henry Roberts	78-79
Roehampton House	Thomas Archer	80-81
Greenwich Hospital		82-89
Thoresby Hall		90-91
Wentworth Castle		92-94
Proposed design for the Lord Perceval	Colen Campbell	95-97
Easton Neston	Nicholas Hawksmoor	98-100

==== Volume 2 ====
Building	Architect	Plates
Palace of Whitehall		2-19
St Paul's, Covent Garden		20-22
Royal Exchange, London		23-25
Steeple of St Mary-le-Bow		26
Proposed design for a church in the Vitruvian style		27
Water gate at York House		28
Cobham Hall		29-30
Cholmondeley Castle		31-34
Eaton Hall, Cheshire		35-36
Belton House		37-38
Highmeadow House		39-40
Proposed design for Tobias Jenkyns		41-42
Beddington Place		43-45
Sunbury House		46
Hall Barn		47
Epson House		48-49
Melville House		50
Shawfield Mansion		51
Proposed design for Eastbury Park		52-55
Bradley House, Wiltshire		56
Hampton Court Castle		57-58
Shobdon Court		59-60
Wilton House		61-67
Longleat		68-69
Cliveden		70-74
Hopetoun House		75-77
Lowther Castle		78-80
Bramham Park		81-82
Proposed design for Robert Walpole		83-84
Chevening		85
Proposed design for James Stanhope		86
Hotham House		87
Hedworth House		88
Proposed design for Paul Methuen		89-90
Witham House		91-92
Dyrham Park		91, 93
Newbold Revel		94
Althorp		95-97
Proposed design for Lord Cadogan		98-100

==== Volume 3 ====
Building	Architect	Plates
Greenwich Hospital		3-4
Castle Howard		5-6
Ambresbury		7
Castle Ashby		8
Stoke Park		9
General Wade's House		10
Grimsthorpe		11-14
Eastbury		15-19
Seaton Delaval		20-21
Burlington House		22-26
Houghton		27-34
Mereworth Castle		35-38
Wanstead House		39-40
Stourhead Castle		41-43
The Rolls		44-45
Newby		46
Ebberton Lodge		47
Lord Herbert's House		48
Hall Barn		49-50
Goodwood		51-54
Mr Plumptre's House		55
Proposed design for a Bridge at Lambeth		56
Wilton		57-60
Apple Dorecombe		61
High Meadow		62
Long Leate		63-66
Chatsworth		67-68
Belton		69-70
Woodstock Park		71-72
Boughton		73-74
Hampton Court		75
Lowther Hall		76
Claremont		77-78
Cholmondley		79-80
Thorsby		81-82
Althorp		83-84
Duncomb Park		85-88
Atherton		89
Rookby Park		90
Horse Heath Hall		91-92
House at Twickenham		93
Leyton Grange		94
Narford		95
Caversham		96-97
Proposed		98-100

=== Series 2 ===
==== Volume 4 (Badeslade and Rocque) ====
Building	Architect	Plates
Royal Palace Richmond		1
Royal Palace Kensington		2-3
Hampton Court		4-5
Royal Palace Richmond		6-10
Kiveton House		11-18
Claremont		19-23
Cannons		24-27
Proposed house for the Duke of Chandois		33-34
Duke of Kent House		30-33
Duke of Dorset House		34-35
Boughton		36-37
Windsor Lodge		38-39
Bulstroude		40-44
Drumlangrig		45-46
Belvoir Castle		47-50
Averham Park		51-52
Bogbengieght		53-54
Stainborough		55-58
Exton Park		59-62
Wentworth House		55-56
Helmingham Hall		63-64
Ham House		65-66
Weybridge		67-68
Marston		69-70
Warwick Castle		71-72
Heanton Hall		73-74
Four Oaks Hall		75-76
Totteridge Park		77-78
Wentworth House		79-81
Chiswick		82-83
Southill		84-87
Belton		88-89
South Dalton		90-91
Colonel Williamson House		92-93
Mount Edgcumbe		94-95
Lawne		96-97
Coppeed Hall		98-99
Shardeloes		100-101
Pilewell		102-103
Tring		104-105
Stanford Hall		106-107
Ravenfield		108-109
Echa		110-111
Navy Office		112-113

==== Volume 4 (Woolfe and Gandon) ====
Building	Architect	Plates
His Majesty's Lodge		1-4
Duke of York's Palace		5-7
Foot's Cray		8-10
Parksted		11-13
Dudington		14-17
Bridge		18
Devonshire House		19-20
Wooburn		21-25
Thomas Wyndham House		26-29
Moulsham Hall		30-31
Kirtlington Park		32-36
Earl Spencer House		37-40
Mansion House		41-44
Kedleston		45-51
Stratton Park		52-55
Huthall		56-57
On Blackheath		58-64
Gopsal		65-66
Earl of Chesterfield House		67-69
Nostell		70-73
Charles Asgill House		74
Coome Bank		75-77
York Assembly Room		78-81
Fonthill		82-87
Cusworth		88-89
Buckland		91-93
Latham Hall		94-98

==== Volume 5 (Woolfe and Gandon) ====
Building	Architect	Plates
Horse Guards		3-8
Shelburn House		9-10
Thorseby Lodge		11-13
Hagley Park		14-15
Oakland House		16-19
Wimbledon Park		20-22
Harwood House		23-28
Croom Park		29-30
Foremark		31-35
Constable Burton		36-37
Whitham Park		38-42
Crompton House		43-44
Byng House		45-46
High Wickham		48-49
Moor Park		50-55
Botley		56-57
Duff House		58-60
Castle Hill		61-63
Holkham		64-69
Kirby Hall		70-71
Nottingham County Hall		72-77
Standlinch		78-81
Haythorp		82-85
Coleshill		86-87
Wilton Bridge		88-89
Sandon		90-93
Londford Castle		94-98
Newnham Park		99-100

=== Series 3: The New Vitruvius Britannicus ===
==== Volume 1 ====
Building	Architect	Plates
Bowden Park		1-2
Tusmore House		3-5
Brighton Pavilion		6-7
Public Assembly Rooms, Glasgow		8-9
Sydney Lodge		10
Gore Court		11
Basildon House		12-14
Longford House		15-16
Broomfield Lodge		17-18
Putney Park Villa		19-21
Great Tower Hill Building		22-23
Windmill Hill		24-26
Watton Wood Hall		27-28
Southgate Grove		29-31
Addington Lodge		32-33
Session House		34-35
Stoke Park		36-38
Eastwell House		39-42
Gossford House		43-50
Thornes House		51-53
Denton Hall		54-56
Doddington Hall		57-60
Claremont		61-63
Crowsnest House		64-66
Courteen Hall		67-68
Buckminster Park		69-72

==== Volume 2 ====
Building	Architect	Plates
York Basilica		1-4
Grocers Hall		5-6
Hall at Stafford		7-10
Newark Town Hall		11-14
Roseneath		15-16
Commissioner's House		17-22
Hurlingham		23-24
Attingham		25-30
Donington Park		31-35
Woolley Park		36-38
Royal Military Asylum		39-42
Athenaeum		43-44
Dr Synge House		45-50
Loudoun Castle		51-56
Pitshanger Place		57-59
Osberton House		60-61
Middleton Hall		62-64
Castle Coole		65-70
