= Malet baronets =

Title in the Baronetage of Great Britain

Arms of Mallet: Azure, three escallops or

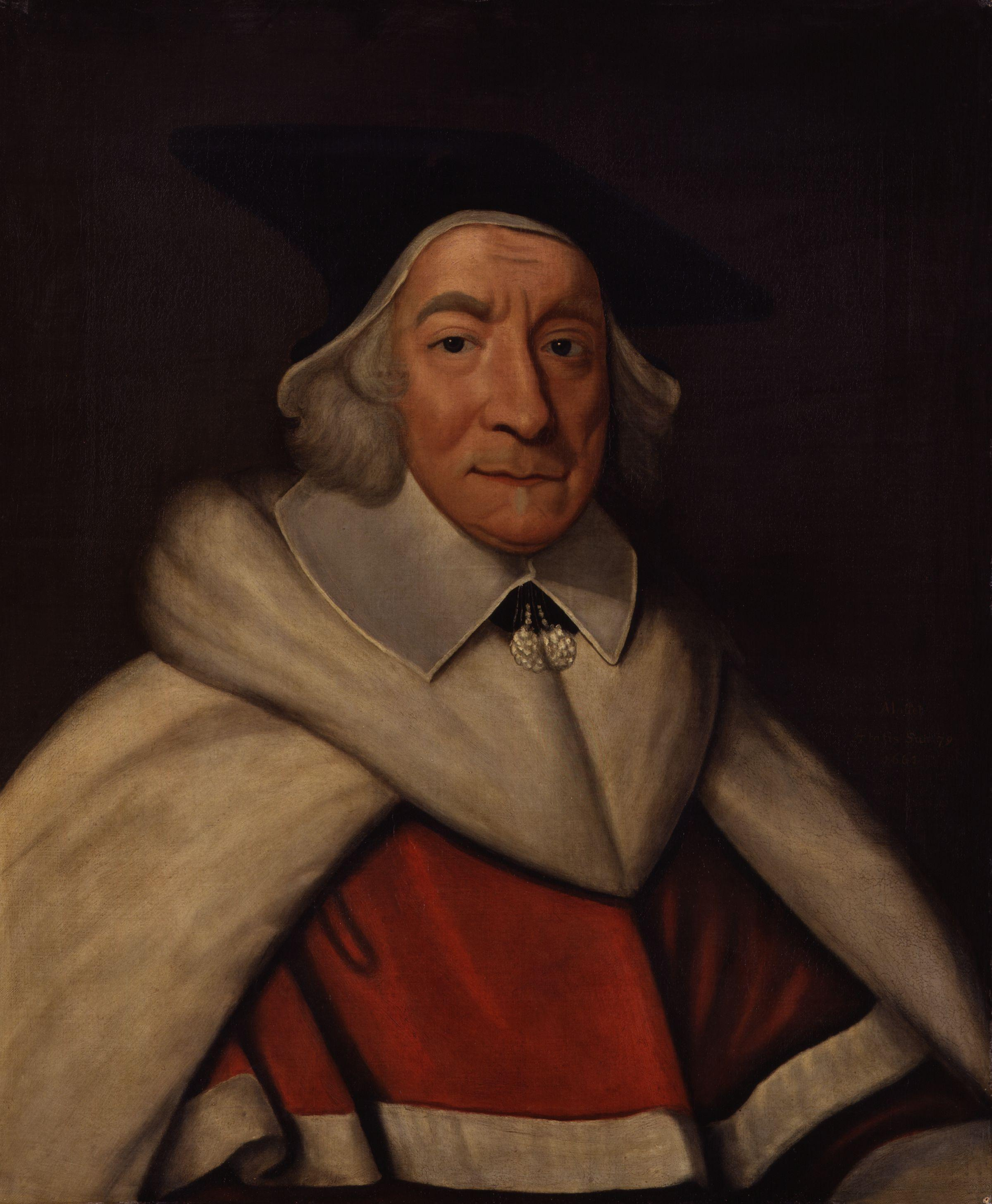
Sir Thomas Malet (1582–1665)

The Malet Baronetcy, of Wilbury in the County of Wiltshire, is a title in the Baronetage of Great Britain. It was created on 24 February 1791 for Charles Malet, for diplomatic services in India.

== Former seat ==
Around 1803, the 1st Baronet bought Wilbury Park, an 18th-century house in extensive grounds, in Newton Tony parish, north-east of Salisbury. The estate and its farms remained in Malet ownership until they were sold by the 7th baronet, around 1925.

Newton Tony parish church was rebuilt in 1844, at the expense of (according to one source) the Malet family. Inside are monuments to several generations of Malets. The village pub is called the Malet Arms; that name has been adopted in turn by several inns since the mid-19th century.

== Malet Baronets, of Wilbury (1791) ==
- Sir Charles Warre Malet, 1st Baronet (1752–1815)
- Sir Alexander Malet, 2nd Baronet (1800–1886).Minister to the German Confederation from 1852 to 1866. The 4th Baronet was Ambassador to Germany between 1884 and 1895.
- Sir Henry Charles Eden Malet, 3rd Baronet (1835–1904)
- Sir Edward Baldwin Malet, 4th Baronet (1837–1908)
- Sir Edward St Lo Malet, 5th Baronet (1872–1909)
- Sir Charles St Lo Malet, 6th Baronet (1906–1918)
- Sir Harry Charles Malet, 7th Baronet (1873–1931). A Colonel in the 8th King's Royal Irish Hussars, who served in the Second Anglo-Boer War and the First World War and was awarded a DSO and OBE.
- Sir Edward William St Lo Malet, 8th Baronet (1908–1990). Also a Colonel in the 8th King's Royal Irish Hussars, and High Sheriff of Somerset from 1966 to 1967.
- Sir Harry Douglas St Lo Malet, 9th Baronet (born 1936)

The heir apparent is the present holder's son Charles Edward St. Lo Malet (born 1970).

Baronetage of Great Britain
Preceded by Orde baronets	Malet baronets of Wilbury; 24 February 1791	Succeeded by Kennaway baronets
