= James Wales (artist) =

Scottish artist

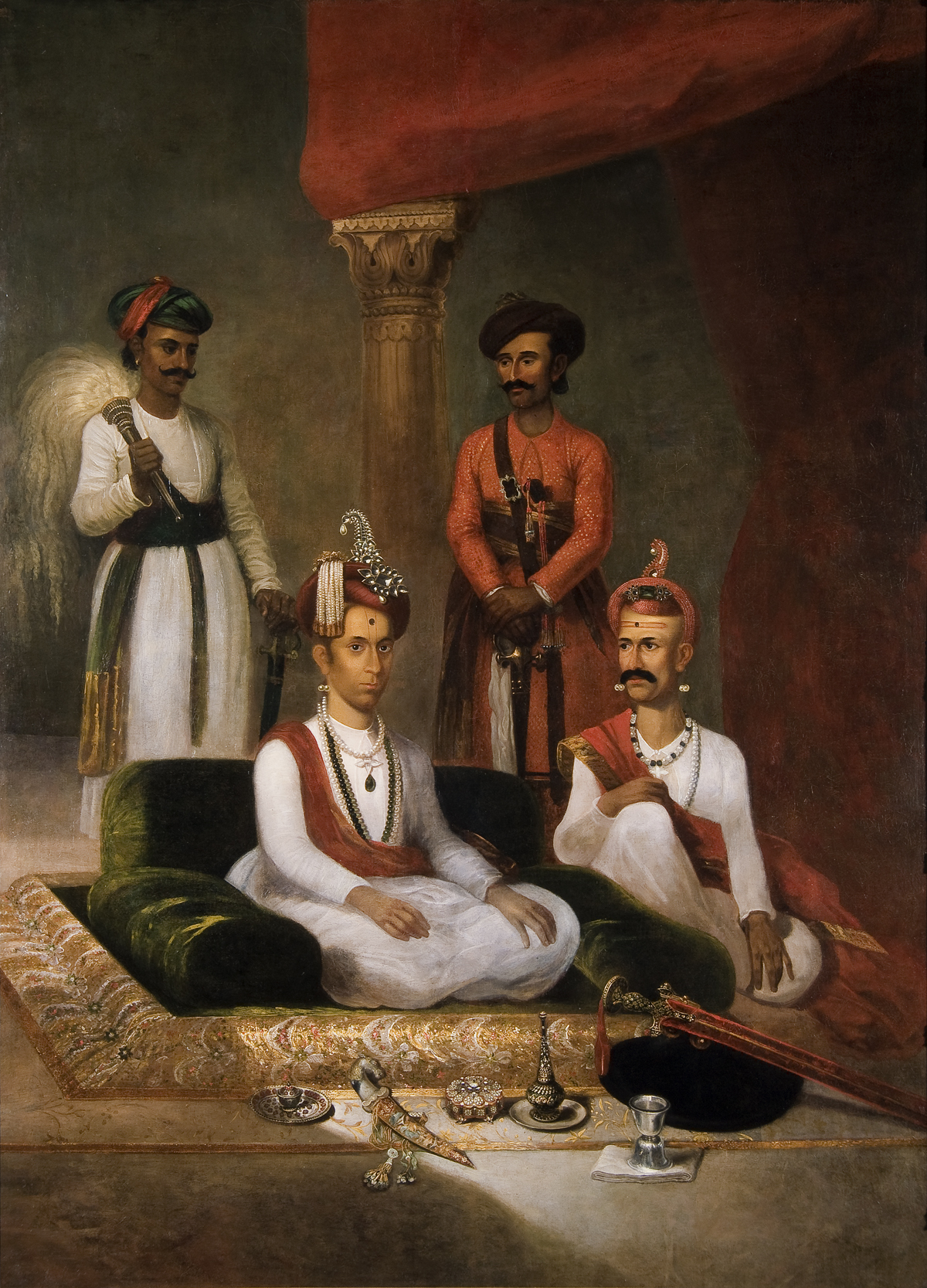
Madhu Rao Narayan, Maratha Peshwa and Nana Fadnavis with Attendants (1792)

James Wales (1747–1795) was a Scottish artist.

== Biography ==
Born in Peterhead, Wales sold portraits in Aberdeen before moving to London, where his work was displayed by the Royal Academy and the Society of Artists.

In 1791, Wales arrived in India, and painted portraits of Sawai Madhavrao, Nana Fadnavis, and other figures of the Maratha Empire.

He also made drawings and paintings of the Elephanta Caves and the Ellora Caves. His depictions of the latter were published in the 1803 book Hindoo Excavations in the Mountain of Ellora near Aurungabad in the Decan.

His daughter Susanna Wales also painted portraits, and married Sir Charles Malet, 1st Baronet, whom Wales met while in India.

== See also ==
- Thomas Daniell
- William Daniell
