= Edward Malet =

British diplomat (1837–1908)

The Right Honourable Sir Edward Malet GCB GCMG Bt
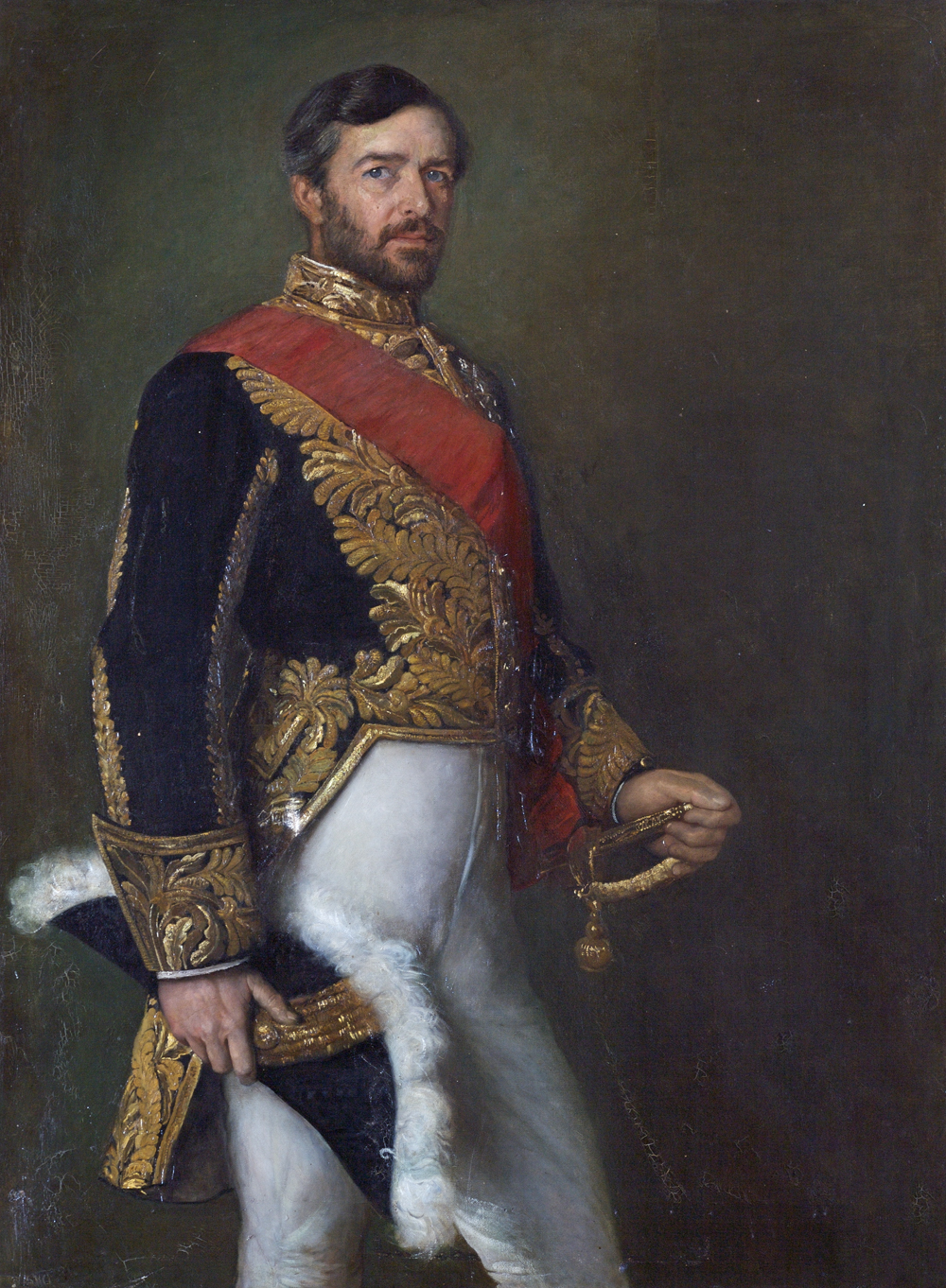

British Ambassador to Germany
- In office 1884–1895
- Preceded by: Lord Odo Russell
- Succeeded by: Sir Frank Lascelles

Consul-General in Egypt
- In office 1879–1883
- Preceded by: Frank Lascelles
- Succeeded by: Sir Evelyn Baring

Personal details
- Born: 10 October 1837
- Died: 29 June 1908 (aged 70)
- Spouse: Ermyntrude Sackville Russell
- Education: Eton College
- Occupation: Diplomat
- Known for: Malet Memorial Hall

Arms of Mallet: Azure, three escallops or

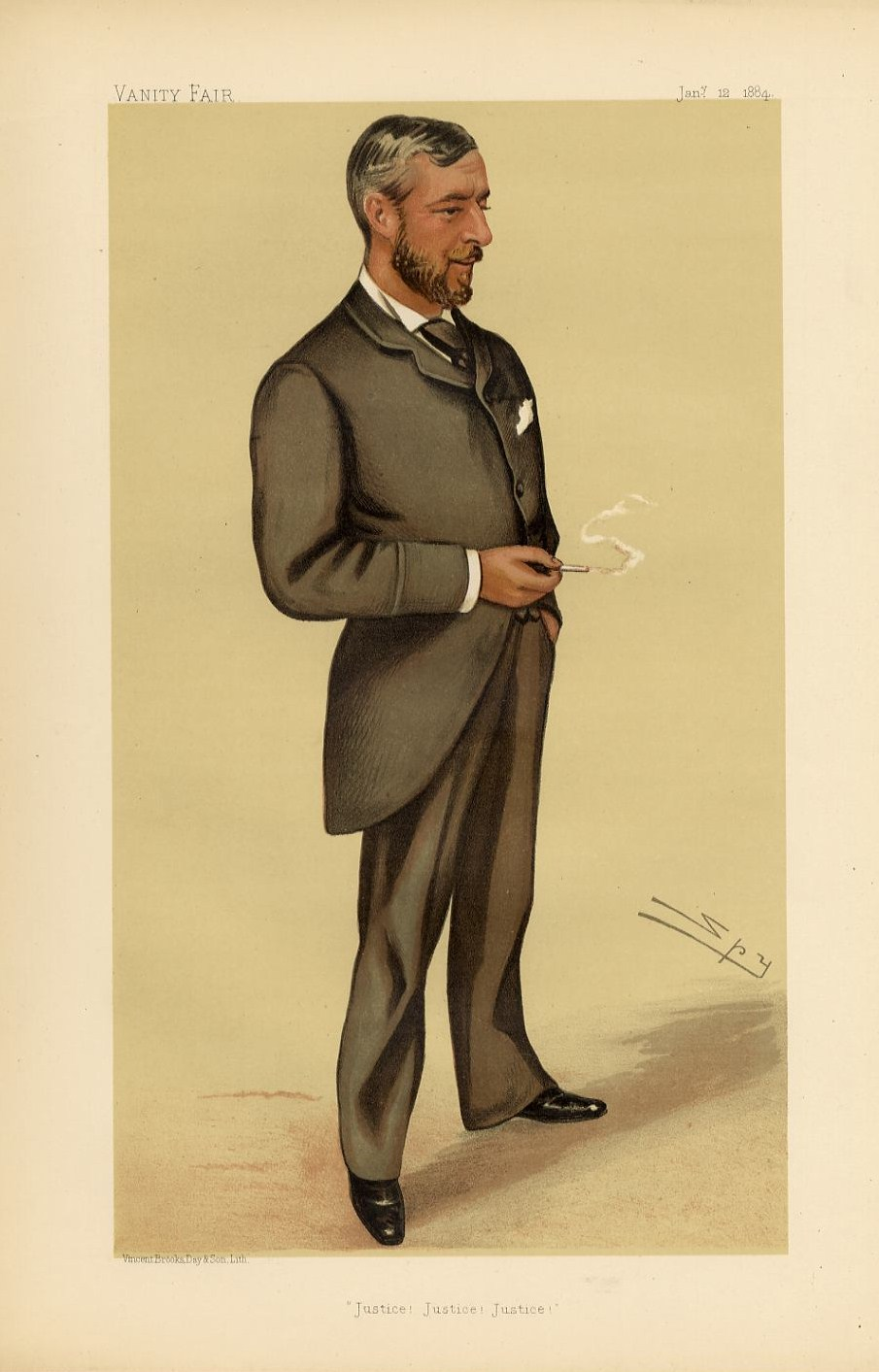
Caricature of Sir Edward Malet by Leslie Ward published in the British magazine Vanity Fair (1884)

Sir Edward Baldwin Malet, 4th Baronet GCB GCMG PC (10 October 1837 – 29 June 1908) was a British diplomat.

Edward Malet came from a family of diplomats; his father was Sir Alexander Malet, British minister to Württemberg and later to the German Confederation. After three years at Eton College, Edward Malet entered the foreign service at the age of 17. He served as attaché to his father in Frankfurt, then in Brussels.

He was trained in the diplomatic service by Richard Lyons, 1st Viscount Lyons, and was a member of the Tory-sympathetic 'Lyons School' of British diplomacy.

He served as Secretary of Legation at Peking (1871–1873), Athens (1873–1875), Rome (1875–1878), and Constantinople (1878–1879). Malet formed close ties with Ottoman sultan Abdul Hamid II ("Abdul the Damned") during 1878, the year of the Treaties of San Stefano and Berlin.

Malet was appointed Agent and Consul-General in Egypt on 10 October 1879. He served there until 1883, pressing for administrative and financial reforms. He was at first sympathetic to Ahmed Orabi's demand for constitutional government. However, historians John Galbraith and Afaf al-Sayyid-Marsot write that after British-French Joint Note was sent to the Egyptian government, Malet gradually began to support the plans of the Gladstone Cabinet to intervene in Egypt, writing on 13 February 1882, "I am prejudiced against the Nationalists." He served a crucial role in the decision of Gladstone's Cabinet to invade Alexandria when he sent a telegram to the Cabinet that both exaggerated the instability of the Khedive's rule in Egypt and also advised the British government to conduct a naval demonstration off Alexandria. (see 1882 Anglo-Egyptian War). Galbraith and al-Sayyid-Marsot describe him as having been naive, in that he hoped the British would attempt to militarily intimidate Urabi, though he never expected an actual attack or occupation by British forces He left Egypt on the 23rd of June 1882, due to a sudden illness that left him "prostrate". Later on, he came to believe his illness was part of a plot to poison and kill him. He later served as Minister to Belgium (1883–1884), and Ambassador to the German Empire (1884–1895).

In 1892 he built an immense Beaux-Arts villa "Le Chateau Malet" at Cap D’Ail, France.

On 19 March 1885, Edward Malet married Lady Ermyntrude Sackville Russell, daughter of Francis Russell, 9th Duke of Bedford and Lady Elizabeth Sackville-West.

The Malet Memorial Hall, a Tudor Revival-style building which had a church on its upper floor, was founded in his memory by his widow in 1912 in Bexhill-on-Sea. It opened in October 1913.

Malet Street, a street in the Bloomsbury district of Central London, has been named in his honour.

== Bibliography ==
- Malet, Egypt, 1879-1883 (London, 1909) online

Diplomatic posts
| Preceded by Frank Lascelles | British Agent and Consul-General in Egypt; 1879–1883 | Succeeded by Evelyn Baring |
| Preceded by John Savile | British Envoy Extraordinary and Minister Plenipotentiary to Belgium; 1883–1884 | Succeeded by Hussey Vivian |
| Preceded by The Lord Ampthill | British Ambassador Extraordinary and Plenipotentiary to the German Empire; 1884–1895 | Succeeded by Sir Frank Lascelles |
Baronetage of Great Britain
| Preceded by Henry Charles Eden Malet | Baronet (of Wilbury); 1904–1908 | Succeeded by Edward St Lo Malet |
