= Sir Alexander Malet, 2nd Baronet =

British diplomat and writer

Sir Alexander Malet KCB JP DL Bt
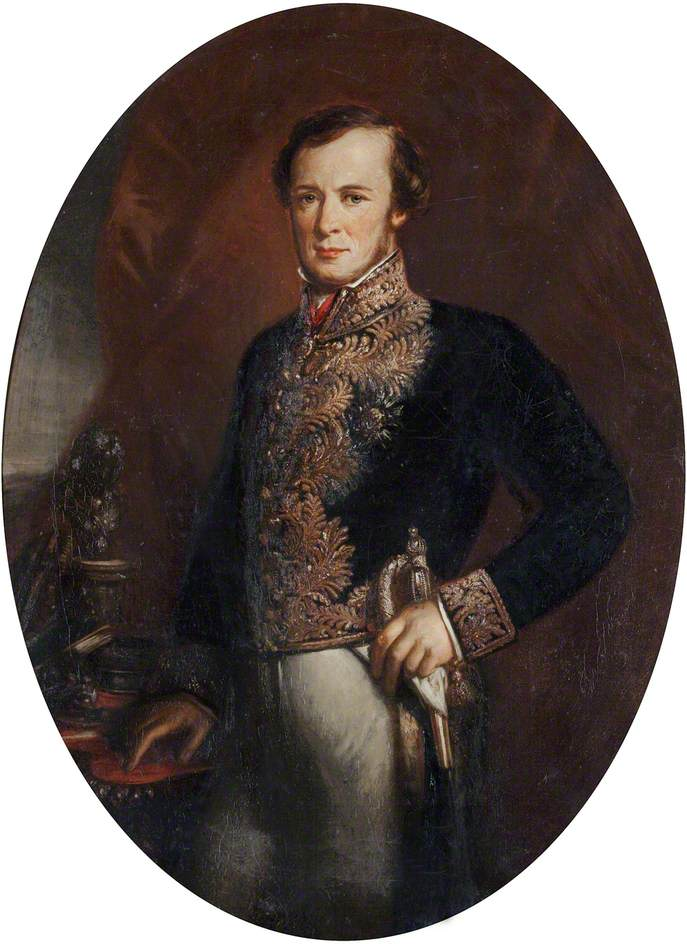
- Portrait by Jules Lunteschütz

Envoy Extraordinary and Minister Plenipotentiary to Württemberg
- In office 1844–1849

Envoy Extraordinary and Minister Plenipotentiary to the German Confederation
- In office 1849–1866

Personal details
- Born: 23 July 1800 Hartham Park, Wiltshire
- Died: 28 November 1886 (aged 86) Queensbury Place, Cromwell Road, London
- Spouse: Mary Anne Spalding
- Children: Sir Edward Malet
- Education: Winchester College; Christ Church, Oxford

Arms of Mallet: Azure, three escallops or

Sir Alexander Malet, 2nd Baronet KCB JP DL (23 July 1800 – 28 November 1886) was a British diplomat and writer.

== Life ==
The eldest son of Sir Charles Malet, 1st Baronet, born at Hartham Park, Wiltshire in June 1800, he succeeded to the baronetcy in 1815. He was educated at Winchester College and at Christ Church, Oxford (B.A. 1822), and entered the diplomatic service in 1824 as unpaid attaché at St. Petersburg. There he was an eye-witness to the Decembrist revolt of 1825.

Malet later became secretary of legation at Lisbon under Lord Howden during the Miguelite war of 1832–1834. He served in a similar post at The Hague, and was then secretary of the embassy at Vienna, and British minister at Württemberg.

In 1849 Malet became minister plenipotentiary to the Germanic Confederation at Frankfurt, and there formed a close friendship with Prince Bismarck. He was in post from the Revolution in Baden, to the battle of Sadowa, and the expulsion of Austria from the Confederation.

On the fall of the Germanic confederation in 1866, Malet retired on a pension, and was made a K.C.B. He died on 28 November 1886.

== Works ==
Malet was the author of:

- Some Account of the System of Fagging at Winchester School, with Remarks … on the late Expulsions thence for resistance to the Authority of the Prefects, London, 1828;
- An English metrical translation of Wace's Roman de Rou, London, 1860; and of
- The Overthrow of the Germanic Confederation by Prussia in 1866, London, 1870.

== Family ==
In 1834 Malet married Marianne Dora, only daughter of John Spalding, of the Holm, Scotland and stepdaughter of Lord Brougham. They had two sons, Lieutenant-colonel Sir Henry Charles Eden Malet, 3rd Baronet, and Edward Malet.

== Notes ==
Attribution

This article incorporates text from a publication now in the public domain: Lee, Sidney, ed. (1893). "Malet, Charles Warre". Dictionary of National Biography. Vol. 35. London: Smith, Elder & Co.

Baronetage of Great Britain
Preceded by Charles Malet	Baronet (of Wilbury); 1815–1886	Succeeded by Henry Malet
