= List of United Kingdom locations: Wi-Win =

The United Kingdom

This is part of the list of United Kingdom locations: a gazetteer of place names in the United Kingdom showing each place's locality and geographical coordinates.

== Wi ==
=== Wia-Wik ===
Location	Locality	Coordinates (links to map & photo sources)	OS grid reference
Wiay	Highland	57.33°N 06.49°W	NG295360
Wiay	Western Isles	57.39°N 07.20°W	NF875459
Wibdon	Gloucestershire	51.67°N 02.63°W	ST5697
Wibsey	Bradford	53.76°N 01.78°W	SE1430
Wibtoft	Warwickshire	52.47°N 01.30°W	SP4787
Wichenford	Worcestershire	52.23°N 02.32°W	SO7860
Wichling	Kent	51.27°N 00.75°E	TQ9256
Wick	Bournemouth	50.71°N 01.78°W	SZ1591
Wick	Devon	50.82°N 03.17°W	ST1703
Wick	Highland	58.43°N 03.09°W	ND3650
Wick (Curry Rivel)	Somerset	51.03°N 02.85°W	ST4026
Wick (Lympsham)	Somerset	51.27°N 02.97°W	ST3253
Wick (Stogursey)	Somerset	51.18°N 03.13°W	ST2144
Wick	South Gloucestershire	51.45°N 02.43°W	ST7073
Wick	The Vale Of Glamorgan	51.43°N 03.55°W	SS9272
Wick	West Sussex	50.81°N 00.55°W	TQ0203
Wick	Wiltshire	50.98°N 01.77°W	SU1621
Wick	Worcestershire	52.10°N 02.05°W	SO9645
Wicken	Cambridgeshire	52.30°N 00.28°E	TL5670
Wicken	Northamptonshire	52.04°N 00.92°W	SP7439
Wicken Bonhunt	Essex	51.97°N 00.16°E	TL4933
Wickenby	Lincolnshire	53.31°N 00.38°W	TF0881
Wick Episcopi	Worcestershire	52.17°N 02.25°W	SO8353
Wickersley	Rotherham	53.41°N 01.27°W	SK4891
Wicker Street Green	Suffolk	52.03°N 00.87°E	TL9741
Wickford	Essex	51.60°N 00.51°E	TQ7493
Wickham	Berkshire	51.43°N 01.44°W	SU3971
Wickham	Hampshire	50.89°N 01.19°W	SU5711
Wickham Bishops	Essex	51.77°N 00.66°E	TL8412
Wickhambreaux	Kent	51.27°N 01.18°E	TR2258
Wickhambrook	Suffolk	52.16°N 00.54°E	TL7455
Wickhamford	Worcestershire	52.06°N 01.91°W	SP0641
Wickham Green	Berkshire	51.43°N 01.44°W	SU3971
Wickham Green	Suffolk	52.27°N 01.06°E	TM0969
Wickham Heath	Berkshire	51.41°N 01.39°W	SU4269
Wickham Market	Suffolk	52.14°N 01.36°E	TM3055
Wickhampton	Norfolk	52.58°N 01.57°E	TG4205
Wickham's Cross	Somerset	51.08°N 02.71°W	ST5032
Wickham Skeith	Suffolk	52.27°N 01.06°E	TM0969
Wickham St Paul	Essex	51.99°N 00.66°E	TL8336
Wickham Street (Wickham Skeith)	Suffolk	52.28°N 01.04°E	TM0869
Wickham Street (Wickhambrook)	Suffolk	52.15°N 00.55°E	TL7554
Wick Hill (Bracknell)	Berkshire	51.42°N 00.75°W	SU8770
Wick Hill (Finchampstead)	Berkshire	51.36°N 00.85°W	SU8064
Wick Hill	Kent	51.13°N 00.62°E	TQ8441
Wickhurst	Kent	51.20°N 00.17°E	TQ5247
Wicklane	Bath and North East Somerset	51.32°N 02.44°W	ST6958
Wicklewood	Norfolk	52.57°N 01.05°E	TG0702
Wickmere	Norfolk	52.85°N 01.22°E	TG1733
Wickridge Street	Gloucestershire	51.94°N 02.27°W	SO8127
Wick Rocks	South Gloucestershire	51.45°N 02.43°W	ST7073
Wick St Lawrence	North Somerset	51.38°N 02.92°W	ST3665
Wickstreet	East Sussex	50.85°N 00.17°E	TQ5308
Wick Street	Gloucestershire	51.76°N 02.20°W	SO8607
Wickwar	South Gloucestershire	51.59°N 02.40°W	ST7288
Widbrook	Wiltshire	51.33°N 02.24°W	ST8359
Widcombe	Bath and North East Somerset	51.36°N 02.34°W	ST7663
Widdington	Essex	51.95°N 00.22°E	TL5331
Widdrington	Northumberland	55.24°N 01.60°W	NZ2595
Widdrington Station	Northumberland	55.24°N 01.62°W	NZ2494
Widecombe in the Moor	Devon	50.56°N 03.82°W	SX7176
Widegates	Cornwall	50.38°N 04.42°W	SX2857
Widemarsh	Herefordshire	52.06°N 02.73°W	SO5041
Widemouth Bay	Cornwall	50.78°N 04.55°W	SS2002
Wideopen	Newcastle upon Tyne	55.04°N 01.64°W	NZ2372
Widewell	Devon	50.42°N 04.12°W	SX4961
Widford	Essex	51.71°N 00.44°E	TL6905
Widford	Hertfordshire	51.81°N 00.05°E	TL4215
Widgham Green	Cambridgeshire	52.16°N 00.42°E	TL6655
Widham	Wiltshire	51.59°N 01.87°W	SU0988
Widley	City of Portsmouth	50.84°N 01.04°W	SU6706
Widmer End	Buckinghamshire	51.65°N 00.72°W	SU8896
Widmerpool	Nottinghamshire	52.84°N 01.06°W	SK6328
Widmoor	Buckinghamshire	51.56°N 00.68°W	SU9186
Widmore	Bromley	51.40°N 00.02°E	TQ4169
Widnes	Cheshire	53.35°N 02.73°W	SJ5185
Widworthy	Devon	50.78°N 03.12°W	SY2199
Wierton	Kent	51.21°N 00.54°E	TQ7849
Wig	Powys	52.47°N 03.31°W	SO1187
Wigan	Wigan	53.54°N 02.63°W	SD5805
Wiganthorpe	North Yorkshire	54.14°N 00.99°W	SE6672
Wigbeth	Dorset	50.86°N 01.94°W	SU0407
Wigborough	Somerset	50.93°N 02.79°W	ST4415
Wig Fach	Bridgend	51.48°N 03.67°W	SS8477
Wiggaton	Devon	50.72°N 03.27°W	SY1093
Wiggenhall St Germans	Norfolk	52.70°N 00.35°E	TF5914
Wiggenhall St Mary Magdalen	Norfolk	52.67°N 00.35°E	TF5911
Wiggenhall St Mary the Virgin	Norfolk	52.69°N 00.33°E	TF5813
Wiggenhall St Peter	Norfolk	52.69°N 00.36°E	TF6013
Wiggens Green	Essex	52.05°N 00.41°E	TL6642
Wigginstall	Staffordshire	53.13°N 01.86°W	SK0960
Wigginton	Hertfordshire	51.78°N 00.65°W	SP9310
Wigginton	Oxfordshire	51.99°N 01.44°W	SP3833
Wigginton	Shropshire	52.90°N 02.99°W	SJ3335
Wigginton	Staffordshire	52.65°N 01.70°W	SK2006
Wigginton	York	54.01°N 01.10°W	SE5958
Wigginton Bottom	Hertfordshire	51.77°N 00.65°W	SP9309
Wigginton Heath	Oxfordshire	52.01°N 01.44°W	SP3835
Wigglesworth	North Yorkshire	54.00°N 02.30°W	SD8056
Wiggonby	Cumbria	54.86°N 03.10°W	NY2953
Wiggonholt	West Sussex	50.93°N 00.49°W	TQ0616
Wighill	North Yorkshire	53.90°N 01.28°W	SE4746
Wighton	Norfolk	52.91°N 00.88°E	TF9439
Wightwick Manor	Staffordshire	52.57°N 02.20°W	SO8698
Wigley	Derbyshire	53.23°N 01.53°W	SK3171
Wigley	Hampshire	50.94°N 01.54°W	SU3216
Wigmarsh	Shropshire	52.81°N 02.93°W	SJ3725
Wigmore	Herefordshire	52.31°N 02.86°W	SO4169
Wigmore	Kent	51.34°N 00.58°E	TQ8064
Wigsley	Nottinghamshire	53.22°N 00.71°W	SK8670
Wigsthorpe	Northamptonshire	52.42°N 00.47°W	TL0482
Wigston	Leicestershire	52.58°N 01.11°W	SP6099
Wigston Magna	Leicestershire	52.57°N 01.11°W	SP6098
Wigston Parva	Leicestershire	52.49°N 01.32°W	SP4689
Wigthorpe	Nottinghamshire	53.34°N 01.11°W	SK5983
Wigtoft	Lincolnshire	52.90°N 00.12°W	TF2636
Wigton	Cumbria	54.82°N 03.16°W	NY2548
Wigtown	Dumfries and Galloway	54.86°N 04.44°W	NX4355
Wigtwizzle	Sheffield	53.45°N 01.64°W	SK2495
Wike	Leeds	53.87°N 01.49°W	SE3342
Wike Well End	Doncaster	53.60°N 00.95°W	SE6912

=== Wil-Wim ===
Location	Locality	Coordinates (links to map & photo sources)	OS grid reference
Wilbarston	Northamptonshire	52.48°N 00.80°W	SP8188
Wilberfoss	East Riding of Yorkshire	53.94°N 00.88°W	SE7350
Wilberlee	Kirklees	53.62°N 01.91°W	SE0614
Wilburton	Cambridgeshire	52.34°N 00.17°E	TL4874
Wilby	Norfolk	52.46°N 00.98°E	TM0389
Wilby	Northamptonshire	52.28°N 00.74°W	SP8666
Wilby	Suffolk	52.30°N 01.28°E	TM2472
Wilcot	Wiltshire	51.33°N 01.80°W	SU1460
Wilcott	Shropshire	52.75°N 02.93°W	SJ3718
Wilcott Marsh	Shropshire	52.74°N 02.92°W	SJ3817
Wilcove	Cornwall	50.38°N 04.20°W	SX4356
Wilcrick	City of Newport	51.58°N 02.86°W	ST4088
Wilday Green	Derbyshire	53.26°N 01.52°W	SK3274
Wildboarclough	Cheshire	53.20°N 02.03°W	SJ9868
Wilden	Bedfordshire	52.18°N 00.40°W	TL0955
Wilden	Worcestershire	52.34°N 02.26°W	SO8272
Wildern	Hampshire	50.91°N 01.31°W	SU4813
Wildernesse	Kent	51.27°N 00.20°E	TQ5455
Wilderspool	Cheshire	53.36°N 02.58°W	SJ6186
Wilderswood	Bolton	53.60°N 02.54°W	SD6412
Wilde Street	Suffolk	52.37°N 00.49°E	TL7078
Wildhern	Hampshire	51.24°N 01.49°W	SU3550
Wildhill	Hertfordshire	51.73°N 00.17°W	TL2606
Wildmanbridge	South Lanarkshire	55.75°N 03.86°W	NS8353
Wild Mill	Bridgend	51.51°N 03.58°W	SS9081
Wildmoor	Hampshire	51.29°N 01.02°W	SU6856
Wildmoor	Oxfordshire	51.67°N 01.29°W	SU4998
Wildmoor	Worcestershire	52.37°N 02.07°W	SO9575
Wildridings	Berkshire	51.40°N 00.76°W	SU8668
Wildsworth	West Lindsey	53.46°N 00.79°W	SK8097
Wildwood	Staffordshire	52.77°N 02.09°W	SJ9420
Wilfholme	East Riding of Yorkshire	53.92°N 00.40°W	TA050480
Wilfholme Landing	East Riding of Yorkshire	53.91°N 00.39°W	TA062470
Wilford	Nottinghamshire	52.92°N 01.16°W	SK5637
Wilgate Green	Kent	51.27°N 00.85°E	TQ9957
Wilkesley	Cheshire	52.96°N 02.56°W	SJ6241
Wilkieston	West Lothian	55.89°N 03.40°W	NT1268
Wilkin Throop	Somerset	51.00°N 02.45°W	ST6823
Wilksby	Lincolnshire	53.14°N 00.08°W	TF2862
Willacy Lane End	Lancashire	53.80°N 02.80°W	SD4735
Willand	Devon	50.88°N 03.38°W	ST0310
Willand	Somerset	50.91°N 03.15°W	ST1913
Willand Moor	Devon	50.89°N 03.36°W	ST0411
Willard's Hill	East Sussex	50.99°N 00.43°E	TQ7124
Willaston (Cheshire East)	Cheshire	53.06°N 02.49°W	SJ6752
Willaston (Cheshire West)	Cheshire	53.28°N 03.00°W	SJ3377
Willaston	Shropshire	52.91°N 02.61°W	SJ5935
Willen	Milton Keynes	52.06°N 00.73°W	SP8741
Willenhall	Coventry	52.38°N 01.47°W	SP3676
Willenhall	Walsall	52.58°N 02.06°W	SO9698
Willerby	East Riding of Yorkshire	53.75°N 00.45°W	TA0230
Willerby	North Yorkshire	54.19°N 00.46°W	TA0079
Willersey	Gloucestershire	52.04°N 01.85°W	SP1039
Willersley	Herefordshire	52.11°N 03.00°W	SO3147
Willesborough	Kent	51.13°N 00.88°E	TR0241
Willesborough Lees	Kent	51.14°N 00.90°E	TR0342
Willesden	Brent	51.54°N 00.24°W	TQ2284
Willesden Green	Brent	51.53°N 00.24°W	TQ2283
Willesley	Leicestershire	52.72°N 01.49°W	SK3414
Willesley	Wiltshire	51.59°N 02.21°W	ST8588
Willett	Somerset	51.08°N 03.28°W	ST1033
Willey	Shropshire	52.58°N 02.48°W	SO6799
Willey	Warwickshire	52.45°N 01.28°W	SP4984
Willey Green	Surrey	51.25°N 00.66°W	SU9351
Willhayne	Somerset	50.88°N 02.98°W	ST3110
Williamhope	Scottish Borders	55.58°N 02.93°W	NT4133
Williamscot	Oxfordshire	52.10°N 01.30°W	SP4845
Williamsetter	Shetland Islands	59.97°N 01.32°W	HU3821
William's Green	Suffolk	52.04°N 00.88°E	TL9842
Williamslee	Scottish Borders	55.67°N 03.09°W	NT3143
Williamstown	Rhondda, Cynon, Taff	51.60°N 03.44°W	ST0090
Williamthorpe	Derbyshire	53.18°N 01.37°W	SK4265
Williamwood	East Renfrewshire	55.78°N 04.29°W	NS5657
Willian	Hertfordshire	51.95°N 00.22°W	TL2230
Willingale	Essex	51.73°N 00.30°E	TL5907
Willingcott	Devon	51.16°N 04.17°W	SS4843
Willingdon	East Sussex	50.79°N 00.24°E	TQ5802
Willingham	Cambridgeshire	52.31°N 00.05°E	TL4070
Willingham St Mary	Suffolk	52.40°N 01.57°E	TM4384
Willingham by Stow	Lincolnshire	53.34°N 00.69°W	SK8784
Willingham Green	Cambridgeshire	52.16°N 00.36°E	TL6254
Willington	Bedfordshire	52.12°N 00.37°W	TL1149
Willington	Derbyshire	52.84°N 01.57°W	SK2928
Willington	Durham	54.71°N 01.70°W	NZ1935
Willington	Kent	51.24°N 00.54°E	TQ7853
Willington	North Tyneside	54.99°N 01.51°W	NZ3167
Willington	Warwickshire	52.04°N 01.62°W	SP2639
Willington Corner	Cheshire	53.18°N 02.70°W	SJ5366
Willington Quay	North Tyneside	54.98°N 01.50°W	NZ3266
Willisham	Suffolk	52.10°N 01.02°E	TM0750
Willisham Tye	Suffolk	52.11°N 01.00°E	TM0651
Willitoft	East Riding of Yorkshire	53.80°N 00.87°W	SE7435
Williton	Somerset	51.16°N 03.33°W	ST0741
Willoughby	Lincolnshire	53.21°N 00.18°E	TF4671
Willoughby	Warwickshire	52.29°N 01.25°W	SP5167
Willoughby Hills	Lincolnshire	52.98°N 00.01°W	TF3445
Willoughby on the Wolds	Nottinghamshire	52.81°N 01.06°W	SK6325
Willoughby Waterleys	Leicestershire	52.52°N 01.16°W	SP5792
Willoughton	Lincolnshire	53.42°N 00.60°W	SK9393
Willowbank	Buckinghamshire	51.55°N 00.48°W	TQ0585
Willow Green	Cheshire	53.27°N 02.60°W	SJ6076
Willow Green	Worcestershire	52.21°N 02.35°W	SO7658
Willow Holme	Cumbria	54.89°N 02.95°W	NY3956
Willows	Bolton	53.56°N 02.45°W	SD7008
Willows Green	Essex	51.84°N 00.49°E	TL7219
Willowtown	Blaenau Gwent	51.78°N 03.21°W	SO1610
Will Row	Lincolnshire	53.35°N 00.17°E	TF4586
Willsbridge	South Gloucestershire	51.42°N 02.49°W	ST6670
Willslock	Staffordshire	52.86°N 01.89°W	SK0730
Willstone	Shropshire	52.55°N 02.75°W	SO4995
Wilmcote	Warwickshire	52.22°N 01.76°W	SP1658
Wilmington	Bath and North East Somerset	51.35°N 02.44°W	ST6962
Wilmington	Devon	50.78°N 03.12°W	SY2199
Wilmington	East Sussex	50.81°N 00.18°E	TQ5404
Wilmington	Kent	51.41°N 00.19°E	TQ5371
Wilmington Green	East Sussex	50.82°N 00.18°E	TQ5405
Wilminstone	Devon	50.56°N 04.13°W	SX4976
Wilmorton	City of Derby	52.907°N 01.445°W	SK3734
Wilmslow	Cheshire	53.31°N 02.24°W	SJ8480
Wilmslow Park	Cheshire	53.32°N 02.22°W	SJ8581
Wilnecote	Staffordshire	52.60°N 01.67°W	SK2201
Wilney Green	Norfolk	52.38°N 01.02°E	TM0681
Wilpshire	Lancashire	53.78°N 02.48°W	SD6832
Wilsden	Bradford	53.82°N 01.86°W	SE0936
Wilsden Hill	Bradford	53.82°N 01.87°W	SE0836
Wilsford	Lincolnshire	52.97°N 00.51°W	TF0043
Wilsford (near Amesbury)	Wiltshire	51.15°N 01.81°W	SU1339
Wilsford (near Pewsey)	Wiltshire	51.31°N 01.85°W	SU1057
Wilsham	Devon	51.21°N 03.79°W	SS7548
Wilshaw	Kirklees	53.57°N 01.83°W	SE1109
Wilsic	Doncaster	53.45°N 01.15°W	SK5696
Wilsill	North Yorkshire	54.07°N 01.72°W	SE1864
Wilsley Green	Kent	51.09°N 00.52°E	TQ7736
Wilsley Pound	Kent	51.10°N 00.54°E	TQ7837
Wilsom	Hampshire	51.14°N 00.97°W	SU7239
Wilson	Herefordshire	51.90°N 02.65°W	SO5523
Wilson	Leicestershire	52.81°N 01.40°W	SK4024
Wilsonhall	Angus	56.54°N 02.78°W	NO5239
Wilsontown	South Lanarkshire	55.77°N 03.69°W	NS9455
Wilstead	Bedfordshire	52.07°N 00.45°W	TL0643
Wilsthorpe	Derbyshire	52.89°N 01.30°W	SK4733
Wilsthorpe	East Riding of Yorkshire	54.06°N 00.21°W	TA169641
Wilsthorpe	Lincolnshire	52.70°N 00.38°W	TF0913
Wilstone	Hertfordshire	51.81°N 00.69°W	SP9014
Wilstone Green	Hertfordshire	51.80°N 00.69°W	SP9013
Wilthorpe	Barnsley	53.55°N 01.51°W	SE3207
Wilton	Cumbria	54.48°N 03.49°W	NY0311
Wilton	Herefordshire	51.91°N 02.61°W	SO5824
Wilton	North Yorkshire	54.22°N 00.68°W	SE8682
Wilton	Redcar and Cleveland	54.56°N 01.10°W	NZ5819
Wilton	Scottish Borders	55.42°N 02.80°W	NT4915
Wilton	Somerset	51.00°N 03.11°W	ST2223
Wilton (near Marlborough)	Wiltshire	51.34°N 01.62°W	SU2661
Wilton (near Salisbury)	Wiltshire	51.07°N 01.87°W	SU0931
Wilton Park	Buckinghamshire	51.60°N 00.61°W	SU9690
Wiltown	Devon	50.93°N 03.18°W	ST1716
Wiltown	Somerset	51.01°N 02.88°W	ST3824
Wimbish	Essex	51.99°N 00.31°E	TL5936
Wimbish Green	Essex	51.99°N 00.32°E	TL6035
Wimblebury	Staffordshire	52.69°N 01.98°W	SK0111
Wimbledon	Merton	51.42°N 00.21°W	TQ2471
Wimble Hill	Hampshire	51.20°N 00.85°W	SU8046
Wimblington	Cambridgeshire	52.50°N 00.07°E	TL4192
Wimbolds Trafford	Cheshire	53.24°N 02.84°W	SJ4472
Wimborne Minster	Dorset	50.79°N 01.98°W	SU0100
Wimborne St Giles	Dorset	50.90°N 01.95°W	SU0312
Wimbotsham	Norfolk	52.61°N 00.37°E	TF6105
Wimpson	City of Southampton	50.92°N 01.46°W	SU3814
Wimpstone	Warwickshire	52.13°N 01.69°W	SP2148

=== Win ===
Location	Locality	Coordinates (links to map & photo sources)	OS grid reference
Wincanton	Somerset	51.05°N 02.41°W	ST7128
Winceby	Lincolnshire	53.19°N 00.04°W	TF3168
Wincham	Cheshire	53.27°N 02.49°W	SJ6775
Winchburgh	West Lothian	55.95°N 03.47°W	NT0874
Winchcombe	Gloucestershire	51.95°N 01.97°W	SP0228
Winchelsea	East Sussex	50.92°N 00.70°E	TQ9017
Winchelsea Beach	East Sussex	50.91°N 00.71°E	TQ9116
Winchester	Hampshire	51.05°N 01.31°W	SU4829
Winchestown	Blaenau Gwent	51.78°N 03.19°W	SO1810
Winchet Hill	Kent	51.13°N 00.47°E	TQ7340
Winchfield	Hampshire	51.28°N 00.91°W	SU7654
Winchfield Hurst	Hampshire	51.27°N 00.89°W	SU7753
Winchmore Hill	Buckinghamshire	51.64°N 00.65°W	SU9395
Winchmore Hill	Enfield	51.62°N 00.10°W	TQ3194
Wincle	Cheshire	53.19°N 02.07°W	SJ9566
Wincobank	Sheffield	53.41°N 01.42°W	SK3891
Winder	Cumbria	54.53°N 03.48°W	NY0417
Windermere	Cumbria	54.37°N 02.90°W	SD4198
Winderton	Warwickshire	52.05°N 01.53°W	SP3240
Windhill	Bradford	53.82°N 01.77°W	SE1537
Windhill	Doncaster	53.49°N 01.27°W	SE4800
Windhill	Highland	57.49°N 04.45°W	NH5348
Wind Hill	Cumbria	54.13°N 03.11°W	SD2771
Wind Hill	Pembrokeshire	51.64°N 04.79°W	SS0798
Windhouse	Shetland Islands	60.60°N 01.10°W	HU4991
Winding Wood	Berkshire	51.42°N 01.45°W	SU3870
Windle Hill	Cheshire	53.28°N 03.05°W	SJ3077
Windlehurst	Stockport	53.37°N 02.07°W	SJ9586
Windlesham	Surrey	51.35°N 00.66°W	SU9363
Windley	Derbyshire	53.00°N 01.55°W	SK3045
Windmill	Cornwall	50.52°N 04.97°W	SW8974
Windmill	Flintshire	53.23°N 03.20°W	SJ2071
Windmill Hill	City of Bristol	51.43°N 02.59°W	ST5971
Windmill Hill	Cheshire	53.33°N 02.67°W	SJ5582
Windmill Hill	East Sussex	50.88641°N 0.34044°E	TQ6412
Windmill Hill	Herefordshire	52.13°N 02.13°W	SO9149
Windmill Hill	Kent	51.37°N 00.62°E	TQ8367
Windmill Hill	Somerset	50.93°N 02.98°W	ST3116
Windmill Hill	Wakefield	53.65°N 01.42°W	SE3818
Windrush	Gloucestershire	51.81°N 01.72°W	SP1913
Windsor	Berkshire	51.47°N 00.61°W	SU9676
Windsor	North Lincolnshire	53.59°N 00.85°W	SE7612
Windsoredge	Gloucestershire	51.69°N 02.23°W	SO8400
Windsor Green	Suffolk	52.15°N 00.76°E	TL8954
Windwhistle	Somerset	50.87°N 02.89°W	ST3709
Windy Arbor	Knowsley	53.39°N 02.81°W	SJ4689
Windy Arbour	Warwickshire	52.33°N 01.57°W	SP2971
Windydoors	Scottish Borders	55.64°N 02.90°W	NT4339
Windyedge	Aberdeenshire	57.02°N 02.18°W	NO8993
Windygates	Fife	56.18°N 03.06°W	NO3400
Windyharbour	Cheshire	53.22°N 02.27°W	SJ8270
Windy Hill	Wrexham	53.07°N 03.04°W	SJ3054
Windyknowe	West Lothian	55.89°N 03.66°W	NS9668
Windy Nook	Gateshead	54.93°N 01.58°W	NZ2760
Windyridge	Moray	57.68°N 03.29°W	NJ2367
Windy-Yett	East Ayrshire	55.71°N 04.43°W	NS4750
Wineham	West Sussex	50.96°N 00.24°W	TQ2320
Winestead	East Riding of Yorkshire	53.69°N 00.04°W	TA2924
Winewall	Lancashire	53.84°N 02.13°W	SD9139
Winfarthing	Norfolk	52.42°N 01.08°E	TM1085
Winford	Isle of Wight	50.65°N 01.20°W	SZ5684
Winford	North Somerset	51.38°N 02.66°W	ST5465
Winforton	Herefordshire	52.11°N 03.03°W	SO2947
Winfrith Newburgh	Dorset	50.65°N 02.28°W	SY8084
Wing	Buckinghamshire	51.88°N 00.72°W	SP8822
Wing	Rutland	52.61°N 00.68°W	SK8903
Wingate	Durham	54.72°N 01.38°W	NZ4037
Wingates	Bolton	53.55°N 02.52°W	SD6507
Wingerworth	Derbyshire	53.19°N 01.44°W	SK3767
Wingfield	Bedfordshire	51.92°N 00.54°W	TL0026
Wingfield	Rotherham	53.45°N 01.39°W	SK4095
Wingfield	Suffolk	52.33°N 01.25°E	TM2276
Wingfield	Wiltshire	51.30°N 02.25°W	ST8256
Wingfield Green	Suffolk	52.34°N 01.24°E	TM2177
Wingfield Park	Derbyshire	53.07°N 01.44°W	SK3753
Wingham	Kent	51.26°N 01.21°E	TR2457
Wingham Green	Kent	51.26°N 01.19°E	TR2357
Wingham Well	Kent	51.25°N 01.19°E	TR2356
Wingmore	Kent	51.17°N 01.11°E	TR1846
Wingrave	Buckinghamshire	51.85°N 00.75°W	SP8618
Winkburn	Nottinghamshire	53.11°N 00.94°W	SK7158
Winkfield	Berkshire	51.44°N 00.70°W	SU9072
Winkfield Row	Berkshire	51.42°N 00.72°W	SU8970
Winkhill	Staffordshire	53.05°N 01.91°W	SK0651
Winkhurst Green	Kent	51.22°N 00.13°E	TQ4949
Winklebury	Hampshire	51.26°N 01.12°W	SU6152
Winkleigh	Devon	50.85°N 03.94°W	SS6308
Winksley	North Yorkshire	54.13°N 01.61°W	SE2571
Winkton	Dorset	50.76°N 01.77°W	SZ1696
Winlaton	Gateshead	54.95°N 01.72°W	NZ1862
Winlaton Mill	Gateshead	54.93°N 01.72°W	NZ1860
Winllan	Powys	52.78°N 03.17°W	SJ2121
Winmarleigh Moss	Lancashire	53.91°N 02.85°W	SD4447
Winnal	Herefordshire	52.00°N 02.80°W	SO4534
Winnal Common	Herefordshire	52.00°N 02.80°W	SO4534
Winnall	Hampshire	51.06°N 01.30°W	SU4930
Winnall	Worcestershire	52.30°N 02.28°W	SO8167
Winnard's Perch	Cornwall	50.45°N 04.93°W	SW9266
Winnersh	Berkshire	51.42°N 00.89°W	SU7770
Winnington	Cheshire	53.26°N 02.54°W	SJ6474
Winnington	Staffordshire	52.93°N 02.41°W	SJ7238
Winnington Green	Shropshire	52.69°N 03.02°W	SJ3111
Winnothdale	Staffordshire	52.95°N 01.95°W	SK0340
Winscales	Cumbria	54.62°N 03.51°W	NY0226
Winscombe	North Somerset	51.30°N 02.83°W	ST4257
Winsdon Hill	Luton	51.87°N 00.44°W	TL0721
Winsford	Cheshire	53.19°N 02.52°W	SJ6566
Winsford	Somerset	51.09°N 03.57°W	SS9034
Winsham	Devon	51.12°N 04.15°W	SS4938
Winsham	Somerset	50.85°N 02.89°W	ST3706
Winshill	Staffordshire	52.80°N 01.61°W	SK2623
Winsh-wen	Swansea	51.64°N 03.90°W	SS6896
Winsick	Derbyshire	53.20°N 01.40°W	SK4068
Winskill	Cumbria	54.69°N 02.65°W	NY5834
Winslade	Devon	50.93°N 04.30°W	SS3818
Winslade	Hampshire	51.22°N 01.07°W	SU6548
Winsley	North Yorkshire	54.04°N 01.65°W	SE2361
Winsley	Wiltshire	51.35°N 02.29°W	ST8061
Winslow	Buckinghamshire	51.93°N 00.89°W	SP7627
Winslow Mill	Herefordshire	52.02°N 02.55°W	SO6236
Winson	Gloucestershire	51.77°N 01.87°W	SP0908
Winson Green	Birmingham	52.49°N 01.94°W	SP0488
Winsor	Hampshire	50.92°N 01.56°W	SU3114
Winstanley	Wigan	53.52°N 02.68°W	SD5503
Winstanleys	Wigan	53.57°N 02.63°W	SD5809
Winster	Cumbria	54.32°N 02.90°W	SD4193
Winster	Derbyshire	53.13°N 01.64°W	SK2460
Winston	Durham	54.53°N 01.80°W	NZ1316
Winston	Suffolk	52.20°N 01.18°E	TM1861
Winstone	Gloucestershire	51.77°N 02.05°W	SO9609
Winswell	Devon	50.89°N 04.14°W	SS4913
Winterborne Came	Dorset	50.69°N 02.42°W	SY7088
Winterborne Clenston	Dorset	50.81°N 02.24°W	ST8302
Winterborne Herringston	Dorset	50.69°N 02.45°W	SY6888
Winterborne Houghton	Dorset	50.83°N 02.27°W	ST8104
Winterborne Kingston	Dorset	50.77°N 02.19°W	SY8697
Winterborne Monkton	Dorset	50.68°N 02.46°W	SY6787
Winterborne Muston	Dorset	50.77°N 02.18°W	SY8797
Winterborne Stickland	Dorset	50.83°N 02.24°W	ST8304
Winterborne Tomson	Dorset	50.77°N 02.17°W	SY8897
Winterborne Whitechurch	Dorset	50.79°N 02.24°W	ST8300
Winterborne Zelston	Dorset	50.77°N 02.15°W	SY8997
Winterbourne	Berkshire	51.44°N 01.35°W	SU4572
Winterbourne	Kent	51.27°N 00.95°E	TR0657
Winterbourne	South Gloucestershire	51.51°N 02.50°W	ST6580
Winterbourne Abbas	Dorset	50.70°N 02.55°W	SY6190
Winterbourne Bassett	Wiltshire	51.46°N 01.85°W	SU1074
Winterbourne Dauntsey	Wiltshire	51.10°N 01.75°W	SU1734
Winterbourne Down	South Gloucestershire	51.50°N 02.50°W	ST6579
Winterbourne Earls	Wiltshire	51.10°N 01.75°W	SU1734
Winterbourne Gunner	Wiltshire	51.11°N 01.74°W	SU1835
Winterbourne Monkton	Wiltshire	51.43°N 01.87°W	SU0971
Winterbourne Steepleton	Dorset	50.69°N 02.53°W	SY6289
Winterbourne Stoke	Wiltshire	51.16°N 01.90°W	SU0741
Winterbrook	Oxfordshire	51.58°N 01.13°W	SU6088
Winterburn	North Yorkshire	54.01°N 02.10°W	SD9358
Winterfield	Bath and North East Somerset	51.29°N 02.50°W	ST6555
Winter Gardens	Essex	51.52°N 00.57°E	TQ7984
Winterhay Green	Somerset	50.93°N 02.92°W	ST3515
Winterhead	North Somerset	51.30°N 02.81°W	ST4357
Winteringham	North Lincolnshire	53.68°N 00.60°W	SE9222
Winterley	Cheshire	53.10°N 02.38°W	SJ7457
Wintersett	Wakefield	53.63°N 01.42°W	SE3815
Wintershill	Hampshire	50.95°N 01.26°W	SU5218
Winterton	North Lincolnshire	53.65°N 00.60°W	SE9218
Winterton-on-Sea	Norfolk	52.71°N 01.68°E	TG4919
Winter Well	Somerset	50.97°N 03.06°W	ST2520
Winthorpe	Lincolnshire	53.15°N 00.33°E	TF5665
Winthorpe	Nottinghamshire	53.09°N 00.79°W	SK8156
Winton	Bournemouth	50.73°N 01.88°W	SZ0893
Winton	Cumbria	54.48°N 02.34°W	NY7810
Winton	East Sussex	50.80°N 00.15°E	TQ5203
Winton	North Yorkshire	54.35°N 01.37°W	SE4196
Winton	Salford	53.47°N 02.37°W	SJ7598
Wintringham	Cambridgeshire	52.22°N 00.24°W	TL2060
Wintringham	North Yorkshire	54.14°N 00.65°W	SE8873
Winwick	Cambridgeshire	52.40°N 00.38°W	TL1080
Winwick	Cheshire	53.42°N 02.60°W	SJ6092
Winwick	Northamptonshire	52.35°N 01.09°W	SP6273
Winwick Quay	Cheshire	53.41°N 02.60°W	SJ6091
Winyard's Gap	Dorset	50.85°N 02.72°W	ST4906
Winyates	Worcestershire	52.30°N 01.89°W	SP0767
Winyates Green	Worcestershire	52.30°N 01.88°W	SP0867
