= Winder =

Winder may refer to:

== Mechanical devices ==
- Winding machine, a machine for wrapping string, twine, cord, thread, yarn, rope, wire, ribbon, tape, etc. onto a spool, bobbin, reel, etc.
- Winder or motor drive, a device for automatically (re-) winding film in a manual camera
- Winder or hoist, used in underground mining
- A device for transferring energy into a mechanical storage such as mainsprings

== Places ==
- Winder, Cumbria, a location in the United Kingdom
- Winder, Georgia, United States
- Winder, Idaho, United States
- Winder Dam, a dam on the Winder River in Lasbela District, Balochistan, Pakistan
- Winder, a union council in Lasbela District, Balochistan, Pakistan
- Lake Winder, Florida, United States, United States
- Ray Winder Field, a baseball park in Little Rock, Arkansas

== People ==
- Winder (surname), including list of persons bearing the name
- Winder (given name), including list of persons with the name

== Other uses ==
- Winder (band), a German-Danish band, active between 1984 and 1985
- Winder (step), a type of stairway step
- Winder Farms, online grocer
- USS PCS-1376, US Navy ship given the name Winder toward the end of its period of service
- Westchester Interfaith/Interagency Network for Disaster and Emergency Recovery, a disaster recovery organization in Westchester County, New York
- Winder Building, an office building in Washington, D.C., on the National Register of Historic Places

== See also ==
- Winner (disambiguation)
