= Winnall =

Winnall may refer to

- Winnall, Hampshire, a suburb of Winchester, England
- Winnall, Worcestershire, a location in England
- Winnall Moors, an area of the flood plain in Winchester city
- Sam Winnall (born 1991), English football striker
