= Give Me Your Love =

Give Me Your Love may refer to:

== Albums ==
- Give Me Your Love (Barbara Mason album), 1973
- Give Me Your Love (Sylvia Striplin album) or the title song, 1981
- Give Me Your Love, by Fame, 2003
- Give Me Your Love, by G. C. Cameron, 1983
- Give Me Your Love, by Jimmy Ye Liang Jun, 1993
- Give Me Your Love, by Sisters Love, 2006

== Songs ==
- "Give Me Your Love" (Fame song), 2003 Sweden Eurovision Song Contest entry
- "Give Me Your Love" (Sigala song), 2016
- "Give Me Your Love", by Alton Ellis and David Isaacs, 1968
- "Give Me Your Love", by Andy Kim, 1964
- "Give Me Your Love", by Anne Murray from Harmony, 1987
- "Give Me Your Love", by the Babys from Broken Heart, 1977
- "Give Me Your Love", by Bryan Adams from Bryan Adams, 1980
- "Give Me Your Love", by Don Cornell, 1955
- "Give Me Your Love", by Fun Fun, 1984
- "Give Me Your Love", by Jerry Butler, 1963
- "Give Me Your Love", by Lee Dorsey, 1962
- "Give Me Your Love", by Nat King Cole, 1959
- "Give Me Your Love", by the Real Thing, 1980
- "Give Me Your Love", by Sticks Herman
- "Give Me Your Love", by T-Connection, 1981
- "Give Me Your Love", by Winder, 1984
- "Give Me Your Love", by XTM, 2005
- "Give Me Your Love (Love Song)", by Curtis Mayfield from the Super Fly film soundtrack, 1972
