= Wigginton =

Wigginton may refer to:

== England ==
- Wigginton, Hertfordshire
- Wigginton, North Yorkshire
- Wigginton, Oxfordshire
- Wigginton, Shropshire, a location
- Wigginton, Staffordshire

== Surname ==
- Eliot Wigginton (b. 1942), American oral historian
- Giles Wigginton (16th century), English clergyman
- Lindell Wigginton (b. 1998), Canadian basketball player
- Peter D. Wigginton (1839–1890), American politician
- Randy Wigginton, American computer engineer
- Ron Wigginton (b. 1944), American artist
- Searson Wigginton (1909–1977), English cricketer
- Tracey Wigginton (b. 1965), Australian murderer
- Ty Wigginton (b. 1977), American baseball player
