= Wandilla =

Wandilla may refer to:

- HMAT Wandilla or SS Wandilla, an Australian steamship built in 1912
- Wandilla (tugboat)
- Wandilla, a gazetted homestead in Western Australia - see List of homesteads in Western Australia: Wa-We
- Wandillah, a gazetted homestead in Western Australia - see List of homesteads in Western Australia: Wa-We
