= Willow Green =

Willow Green may refer to:

- Willow Green, Cheshire, a location in England
- Willow Green, Worcestershire, a location in England
- Willow Green, a homestead in Western Australia
- Willow Green, a fictional character on the television series Ice

== See also ==
- Willows Green, a hamlet in Essex, England
