= Searson =

Searson is both a surname and a given name. Notable people with the name include:

- Harry Searson (1924–2013), English footballer
- Searson Wigginton (1909–1977), English cricketer

== See also ==
- Pearson (surname)
