= Geevor Tin Mine =

Former tin mine in Cornwall, England

Geevor
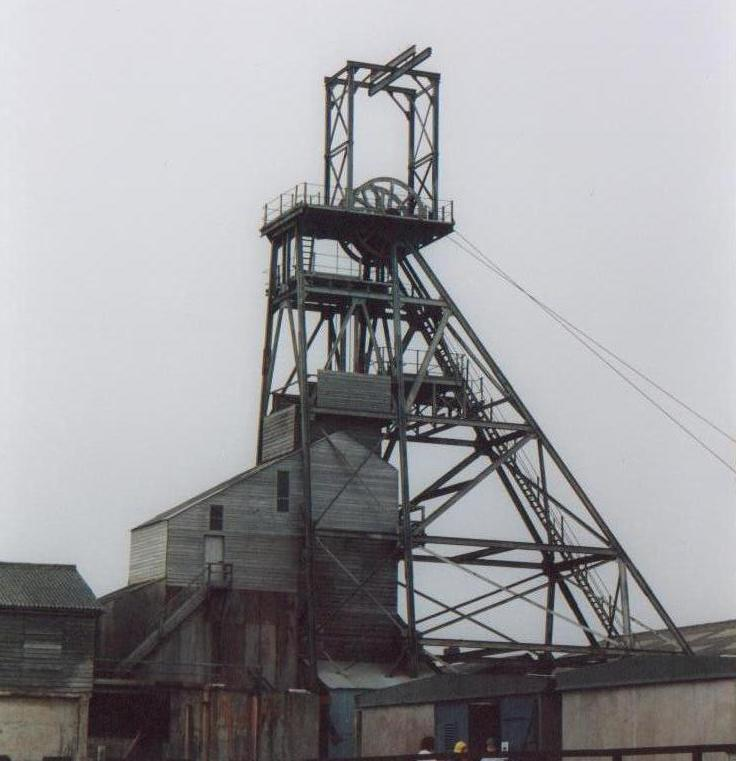
- Victory shaft headframe

- Location in Cornwall
- Location: Pendeen, Cornwall, England, United Kingdom; 50°09′09″N 005°40′33″W
- Products: Tin
- Opened: 1911
- Closed: 1990
- Website: http://www.geevor.com/

UNESCO World Heritage Site
- Type: Cultural
- Criteria: ii, iii, iv
- Designated: 2006 (30th session)
- Reference no.: 1512
- Region: Europe and North America

Geevor Tin Mine (from Cornish: Hwel an Gever, meaning "mine of the goats"), formerly North Levant Mine is a tin mine in the far west of Cornwall, England, between the villages of Pendeen and Trewellard. It was operational between 1911 and 1990 during which time it produced about 50,000 tons of black tin. It is now a museum and heritage centre left as a living history of a working tin mine. The museum is an Anchor Point of ERIH, The European Route of Industrial Heritage. Since 2006, the mine has been part of the UNESCO World Heritage Site Cornwall and West Devon Mining Landscape.

== History ==
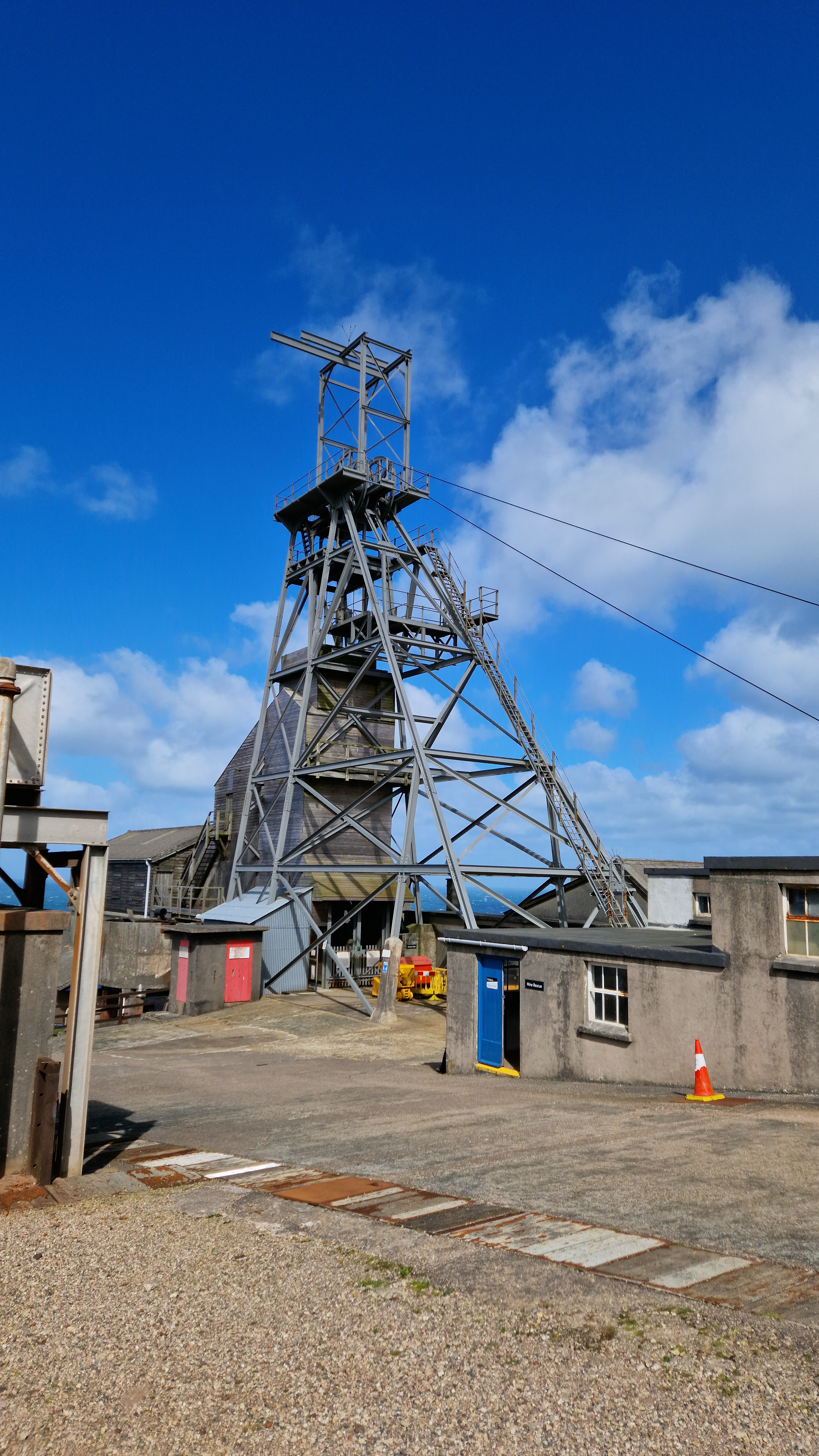
The Victory shaft headframe at Geevor in 2026

Tin and copper have been mined from the general area of Geevor since the late 18th century. It was originally a small enterprise known as Wheal an Giver, "a piece of ground occupied by goats". The area was worked under the name of East Levant Mine until 1840 and then as North Levant from 1851 to 1891 when it closed. During the 1880s as many as 176 workers were employed at the mine, but in the ten years after North Levant's closure the site saw only intermittent activity by a few miners.

At the turn of the 20th century a group of St Just miners who had emigrated to South Africa were forced to return by the outbreak of the Second Boer War. They leased the area and conducted more thorough prospecting, being encouraged enough to set up a company called Levant North (Wheal Geevor) in 1901. This was acquired by the West Australian Gold Field Company Ltd. in 1904 which brought together various mines under the name of Geevor Tin Mines Ltd. in 1911, not long after the price of tin had rapidly risen to £181 a ton in 1906 from a low of £64 in 1896.

The Wethered shaft (named after Oliver Wethered, one of the founders of the mine) was begun in 1909 and initial development occurred around it. By 1919, the works were moving west toward the coastline and the Victory shaft (named to celebrate the end of the First World War) was sunk about 540 metres to the north-west. The mine suspended operations in 1921 and again for 12 months during the tin crisis in 1930 that permanently closed many other Cornish mines. In 1944 working through Wethered shaft was discontinued, but the Victory shaft continued in use.

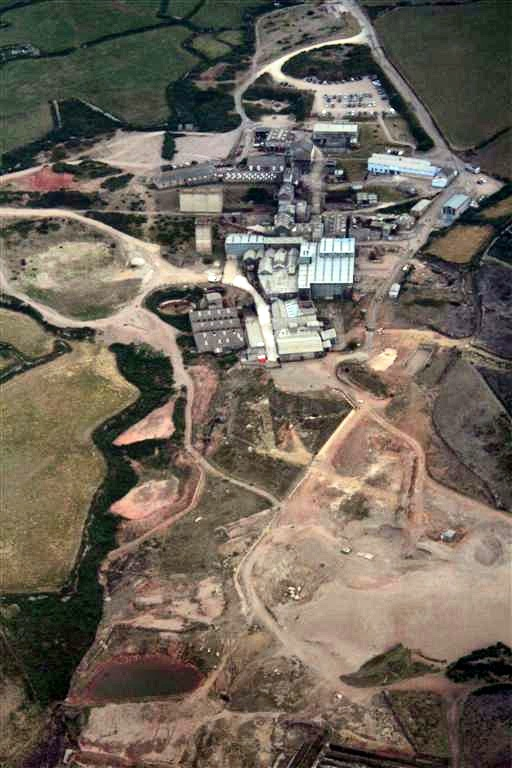
Geevor seen from the air

From the end of World War II until the early 1960s both Geevor and South Crofty found it hard to raise capital and to recruit skilled miners. Both mines took on Polish and Italian miners at this time. New investment, forward-looking management and rising tin prices in the 1960s improved matters and at this time around 270 staff were employed by the mine. During the 1960s there was much underground exploration; this included extending into the undersea workings of the Levant mine that had closed in 1930, work that was complicated by a hole in the seabed that first had to be plugged before the workings could be drained.

By the 1970s Geevor's sett covered an area of about three square miles and included Boscaswell Downs mine, Pendeen Consols and Levant mine. In 1985 the International Tin Council failed and there was a dramatic fall in the price of the metal. The mine struggled on for a few years, but closed in 1990, and the pumps were switched off in May 1991 allowing the workings to flood. The mine is not geologically exhausted of tin, but it is exhausted of tin that is recoverable economically.

During the 20th century Geevor drove over 85 miles (137 km) of tunnels from which it produced around 50,000 tons of black tin and made a profit of over £7 million. On average over a million gallons of water, a quarter of which was sea-water, was pumped from the mine daily.

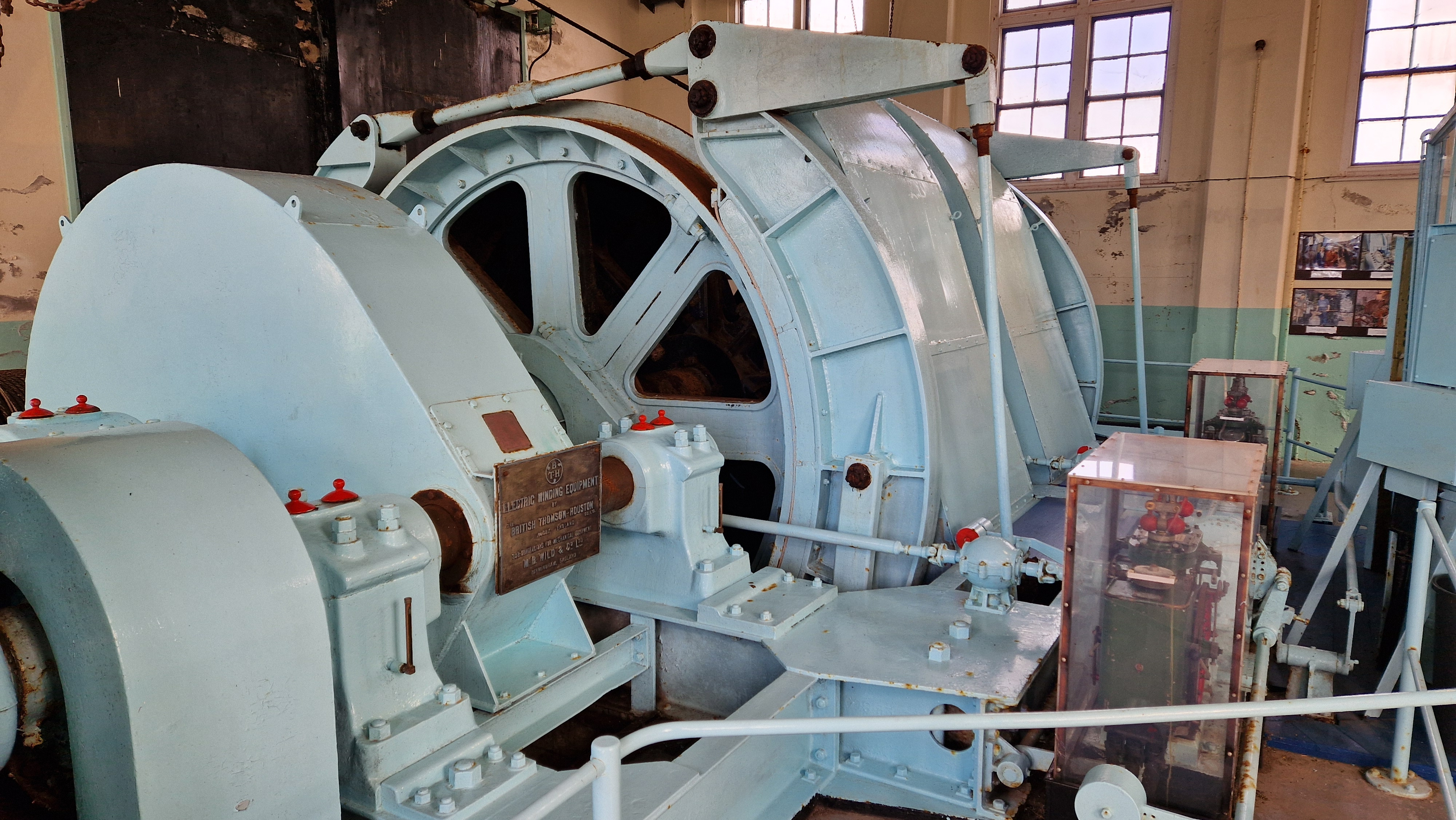
Winder at Geevor Tin Mine

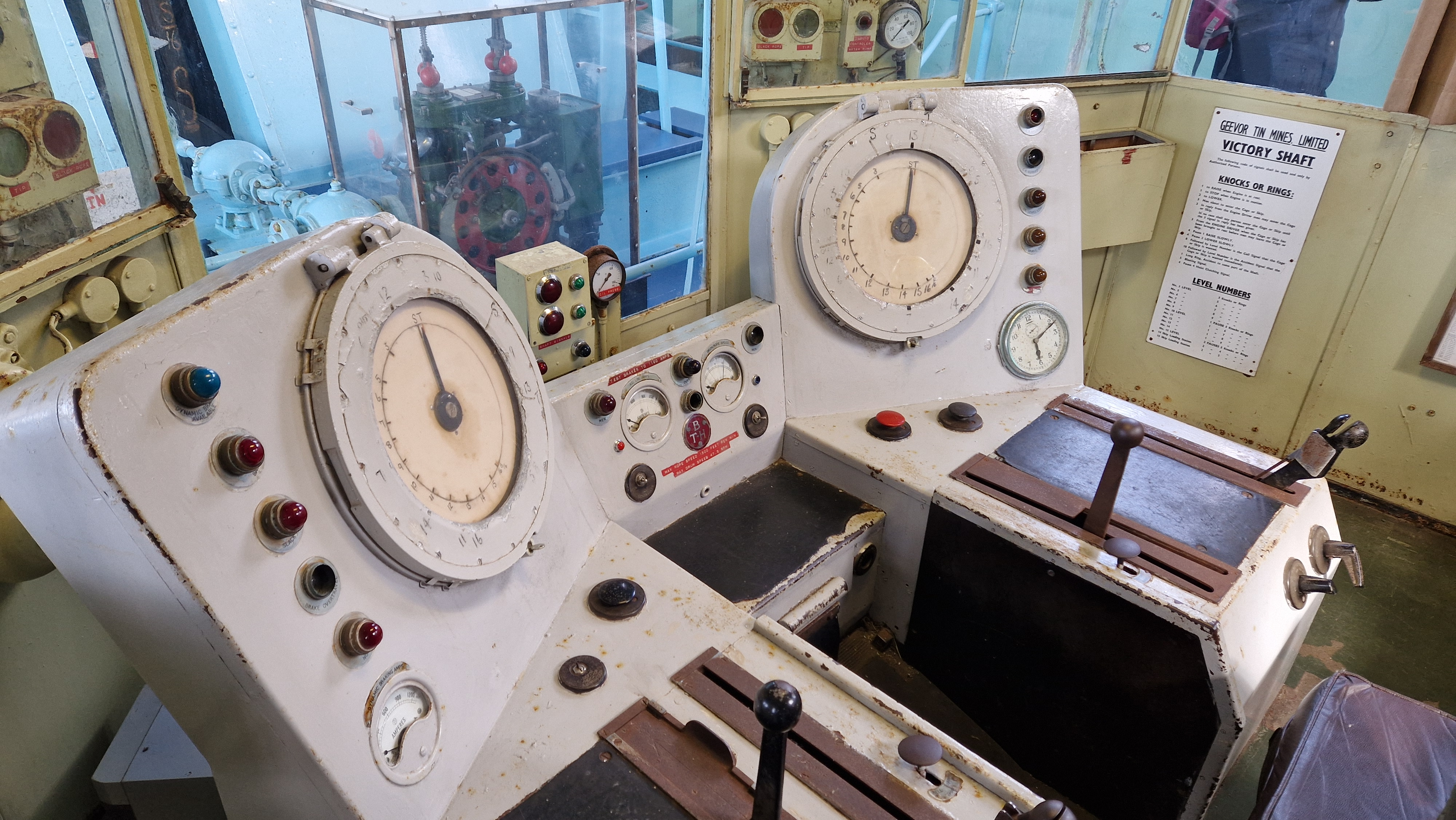
Control cabinet of the winder at Geevor Tin Mine

== Geology ==
The mine's lodes were located in an outer zone of coarse-grained biotite granite of Carboniferous age, intruded into surrounding Devonian age "killas" - a series of metamorphosed sedimentary and volcanic rocks, visible to the north west of the mine around the cliffs. As the influence of the granitic emplacement increases toward the contact zone, the killas becomes spotted with cordierite, then mica-rich phyllites and finally at the contact, banded hornfels and tourmaline schist.

The tin appears as cassiterite (with around 65-70% tin), within veins associated with quartz, tourmaline, metal sulphides and fluorite. The veins are predominantly in a north west - south east orientation and the cassiterite itself forms around 1% of the vein material.

== Tourist attraction ==
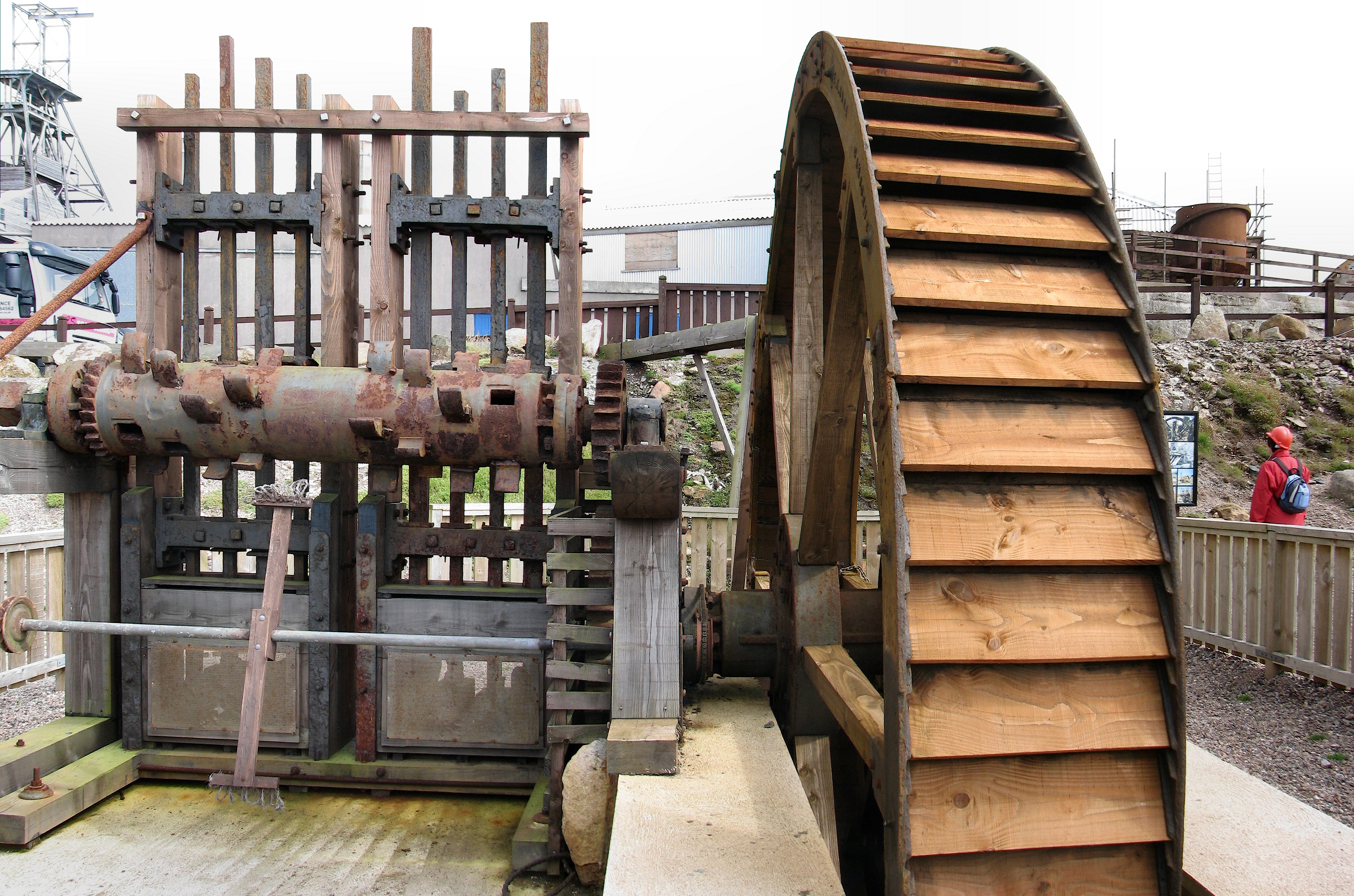
A 19th century waterwheel and set of Cornish stamps at the museum

Through the commitment of the local community and local bodies, notably Cornwall County Council and Pendeen Community Heritage, the site has remained accessible to the public. Geevor Tin Mine is now a museum and heritage centre, covering an area of 67 acres (270,000 m^{2}) which makes it the largest preserved tin mining site in Great Britain. It is an important part of the Cornwall and West Devon Mining Landscape and was recognised by UNESCO in 2006. It has been the subject of a £3.8 million improvement programme funded by the Heritage Lottery Fund, Objective One, Cornwall County Council and Penwith District Council.

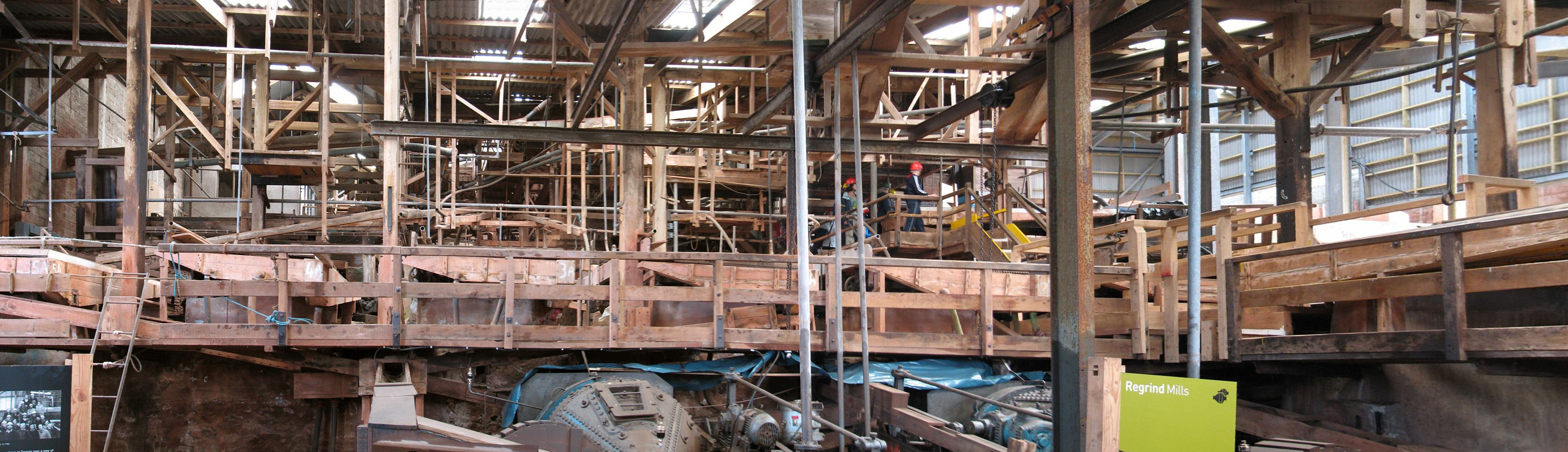
Part of the interior of the ore processing mill, open to visitors

Geevor's new Hard Rock museum is part of the final stage of this improvement programme. The museum tells the story of tin mining in Cornwall and Geevor in particular, showing what happened on the surface and underground and what life was like for those who worked there, including oral history recordings. Visitors can also walk through the mine buildings to see the original machinery and there is a guided underground tour into Wheal Mexico, an 18th-century mine. The site has a souvenir shop and a cafe that overlooks the Atlantic Ocean. There are interactive activities e.g. panning for gold and gemstones.

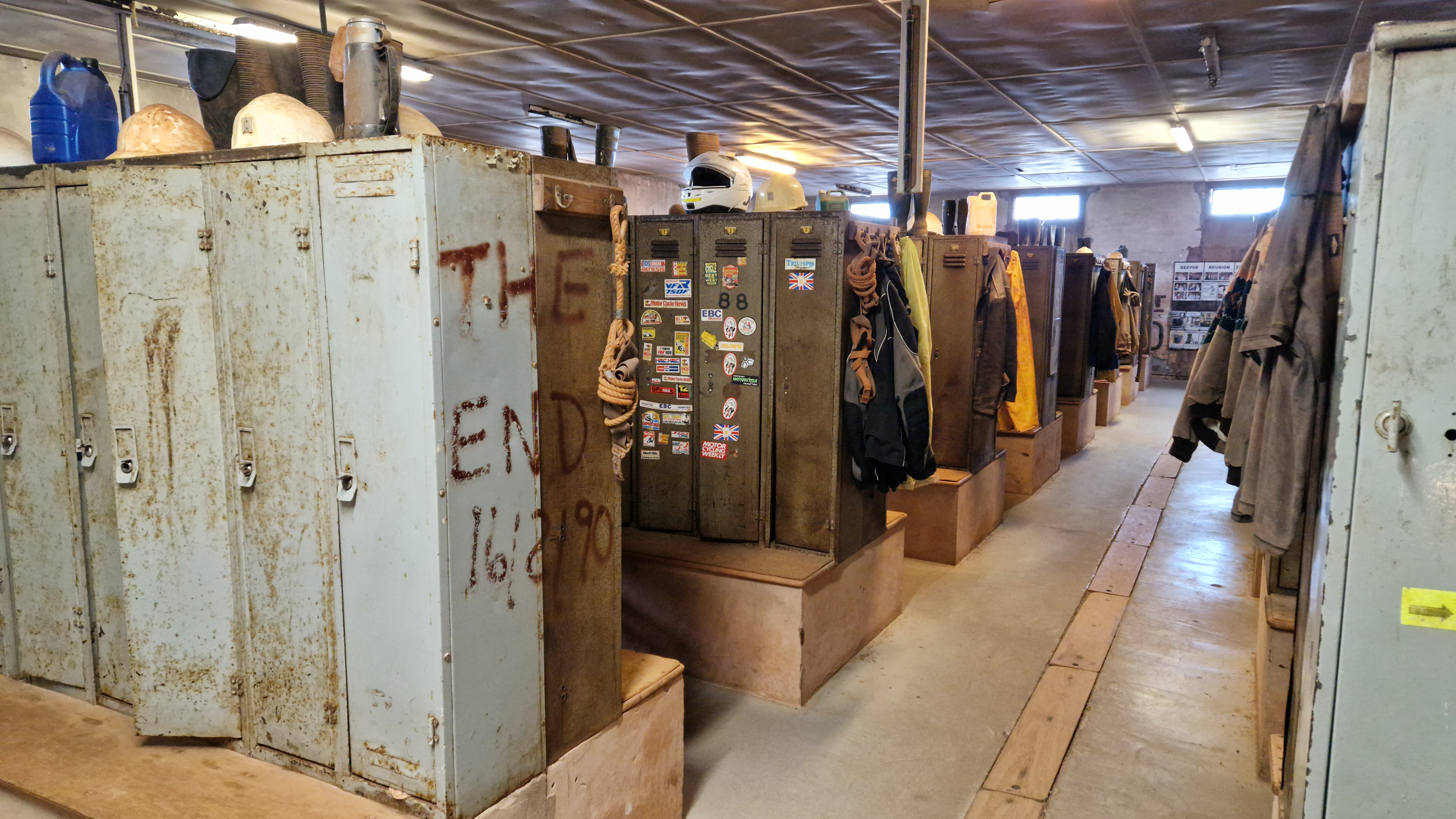
The dry preserved, as it was on the last shift in 1990

== Mineral Statistics ==
From Robert Hunt's Mineral Statistics of the United Kingdom.

Tin Production (1892–1988)
Year(s)	Black (Tons)	Value (£)
1892	17.50	944.00
1893	40.30	1,949.00
1894-1904	no-details	..
1906	14.70	1,203.00
1907-1913	no-details	..
1914	380.60	32,793.00
1914	376.00	34,431.00
1915	348.10	30,589.00
1915	353.00	30,100.00
1916	332.95	36,752.00
1916	444.00	43,350.00
1917	298.60	43,849.00
1917	416.00	56,860.00
1918	374.20	77,985.00
1918	439.00	76,514.00
1919	432.00	62,012.00
1919	432.00	69,064.00
1920	331.00	..
1921	84.00	..
1922	191.00	19,436.00
1923	381.00	52,001.00
1924	530.00	74,502.00
1925	438.00	71,257.00
1926	495.00	85,409.00
1927	609.00	96,677.00
1928	740.00	98,375.00
1929	811.00	..
1930	376.00	..
1931	91.00	5,486.00
1932	..	52,526.00
1933	..	98,387.00
1934	783.00	106,635.00
1935	877.00	111,853.00
1936	921.00	125,828.00
1937-1938	no-details	..
1940	no-details	..
1941	702.00	..
1942	832.00	..
1943	no-details	..
1944	577.00	..
1945	no-details	..
1948	no-details	..
1950	no-details	..
1961-1971	no-details	..
1972	945.00	..
1973	1,110.00	..
1974	998.00	..
1975	794.00	..
1976	948.00	..
1977	673.40	..
1978	671.00	..
1979	1,090.00	..
1980	1,142.00	..
1981	1,344.00	..
1982	1,342.00	..
1983	918.00	..
1984	1,015.00	..
1985	990.50	..
1988	680.00	

Employment (1905–88)
Year(s)	Total	Overground	Underground
1905	12	8	4
1906-1913	..	..	..
1918	303	98	205
1919	364	145	219
1922	84	42	42
1923	269	107	162
1924	365	121	244
1925	400	129	271
1926	295	109	186
1927	271	110	161
1928	312	125	187
1929	344	143	201
1930	229	103	126
1931	35	26	9
1932	144	72	72
1933	235	106	129
1934	304	136	168
1935	315	140	175
1936	319	140	179
1937	329	147	182
1938	383	168	215
1940	379	174	205
1941	356	174	182
1942	375	176	199
1943	436	174	262
1944	406	178	228
1945	335	142	193
1948	293	135	158
1950	283	134	149
1976	315	..	..
1977	325	..	..
1978	338	..	..
1979	368	..	..
1980	376	..	..
1981	356	..	..
1982	341	..	..
1983	354	..	..
1984	364	..	..
1985	373	..	..
1988	120	..	..

== See also ==
- List of topics related to Cornwall
- Mining in Cornwall and Devon
- Dartmoor tin-mining
- South Crofty
- Wheal Jane

== Sources ==
- Buckley, J. A. (2002). The Cornish Mining Industry - A Brief History. Redruth, Cornwall: Tor Mark. ISBN 0-85025-397-7.
- Buckley, J. A.; Wills, D.; Riekstins K. T. (1996). Geevor Mine Underground. Camborne, Cornwall: Penhellick Publications. ISBN 1-871678-21-8.
- Stanier, Peter (1998). Mines of Cornwall and Devon - An Historic Photographic Record. Truro, Cornwall: Twelveheads Press. ISBN 0-906294-40-1.
- Geevor: Proceedings of the 9th Commonwealth Mining and Metallurgical Congress, May 1969.
