= Tring Reservoirs =

Reservoir in England

Coordinates: 51.813°N 0.668°W

- Site of Special Scientific Interest
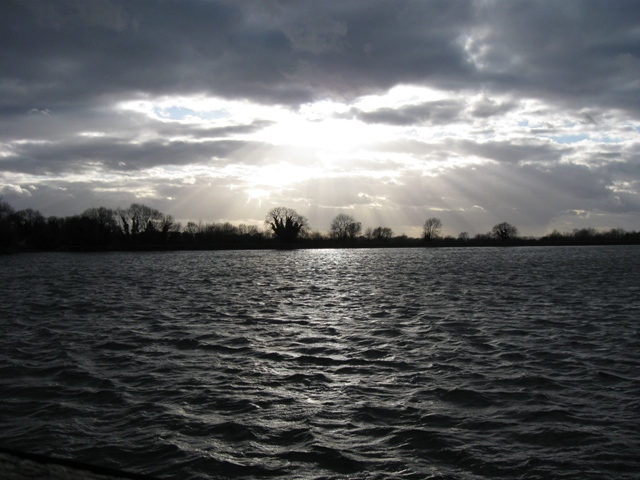
- Startops End Reservoir
- Location of Tring Reservoirs.
- Area of search: Hertfordshire; Buckinghamshire
- Grid reference: SP919136; SP905131
- Interest: Biological
- Area: 106.5 ha (263 acres)
- Notification date: 1987
- Location map: Magic Map

Tring Reservoirs is a group of four reservoirs close to Tring on the border of Hertfordshire and Buckinghamshire, England. Their purpose is to feed the Grand Union Canal.

The four reservoirs are: Startops End, Marsworth, Tringford and Wilstone. The first three reservoirs adjoin each other, separated only by paths and roads; the fourth, Wilstone Reservoir, is a short distance to the west, close to the village of Wilstone.

The reservoirs are a 106.5-hectare (263-acre) biological Site of Special Scientific Interest managed by the Herts and Middlesex Wildlife Trust.

== History ==
Wilstone Reservoir is the largest of the quartet at 119 acres (48 ha). Built in 1802, it is up to 18 feet (5.5 m) deep and has a capacity of 240 million imperial gallons (1.1 Gl). Wilstone reservoir supplies water to the Wendover arm of the Grand Union Canal. Startops End Reservoir, built in 1817, is much smaller at 26 acres (11 ha); Marsworth Reservoir, built in 1806, is 24 acres (9.7 ha); and the smallest, Tringford Reservoir, was built in 1816.

== Bats ==
Tring reservoirs are home to a large population because of the abundance of insects. Species include the Pipistrelle bat, which despite measuring just 4 cm in length and weighing approximately 5 grams, can consume around 3000 insects every night. Brandt's bats have been found at Wilstone Reservoir, also, the Noctule, one of Britain's larger bats. Other species include the Daubenton's bat which skims across the water's surface to prey on caddis flies. Bats are most likely to be seen after dusk on warm evenings in summer.

== Birds ==
Wilstone Reservoir is a very important wildfowl sanctuary, and many rare species dwell here, as well as on the other three reservoirs. These include Canada geese, great bittern, blackcap, black-headed gull, black-necked grebe, black-tailed godwit, black tern, blue tit, Cetti's warbler, common chiffchaff, corn bunting, common crane, common sandpiper, common scoter, common snipe, common teal, common tern, Eurasian coot, Eurasian curlew, curlew sandpiper, little grebe, dunlin, dunnock, Egyptian geese, Eurasian wigeon, gadwall, garden warbler, garganey, great crested grebe, great spotted woodpecker, green sandpiper, greenshank, green woodpecker, grey heron, greylag geese, hobby, jay, kingfisher, lapwing, lesser whitethroat, common linnet, little egret, little grebe, little ringed plover, mallard, mandarin, marsh harrier, marsh tit, Mediterranean gull, common moorhen, mute swan, northern pochard, northern wheatear, nuthatch, osprey, oystercatcher, peregrine falcon, pied flycatcher, pintail, red-crested pochard, red kite, red knot, redshank, Eurasian reed warbler, ruff, spotted flycatcher, sand martin, Savi's warbler, sedge warbler, common shelduck, shoveler, cormorant, spotted crake, stock dove, barn swallow, common swift, tawny owl, Eurasian treecreeper, tufted duck, water rail, whimbrel, whooper swan, willow warbler, yellow-legged gull, and yellow wagtail.

== Public footpaths and canal towpaths ==
There is an extensive network of public footpaths and canal towpaths.

== Angling ==
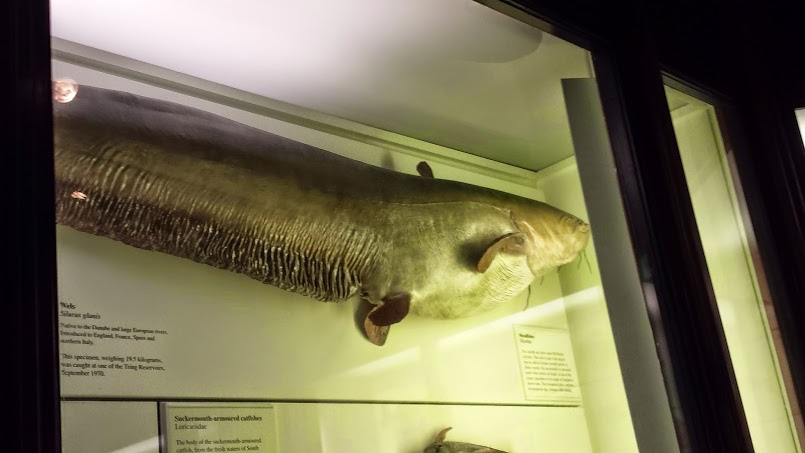
The former British Record Wels Catfish (Silurus glanis) of 43lb 8oz caught by Richard Bray at Wilstone Reservoir in 1970 and on display in the Natural History Museum, Tring, Hertfordshire.

The reservoirs are popular with anglers and most famous for holding British record sized specimen fish like wels catfish to 60 lb, with a former British record wels catfish of 43 lb 8oz caught by Richard Bray at Wilstone reservoir in 1970. carp to 35 lb, and tench to 14 lb, the British record tench has been achieved twice from Wilstone reservoir, first by Tony Chester in 1981 with a tench of 10 lb 1 oz 4 drams, then by Alan Wilson in 1985 with a tench of 12 lb 8 oz 11 drams. The fishery also holds pike to 20 lb, bream to 17 lb, the British record bream has been broken twice at Startops end reservoir with a bream of 12 lb 12 oz 8 drams caught by Mr. A.J Fisher from in 1931 and broken again by C.J.Pugh with a bream of 12 lb 14 oz in 1933. The current (to 2017) British record Perch was caught at Wilstone Reservoir by Ken Brown on 18 Sept 2012 weighing 6 lb 3oz. The reservoirs also hold roach and rudd to 2 lb, in addition, rainbow trout are also stocked in Tringford reservoir only for fly fishing.

== Gallery ==
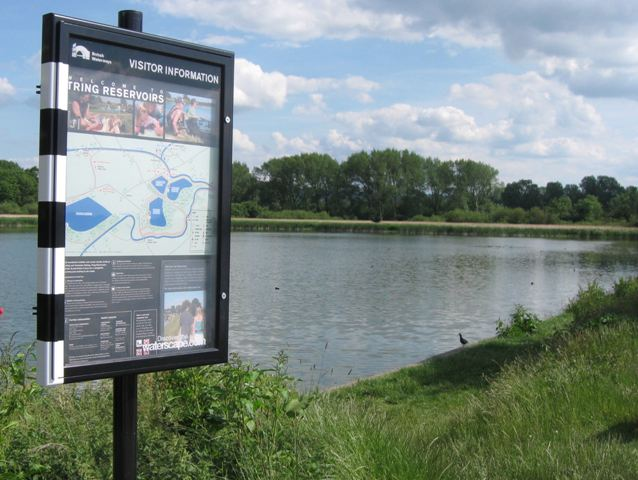
Marsworth Reservoir

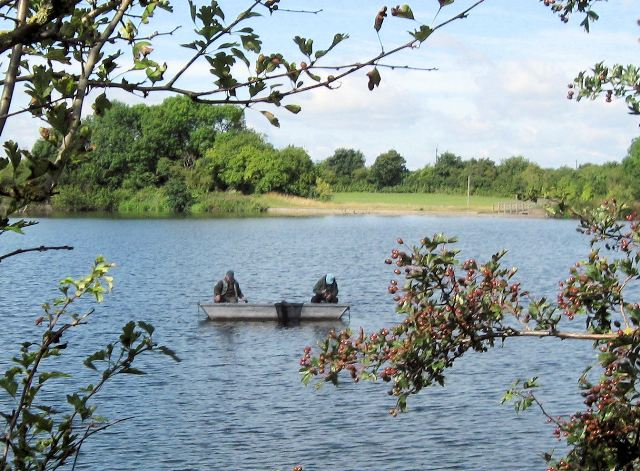
Tringford Reservoir

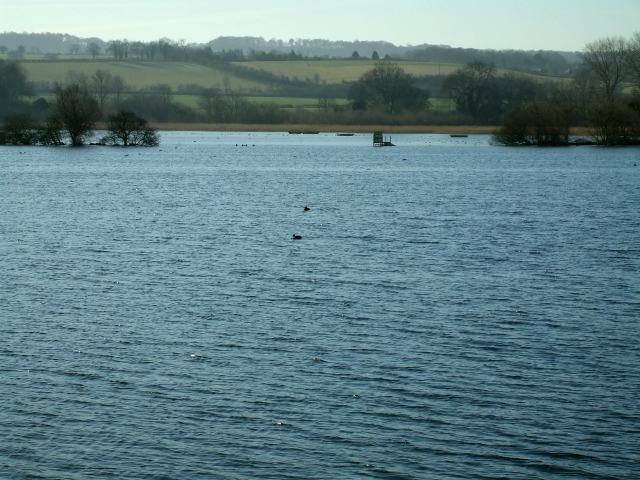
Wilstone Reservoir

== See also ==
- List of Sites of Special Scientific Interest in Buckinghamshire
- List of Sites of Special Scientific Interest in Hertfordshire
