= Winton, North Yorkshire =

Hamlet in North Yorkshire, England

Coordinates: 54.36403°N 1.36997°W

Winton
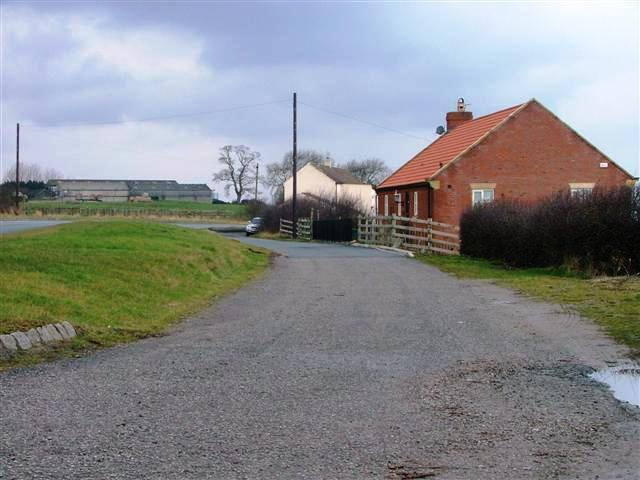
- Old Road towards Northallerton

- Location within North Yorkshire
- OS grid reference: SE410966
- Civil parish: Winton, Stank and Hallikeld
- Unitary authority: North Yorkshire
- Ceremonial county: North Yorkshire
- Region: Yorkshire and the Humber
- Country: England
- Sovereign state: United Kingdom
- Post town: Northallerton
- Postcode district: DL6
- Police: North Yorkshire
- Fire: North Yorkshire
- Ambulance: Yorkshire
- UK Parliament: Richmond and Northallerton

Winton is a hamlet in the county of North Yorkshire, England, in the civil parish of Winton, Stank and Hallikeld. From 1974 to 2023 it was part of the Hambleton District, it is now administered by the unitary North Yorkshire Council.

Winton House, a farmhouse, to the west of the hamlet is a Grade II listed building.

== See also ==
- Listed buildings in Winton, Stank and Hallikeld
