= Listed buildings in Winton, Stank and Hallikeld =

Winton, Stank and Hallikeld is a civil parish in the county of North Yorkshire, England. It contains two listed buildings that are recorded in the National Heritage List for England. Both the listed buildings are designated at Grade II, the lowest of the three grades, which is applied to "buildings of national importance and special interest". The parish contains the hamlet of Winton and the surrounding area, and both the listed buildings are farmhouses.

== Buildings ==
| Name and location | Photograph | Date | Notes |
|---|---|---|---|
| Stankhall; 54.35356°N 1.37807°W | | 1585 | The farmhouse is in stone on a deep plinth with chamfered coping, and has a Welsh slate roof. There are two storeys and three bays. The central doorway has chamfered jambs, impost bands, and a round arch with voussoirs. The windows are casements in chamfered surrounds. On the south gable end are two two-light mullioned windows, one blocked, and the other gable end has a blocked doorway with a worn date. |
| Winton House; 54.36345°N 1.37071°W | — | Late 18th century | The farmhouse is in red brick and stone, and has a Welsh slate roof with shaped kneelers and stone coping. There is a central block with two storeys and three bays, and flanking single-storey bays. The doorway has a Doric surround with pilasters, a frieze and a cornice, and a fanlight with ornamental glazing. The windows are sashes with flat brick arches. |
