= Winton, Stank and Hallikeld =

Civil parish in North Yorkshire, England

Coordinates: 54.364°N 1.370°W

- Civil parish
- Population: 280 (Including Ellerbeck and Kirby Sigston plus Sowerby-under-Cotcliffe and West Harlsey. 2011 census)
- OS grid reference: SE515780
- Civil parish: Winton, Stank and Hallikeld
- Unitary authority: North Yorkshire
- Ceremonial county: North Yorkshire
- Region: Yorkshire and the Humber
- Country: England
- Sovereign state: United Kingdom
- Post town: NORTHALLERTON
- Postcode district: DL6
- Police: North Yorkshire
- Fire: North Yorkshire
- Ambulance: Yorkshire

Winton, Stank and Hallikeld is a civil parish in the county of North Yorkshire, England. From 1974 to 2023 it was part of the Hambleton District, it is now administered by the unitary North Yorkshire Council.

== See also ==
- Listed buildings in Winton, Stank and Hallikeld
