= Westchester Interfaith/Interagency Network for Disaster and Emergency Recovery =

Westchester Interfaith/Interagency Network for Disaster and Emergency Recovery (WINDER) was founded in June 2007 in response to local flooding in Mamaroneck, New York, from the April 2007 nor'easter in order to coordinate long-term community and faith-based organizational assistance in response to local disasters as well as better prepare the community for future disasters. WINDER was a non-profit coalition of about a dozen local churches, community groups and charitable organizations. It focused on helping the elderly or the disabled victims who were awaiting FEMA assistance as well as those who needed physical assistance with basement cleanups. In June 2007, WINDER received a $20,000 grant from Episcopal Relief and Development, and along with private donations, enabled WINDER to aid the nearly four dozen cases it handled as well as to hire a part-time assistant that would answer its telephone hotline.

It was led by Board President and founder, Deborah G. Tammearu, the reverend of Saint Thomas Episcopal Church in Mamaroneck, as well as a member of the Episcopal Diocese of New York Disaster Response Team. Also on the board is Dave Currie of the United Way. Following the complete recovery from the flooding WINDER ceased to operate.
