= Winder (given name) =

Winder is a masculine given name. Notable people with the name include:

- Winder Cuevas (born 1988), Dominican Republic hurdler
- Winder R. Harris (1888–1973), American journalist, civil servant, and politician
- Winder Laird Henry (1864–1940), American politician
