= Wilstone =

Village in Hertfordshire, England

Coordinates: 51.8177°N 0.68885°W

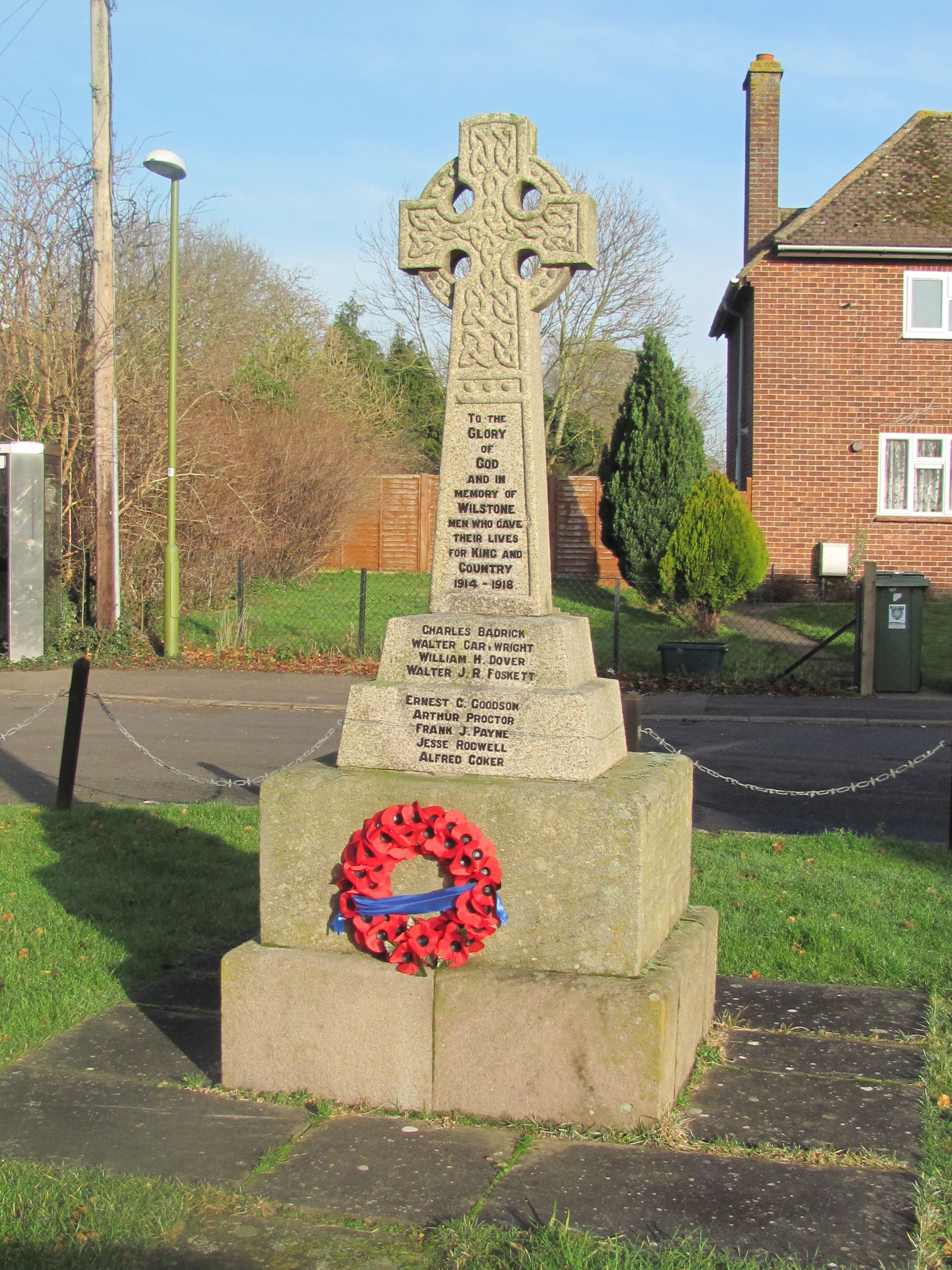
- Wilstone War memorial

- Location within Hertfordshire
- Population: 341
- OS grid reference: SP904140
- District: Dacorum
- Shire county: Hertfordshire
- Region: East
- Country: England
- Sovereign state: United Kingdom
- Post town: Tring
- Postcode district: HP23
- Police: Hertfordshire
- Fire: Hertfordshire
- Ambulance: East of England

Wilstone is an English village and a reservoir approximately two miles north-west of Tring, Hertfordshire. The village lies within the civil parish of Tring Rural, close to the boundary with Buckinghamshire.

Wilstone reservoir, one of the four Tring reservoirs, lies close to the village.

== History ==
In 1861 the village's population was recorded as around 455 however when a depression caused by international food trade and outbreaks of disease amongst workers hit the British agricultural industry the population declined. The village suffered heavily as workers' conditions worsened and wages lowered further. This degradation of conditions caused the village's population to drop to 400 as the workers moved to the city for a better life.

== Education ==
In 1838, the second year of Queen Victoria's reign, an act was passed to prompt the construction of more schools across England. Wilstone was selected as one of these locations and in 1848 the new school opened. The school was made up of one block and over its lifespan saw very few changes, the greatest change to the school being the transformation of the mud patch of a playground into a proper turfed area with an iron fence. The school saw 1,394 students cross its threshold with the students first entering the school when they were two years old and leaving when they were 12 years of age.

During World War I and World War II the school did its best to chip in and support the war efforts. In 1914-1918 the students collected 250 lbs of blackberries to add to the rations, In 1940 the school was pushed to maximum capacity as evacuees flooded the countryside from the cities under attack from the Luftwaffe and in 1948 the school was taken over by the Hertfordshire County Council from the Church of England and in 1956 school lunches were discontinued making the school into one of the very few in which students went home for lunch. In 1971 the school met its fate when it was shut down in favour of the modern school in Long Marston. The site remained empty until 1974 when it was turned into a block of flats.
