= Willington, Kent =

Suburb of Maidstone, Kent, England

Coordinates: 51°15′06″N 0°33′24″E

Willington is a suburb of Maidstone, in the Maidstone district, in the county of Kent, England.
