= Give Me Your Love (Barbara Mason album) =

Studio album by Barbara Mason
- Released: 1973
- Studio: Sigma Sound, Philadelphia, Pennsylvania
- Genre: Soul
- Label: Buddah

Barbara Mason chronology
If You Knew Him Like I Do (1970)	Give Me Your Love (1973)	Lady Love (1973)

Give Me Your Love is a 1973 album by Barbara Mason. Buddha Records' decision to record an album was due to the success of Mason's version of the Curtis Mayfield title song. The album included mature subject matter such as "Bed and Board", and "You Can Be With the One You Don't Love", expressing the desire for a lover outside of marriage. She was the first soul singer to record in the heavy breathing disco style later adopted by Donna Summer among others.
