= Wintershill =

Hamlet in Hampshire, England

Coordinates: 50°57′48″N 1°15′12″W

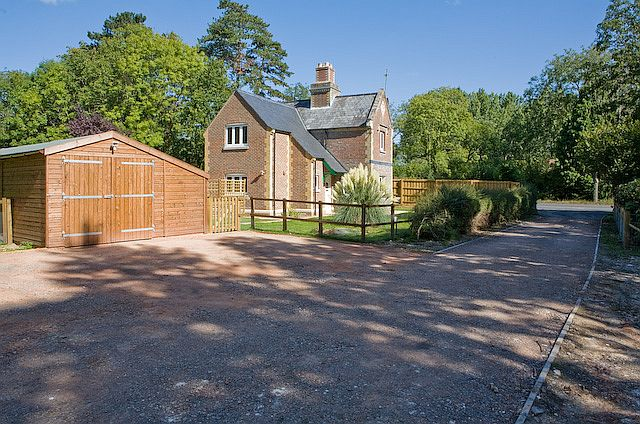
North Lodge, Wintershill

Wintershill is a hamlet in south Hampshire, England.
