= Wandilla (tugboat) =

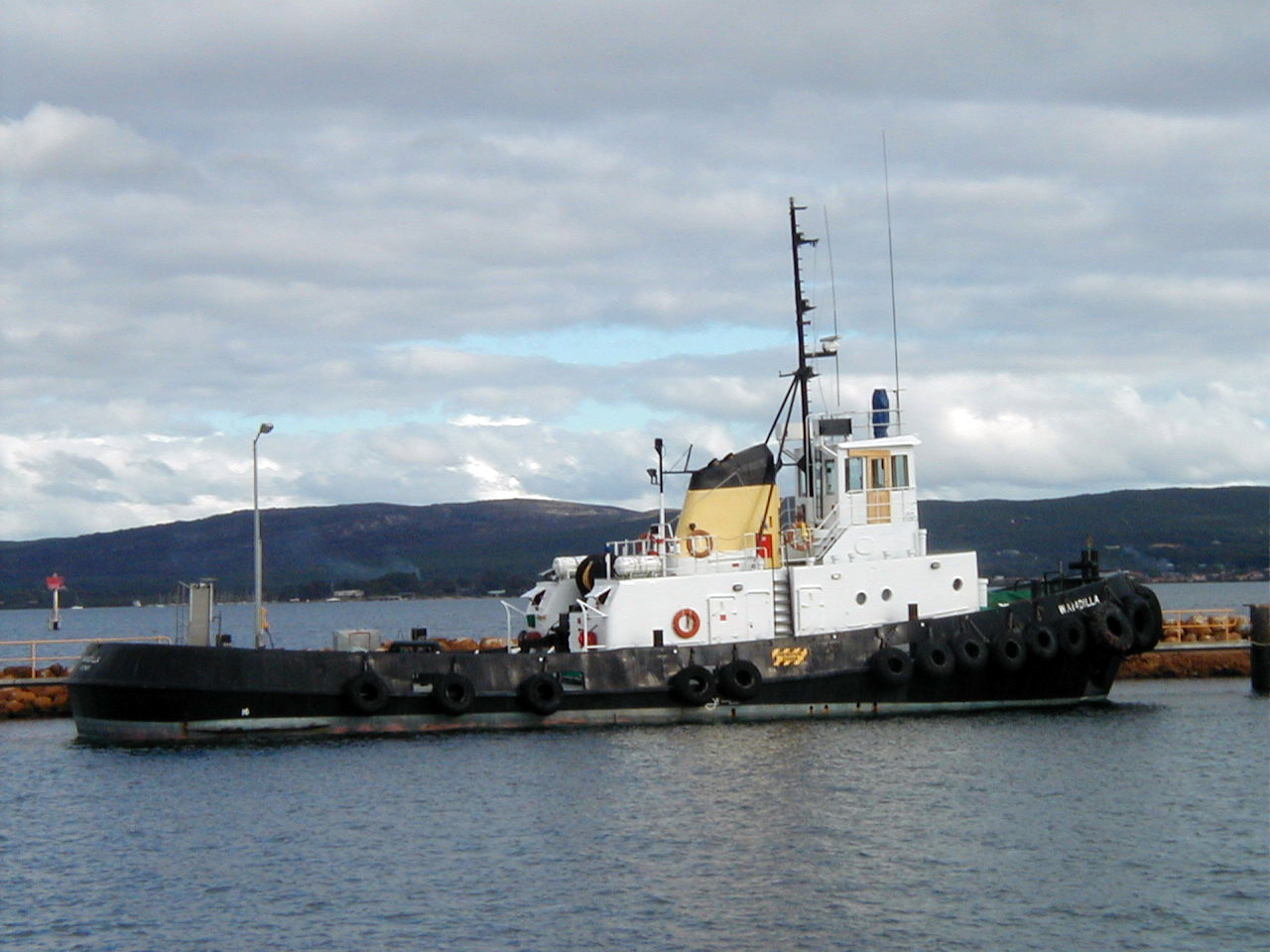
- Albany tugboat Wandilla

History
- Operator: Port of Albany

General characteristics
- Type: Tugboat

The Port of Albany is a Western Australian port located on the south coast of the state next to the city of Albany. The port has two tugs available for steerage, Elgin and Wandilla.
