= Wilminstone =

Coordinates: 50.568°N 4.125°W

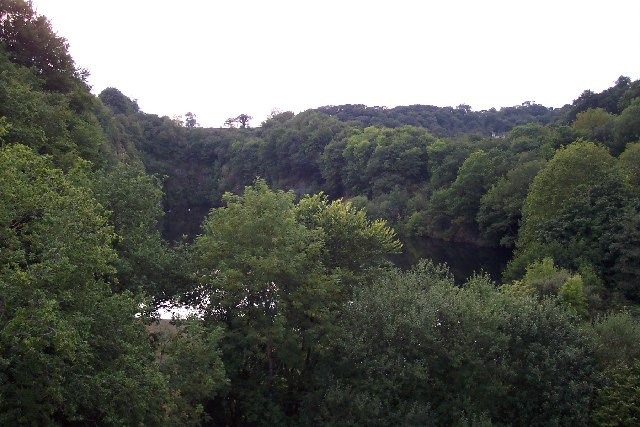
- Wilminstone Quarry

- Location within Devon
- Population: 82 (2001 Census)
- OS grid reference: SX491764
- District: West Devon
- Shire county: Devon
- Region: South West
- Country: England
- Sovereign state: United Kingdom
- Post town: TAVISTOCK
- Postcode district: PL19
- Dialling code: 01822
- Police: Devon and Cornwall
- Fire: Devon and Somerset
- Ambulance: South Western
- UK Parliament: Torridge and West Devon

Wilminstone is a village in the civil parish of Mary Tavy in the West Devon district of Devon, England. Its nearest town is Tavistock, which lies approximately 1.1 miles (1.8 km) south-west of the hamlet. Wilminstone is situated on the C157 a few hundred yards north of the A386; this is also part of National Cycle Route No.27. The River Wallabrooke flows alongside. Just to the north was Wilminstone Quarry, which once provided more than 1,200 tonnes of roadstone per week; it is now abandoned and flooded. Wilminstone stood on the Plymouth, Devonport and South Western Junction Railway line from Bere Alston to Lydford; the line and the station closed in 1968. The large railway viaduct (Bridge No.652) where the line crossed the Wallabrooke still exists today.
