= Winnall, Hampshire =

Suburb of Winchester, Hampshire, England

Coordinates: 51.065335°N 1.29707°W

Winnall
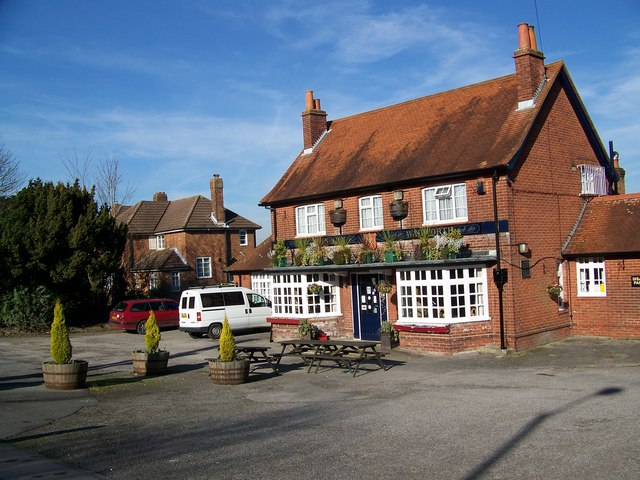
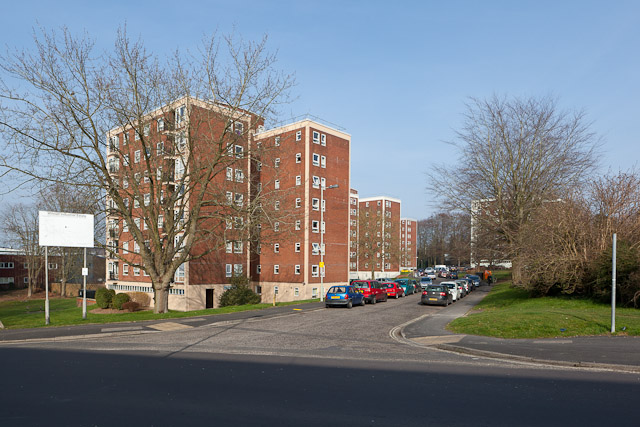
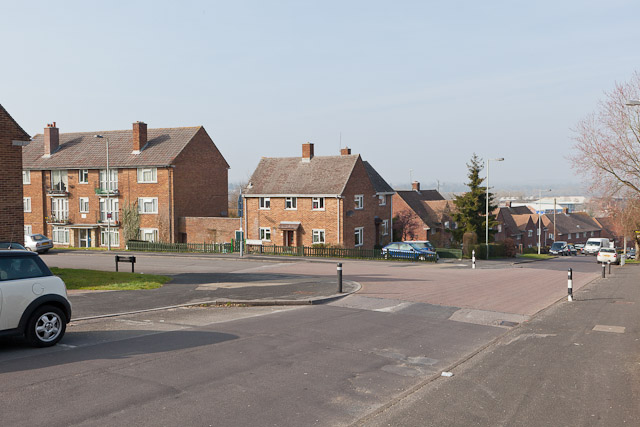
- (Clockwise from Top) The Golden Lion pub, houses on Winnall Manor Road, Flats off Winnall Manor Road

- Location within Hampshire
- OS grid reference: SU492298
- District: Winchester
- Shire county: Hampshire
- Region: South East
- Country: England
- Sovereign state: United Kingdom
- Post town: WINCHESTER
- Postcode district: SO23
- Dialling code: 01962
- Police: Hampshire and Isle of Wight
- Fire: Hampshire and Isle of Wight
- Ambulance: South Central
- UK Parliament: Winchester

Winnall is a northern suburb of Winchester, Hampshire, England, on the east bank of the River Itchen.

It is the location of the Winnall Moors nature reserve on the flood-plain of the Itchen and the University of Southampton's Erasmus Park hall of residence. Winnall is also the location of St Swithun's School, Winnal Primary school and Winchester's main industrial estate, occupying land between the A34 and the former Didcot, Newbury and Southampton Railway, by junction 9 of the M3.

== History ==
The name is presumed to derive from Wilighealh, a Saxon name probably relating to willows, mentioned in the Domesday Book as part of nearby Chilcomb. It appears in its modern spelling on a 1575 map by Saxton. Winnall was an ancient parish (incorporating that of St Giles by the late 13th century). In 1901 the civil parish had a population of 122. On 26 March 1902 the parish was abolished and merged with Winchester.

The area saw large amounts of housebuilding in the post-war period, with land purchased by the City Council in 1952 for 400-500 semi-detached homes on either side of Winnall Manor road, which is the main arterial road which the estate is built around. Further land was developed from 1961 for four eight-story high rise blocks, built by Wates and opened in 1963. A primary school also opened in 1960, initially with a capacity of 240 students, later peaking at 320, before settling to near 130 by the 2000s. There are a number of parks in Winnall, including on Winnall Manor Park, and on Imber Road.

It is now in the unparished area of Winchester, in the Winchester district. It is represented on Winchester City Council as part of St Bartholomew Ward, and on Hampshire County Council as part of Winchester Eastgate Division.
