= Windlehurst =

English hamlet

Coordinates: 53.373°N 2.075°W

Windlehurst is a hamlet situated south of Marple in the Metropolitan Borough of Stockport, Greater Manchester, England. The hamlet had its own primary school until it was closed in the 1990s due to a shortage of pupils.
