= Winnall Moors =

British nature reserve

Coordinates: 51.07255°N 1.30300°W

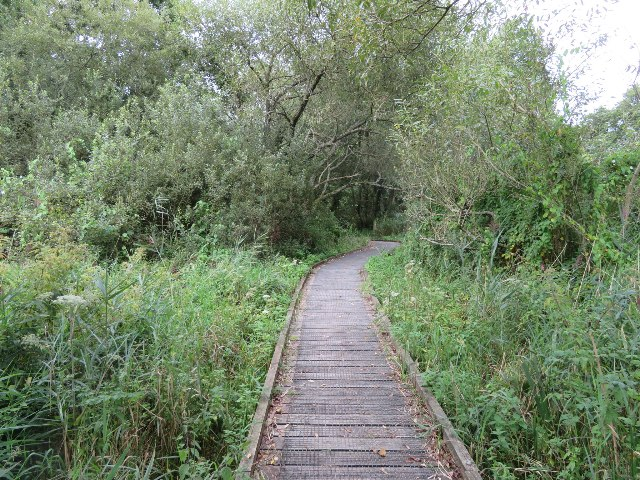
- Interactive map of Winnall Moors
- Type: Nature reserve
- Location: Winchester, Hampshire
- OS grid: SU 490 306
- Area: 64 hectares (160 acres)
- Manager: Hampshire and Isle of Wight Wildlife Trust

Winnall Moors is a 64-hectare (160-acre) nature reserve in Winchester in Hampshire. It is managed by the Hampshire and Isle of Wight Wildlife Trust.

The southern section is owned by Winchester City Council and has been managed by HIWWT since the 1980s. The northern part was formerly farmed as low-intensity grazing, but was purchased by HIWWT following a public appeal, with assistance from the Heritage Lottery Fund.

The site lies within the western end of the South Downs National Park.

== Flora and fauna ==
Habitats on the site include chalk stream, tall fen, hay meadow and wet pasture. Plant life includes green-flowered helleborine, water crowfoot, lesser water-parsnip, purple loosestrife (Lythrum salicaria), yellow flag (Iris pseudacorus), various sedges, common reed, reed canary grass, fleabane, meadowsweet (Filipendula ulmaria), fen bedstraw, southern marsh-orchid, yellow rattle and eyebright.

Birds include little grebe, mute swan and mallard, reed and sedge warblers, gadwall, wigeon and snipe.

There are many different species of breeding dragonfly and damselfly including the broad-bodied chaser, common darter and banded demoiselle.
