= Searson Wigginton =

English cricketer

Personal information
- Full name: Searson Harry Wigginton
- Born: 26 March 1909; Leicester, Leicestershire, England
- Died: 15 September 1977 (aged 68); Bulawayo, Zimbabwe
- Nickname: Sis
- Batting: Right-handed
- Bowling: Right-arm medium-pace
- Role: Batsman

Domestic team information
- Years: Team
- 1930–34: Leicestershire
- First-class debut: 16 July 1930 Leicestershire v Worcestershire
- Last First-class: 28 August 1934 Leicestershire v Worcestershire

Career statistics
| Competition | First-class |
|---|---|
| Matches | 49 |
| Runs scored | 1426 |
| Batting average | 17.60 |
| 100s/50s | 1/5 |
| Top score | 120* |
| Balls bowled | 174 |
| Wickets | 3 |
| Bowling average | 30.00 |
| 5 wickets in innings | – |
| 10 wickets in match | – |
| Best bowling | 2/14 |
| Catches/stumpings | 19/– |
- Source: CricketArchive, 30 August 2013

Searson Harry Wigginton (26 March 1909 – 15 September 1977) was an English cricketer who played first-class cricket for Leicestershire from 1930 to 1934. He was born in Leicester and died in Bulawayo, Zimbabwe.

== Cricket career ==
Wigginton was a right-handed batsman sometimes used as an opener and an occasional right-arm medium-pace bowler. After schooling at Wyggeston School he played for Leicestershire's second eleven in the Minor Counties Championship from 1929 and the following year made his first-class debut in a single match against Worcestershire which was lost by an innings; he scored 1 and 6 and was then not picked for first-team cricket for two years.

He reappeared in first-class cricket for Leicestershire in 1932 and played in most of the matches in the second half of the season, usually batting in the middle order but also occasionally opening the batting. His highest score in the season was an innings of 82 in the game against Warwickshire at Hinckley. In the season as a whole, he made 551 runs at an average of 21.19.

Wigginton was badly out of form in 1933 when he averaged only 8.36 runs per innings from 19 completed innings; had he not made a score of 69 in the game against Nottinghamshire, his average would have been only 5.00. But he returned to the team as a regular player in 1934 when, with 709 runs in 22 matches, he achieved his highest aggregate. In the game against Worcestershire at Leicester, he scored an unbeaten 120 in a Leicestershire total of 493, and this proved to be the only century of his first-class career. Wisden Cricketers' Almanack for 1935 wrote that he "revealed himself as a batsman of distinct promise". The promise was not fulfilled, however; Wigginton disappeared from English first-class cricket at the end of the 1934 season and did not play again.

== After cricket ==
He coached at Taunton School and then moved to Rhodesia to become coach for the Rhodesian Cricket Association. A school reminiscences website from Zimbabwe records that Wigginton was "caretaker and groundsman" at the Gifford High School, Bulawayo, between 1953 and 1969, with his wife acting as "cook-matron". He also helped with cricket coaching: a star cricket pupil in this period was Brian Davison, who captained Leicestershire in the 1970s.
