= Winder (band) =

Band

- Origin: Denmark/Germany
- Genres: Synthpop
- Years active: 1984–1985
- Labels: Supreme Records, Virgin, Popeye
- Past members: Charlotte Jager; Paul Leslie

Winder was a synthpop duo of Charlotte Jäger from Odense in Denmark and Heinz-Wilfried Burow from Hamburg, Germany. They released one album, International Love, in 1985, and three singles, "Run for Love", "Do It Right" and "International Love". "Run for Love" reached number 10 in the Danish charts. The following singles failed to chart. The band disbanded and disappeared into obscurity.

== Discography ==
=== Albums ===
- International Love (1985)

=== Singles ===
- "Run for Love" / "Give Me Your Love" (7" / 12" single) (1984)
- "Do It Right" / "I Close My Eyes" (7" / 12" single) (1985)
- "International Love" (1986)
