= List of homesteads in Western Australia: W =

This list includes all homesteads in Western Australia with a gazetted name. It is complete with respect to the 1996 Gazetteer of Australia. Dubious names have been checked against the online 2004 data, and in all cases confirmed correct. However, if any homesteads have been gazetted or deleted since 1996, this list does not reflect these changes. Strictly speaking, Australian place names are gazetted in capital letters only; the names in this list have been converted to mixed case in accordance with normal capitalisation conventions.

Name	Location	Remarks
Wabdallah	34°42′S 117°23′E	
Wadalin Creek	33°9′S 116°47′E	
Wadda Wadda	30°35′S 115°35′E	
Waddi Park	29°55′S 116°17′E	
Waddy Waddy	29°53′S 116°15′E	
Wagga Wagga	28°20′S 116°56′E	
Wagoe Farm	27°53′S 114°9′E	
Wagon Wheels	33°15′S 115°49′E	
Wahgunya	34°7′S 119°5′E	
Wahronga	31°31′S 116°7′E	
Wahroonga	25°29′S 114°24′E	
Wahroonga	31°5′S 115°51′E	
Wahroonga	33°20′S 115°53′E	
Wahroonga	34°16′S 118°47′E	
Wahroonga	33°25′S 117°18′E	
Wahroonga	29°44′S 116°13′E	
Wahroonga	34°16′S 115°9′E	
Waichalup	34°30′S 117°20′E	
Waidup Farm	31°27′S 115°53′E	
Wail Outcamp	27°5′S 115°30′E	
Waitemata	32°47′S 116°39′E	
Wakedale	31°15′S 115°45′E	
Wakefield	33°31′S 115°34′E	
Walbing Field	33°41′S 115°48′E	
Waldburg	24°45′S 117°21′E	
Walene	33°33′S 115°39′E	
Walford	33°15′S 115°46′E	
Walford	34°59′S 118°3′E	
Walgali Aboriginal Outstation	21°8′S 127°36′E	
Walgan	30°39′S 115°58′E	
Walgun	23°12′S 120°43′E	
Walgy	32°2′S 116°55′E	
Walkalina	31°16′S 115°55′E	
Walkerie	32°4′S 116°58′E	
Wallacup	33°39′S 118°2′E	
Wallal Downs	19°47′S 120°38′E	
Wallal South	33°7′S 116°57′E	
Wallareenya	20°45′S 118°49′E	
Wallaspring	33°56′S 116°24′E	
Wallcliffe House	33°58′S 115°0′E	
Wallinar	33°53′S 117°36′E	
Walling Rock	29°21′S 120°24′E	
Walma	33°0′S 119°34′E	
Walsall	33°47′S 115°22′E	
Walwalling	32°30′S 116°57′E	
Walyer Walyer	30°51′S 115°37′E	
Walyoo	30°54′S 115°41′E	
Walyuring	32°58′S 118°1′E	
Wamballup	34°31′S 117°27′E	
Wambesi	33°47′S 121°44′E	
Wamerah Park	33°27′S 116°50′E	
Wanaka	33°49′S 120°12′E	
Wanaka	33°53′S 117°25′E	
Wanarie	27°50′S 117°53′E	
Wanarra	29°31′S 116°48′E	
Wanbi	34°28′S 118°42′E	
Wancoona	34°3′S 117°1′E	
Wandagee	23°46′S 114°33′E	
Wandana	34°32′S 118°17′E	
Wandaroo	33°37′S 117°14′E	
Wandarri	34°49′S 117°41′E	
Wandary Outcamp	25°11′S 117°8′E	
Wande Arah	33°43′S 121°21′E	
Wandella	33°38′S 117°23′E	
Wandena	30°41′S 116°8′E	
Wandena	31°36′S 116°1′E	
Wanderin	33°42′S 121°33′E	
Wandgee	34°44′S 118°25′E	
Wandibirrup	33°31′S 117°6′E	
Wandilla	30°41′S 115°41′E	
Wandillah	32°16′S 116°52′E	
Wandina	27°59′S 115°38′E	
Wandlea	33°14′S 115°51′E	
Wandoa	29°58′S 116°11′E	
Wandoo	33°5′S 117°2′E	
Wanerie Farm	31°11′S 115°33′E	
Wangalee Downs	33°45′S 121°27′E	
Wanganut Spring Outcamp	17°25′S 122°20′E	
Wangoolia Outcamp	27°3′S 115°55′E	
Wangumma	32°47′S 118°29′E	
Wanmulla	27°15′S 118°20′E	
Wanna	23°55′S 116°34′E	
Wanneary	30°36′S 116°38′E	
Wanneranooka	29°28′S 115°46′E	
Wannering	32°5′S 116°58′E	
Wanto	33°32′S 115°45′E	
Wanwindup	34°2′S 117°5′E	
Wapenamanda	33°23′S 121°53′E	
Warambie	20°57′S 117°22′E	
Waranine	32°25′S 116°46′E	
Waratah	32°39′S 115°50′E	
Waratah	33°58′S 116°4′E	
Waratah	32°32′S 116°54′E	
Warding Farm	31°45′S 116°57′E	
Wardren	33°30′S 117°14′E	
Wareek	33°46′S 117°19′E	
Warialda	33°44′S 116°36′E	
Waricul	33°29′S 119°58′E	
Warkalup East	33°29′S 119°47′E	
Warley Park	33°39′S 116°43′E	
Warmer Glen	29°0′S 115°13′E	
Warnaminup	33°31′S 117°58′E	
Warnawarra	29°57′S 115°40′E	
Warongerup	34°7′S 117°5′E	
Warra Jarra	34°24′S 118°53′E	
Warra Warra	30°34′S 115°35′E	
Warra Woona	32°1′S 117°53′E	
Warra-warra	33°2′S 115°54′E	
Warradale Park	33°27′S 116°39′E	
Warradong Springs	29°19′S 115°12′E	
Warraga	34°54′S 117°52′E	
Warrah	29°49′S 116°29′E	
Warralea	33°49′S 115°6′E	
Warralee	33°53′S 117°30′E	
Warralong	20°56′S 119°19′E	
Warralong	20°39′S 119°35′E	
Warramboo	31°11′S 115°47′E	
Warramboo	21°39′S 115°49′E	
Warramuggan	30°59′S 117°24′E	
Warrangee	34°52′S 118°14′E	
Warraniani	33°56′S 116°16′E	
Warranine	31°44′S 116°33′E	
Warrawagine	20°51′S 120°42′E	
Warrawee	34°34′S 116°58′E	
Warrawing	34°40′S 118°2′E	
Warrawong	33°56′S 116°37′E	
Warrawoona	33°40′S 122°5′E	
Warrawoona	32°42′S 118°0′E	
Warren Point	30°34′S 116°6′E	
Warrenella	33°5′S 117°40′E	
Warrenella	34°12′S 115°6′E	
Warrengabbie	30°44′S 116°1′E	
Warrens	33°3′S 116°51′E	
Warrie	22°16′S 119°42′E	
Warrie Outcamp	22°24′S 119°32′E	
Warriearran Outcamp	20°0′S 119°16′E	
Warriedar	29°8′S 117°11′E	
Warrigal	34°30′S 118°31′E	
Warrimbah Outstation	18°26′S 125°4′E	
Warrine	28°39′S 114°51′E	
Warriup	34°43′S 118°28′E	
Warriup	33°34′S 122°52′E	
Warroora	23°29′S 113°47′E	
Warup	33°3′S 115°54′E	
Warwick Glen	33°53′S 115°5′E	
Warwick Park	30°35′S 116°8′E	
Watchungu	33°34′S 115°58′E	
Water Vale	33°56′S 115°15′E	
Waterbank	17°48′S 122°14′E	
Waterdale	32°23′S 116°53′E	
Waterdale	33°46′S 117°2′E	
Waterfalls	33°53′S 116°6′E	
Waterfarm	33°41′S 115°6′E	
Waterhatch	32°7′S 116°50′E	
Waterhatch	33°48′S 115°15′E	
Waterkerry	31°48′S 116°45′E	
Waterloo Ford	33°19′S 115°47′E	
Waterville	31°16′S 115°35′E	
Watsonia	29°13′S 115°16′E	
Wattle Bank	33°37′S 121°33′E	
Wattle Brook	33°39′S 115°34′E	
Wattle Creek	27°59′S 117°45′E	
Wattle Dene	33°58′S 116°29′E	
Wattle Downs	29°7′S 114°58′E	
Wattle Grove	27°55′S 114°37′E	
Wattle Grove	33°5′S 118°17′E	
Wattle Grove	31°15′S 115°47′E	
Wattle Hill	31°51′S 118°2′E	
Wattle Hill	34°41′S 117°55′E	
Wattle Park	33°47′S 117°27′E	
Wattle Ridge	29°2′S 114°50′E	
Wattledale	33°6′S 118°54′E	
Wattledale	33°45′S 116°42′E	
Wattledale	33°35′S 117°20′E	
Wattlelands	34°46′S 117°48′E	
Waverley Park	32°13′S 117°2′E	
Waverly	34°22′S 118°48′E	
Wawbrook	32°30′S 117°44′E	
Waykup	33°29′S 121°30′E	
Wayne Fleet	33°44′S 117°21′E	
Wayup Downs	33°50′S 115°13′E	
Wayville	33°32′S 117°39′E	
Webbery	30°57′S 116°28′E	
Weddeboon	34°16′S 118°38′E	
Wedgengully	32°28′S 117°57′E	
Weebo	28°0′S 121°5′E	
Weedarrah	25°1′S 115°51′E	
Weelarrana	23°59′S 120°1′E	
Weinteriga	34°5′S 117°5′E	
Weiro Downs	28°59′S 114°51′E	
Weirs Farm	29°29′S 115°56′E	
Weizere	29°1′S 114°49′E	
Welcome Hill	32°2′S 118°41′E	
Weldsgift	33°44′S 115°51′E	
Wellbanks	33°57′S 117°52′E	
Welldon	33°1′S 116°45′E	
Wellesbourne	33°49′S 117°44′E	
Wellington Farms	34°8′S 115°13′E	
Wellwood	33°39′S 117°55′E	
Wembley	33°25′S 117°43′E	
Wendouree	27°54′S 114°43′E	
Wendouree	33°53′S 116°54′E	
Wengarry	31°38′S 116°6′E	
Wenlock	32°32′S 115°58′E	
Wensley Dale	33°48′S 117°35′E	
Weonavale	33°28′S 118°16′E	
Werillup	34°58′S 117°41′E	
Werinda Downs	33°49′S 117°49′E	
Wernup	33°39′S 117°49′E	
Werribee	31°19′S 115°52′E	
West Bay Stud	34°17′S 115°9′E	
West Lort River	33°39′S 121°12′E	
West Plains	33°35′S 119°42′E	
West Point	33°38′S 120°33′E	
West Sandgate	32°2′S 116°43′E	
West Texas	34°51′S 117°57′E	
West View	33°37′S 117°50′E	
Westbank	33°38′S 117°46′E	
Westbourne	34°42′S 117°32′E	
Westbourne	33°20′S 117°10′E	
Westbourne	32°0′S 116°51′E	
Westbrook	33°42′S 115°14′E	
Westburn	32°7′S 116°55′E	
Westbury	33°35′S 117°23′E	
Westcourt	33°51′S 117°8′E	
Westcup	34°24′S 117°20′E	
Westendale	33°28′S 117°6′E	
Western Hills	33°59′S 117°1′E	
Western Nodes	30°50′S 115°41′E	
Western Park	33°35′S 116°56′E	
Westfield	34°46′S 117°23′E	
Westham	33°16′S 115°47′E	
Westholme	34°14′S 117°39′E	
Westland	32°7′S 116°54′E	
Westland Acres	34°41′S 116°9′E	
Westlands	33°59′S 117°39′E	
Westlands	32°52′S 117°6′E	
Westminster Park	30°59′S 116°11′E	
Westover	32°55′S 116°30′E	
Westpool	34°39′S 116°3′E	
Westvale	31°10′S 116°11′E	
Westview	29°30′S 115°15′E	
Westview East	29°30′S 115°17′E	
Westwood	32°39′S 116°40′E	
Westwood	33°33′S 117°19′E	
Westwood Farm	33°32′S 117°47′E	
Whakea	31°19′S 115°56′E	
Wharton	33°55′S 122°35′E	
Whataning	33°31′S 117°33′E	
Wheatfield	33°24′S 117°9′E	
Wheatfield	33°54′S 116°40′E	
Whelarra	33°26′S 118°30′E	
Whispering Pines	34°1′S 115°5′E	
Whispering Pines	33°43′S 115°27′E	
Whistlers Gully	33°15′S 115°47′E	
White Bridge	33°43′S 115°49′E	
White Cliffs	28°26′S 122°57′E	
White Gulley	31°16′S 116°22′E	
White Rocks	33°13′S 115°51′E	
White Springs	31°8′S 116°24′E	
White Springs	21°47′S 118°49′E	
White Wells	29°35′S 116°58′E	
Whitecroft	33°9′S 117°36′E	
Whiteworth	33°56′S 117°54′E	
Whitfield	33°10′S 116°33′E	
Whyalla	34°44′S 117°57′E	
Whyandra	33°5′S 117°55′E	
Whyrstley	33°51′S 116°32′E	
Wicherina Downs	28°45′S 115°1′E	
Wicka	28°33′S 114°57′E	
Wickham	34°20′S 116°16′E	
Wicklow	34°35′S 117°44′E	
Wicklow Farm	31°58′S 116°57′E	
Wicktonlea	33°48′S 117°26′E	
Widmere	33°36′S 115°55′E	
Wigboro	33°49′S 118°29′E	
Wilangi	34°35′S 118°27′E	
Wilaust	33°30′S 121°8′E	
Wilberforce	31°46′S 116°43′E	
Wilbrook	33°13′S 119°4′E	
Wilcarra	32°25′S 117°32′E	
Wildara Outcamp	28°13′S 120°51′E	
Wildcroft	33°38′S 115°4′E	
Wildwood Valley	33°41′S 115°3′E	
Wileri	27°59′S 114°19′E	
Wilgemar	33°43′S 117°25′E	
Wililoo	33°37′S 117°28′E	
Wilkinson Farm	29°50′S 115°19′E	
Willafarm	29°59′S 115°38′E	
Willagree Park	17°54′S 122°15′E	
Willandra Downs	34°13′S 119°9′E	
Willawayup	33°31′S 121°36′E	
Willendaise Park	33°33′S 115°45′E	
Williambury	23°52′S 115°9′E	
Willigobung	33°32′S 117°0′E	
Willinga	34°33′S 117°37′E	
Willingvale	33°36′S 117°24′E	
Willow Brook Farm	31°19′S 115°42′E	
Willow Green	29°16′S 115°14′E	
Willow Park	33°36′S 115°29′E	
Willowup	35°3′S 117°36′E	
Wills More Outcamp	28°52′S 120°19′E	
Wilpuna Park	34°34′S 117°21′E	
Wimmera Downs	33°45′S 118°0′E	
Winbin	33°5′S 117°21′E	
Windaree	33°28′S 121°54′E	
Windee	34°7′S 118°57′E	
Windemere	31°28′S 116°47′E	
Winderie	25°18′S 115°7′E	
Windermere	33°44′S 117°6′E	
Windermere	33°6′S 116°54′E	
Windidda	26°23′S 122°13′E	
Windilya	32°45′S 116°59′E	
Windimurra	28°19′S 118°33′E	
Windjingayr Aboriginal Outstation	17°15′S 124°44′E	
Windmesh	33°39′S 119°36′E	
Windormungi	33°31′S 121°59′E	
Windrush	34°46′S 118°8′E	
Windrush Farm	34°46′S 118°7′E	
Windside	33°7′S 117°36′E	
Windside	34°48′S 117°47′E	
Windsor	28°0′S 118°34′E	
Windstorm	32°35′S 117°43′E	
Windy Downs	34°8′S 115°14′E	
Windy Hill	33°42′S 119°37′E	
Windy Hill	33°37′S 118°43′E	
Windy Ridge	33°39′S 117°1′E	
Windy Ridge	33°47′S 115°59′E	
Windy Ridge	31°56′S 118°15′E	
Windy Spring	29°52′S 116°4′E	
Winfield	33°52′S 117°19′E	
Wingallup	33°46′S 116°20′E	
Wingaree	33°22′S 121°41′E	
Wingarra	28°44′S 114°56′E	
Winjeel	33°49′S 118°10′E	
Winning	23°9′S 114°32′E	
Winona	34°4′S 116°8′E	
Winton Park	34°1′S 117°27′E	
Wiregaminda Outcamp	28°31′S 116°34′E	
Wirilya	31°38′S 116°22′E	
Wirra	33°26′S 121°7′E	
Wirra	34°7′S 118°25′E	
Wirra Birra	33°33′S 115°55′E	
Wirralea	29°38′S 115°20′E	
Wirralee	34°17′S 115°8′E	
Wirrilda	30°49′S 116°9′E	
Wisteria	31°38′S 116°49′E	
Witherswood	33°11′S 116°50′E	
Wits End	33°29′S 122°53′E	
Wittenoom Downs	33°28′S 122°7′E	
Wittenoom Hill	33°34′S 122°17′E	
Wittmore	33°23′S 115°47′E	
Woagin	33°26′S 117°3′E	
Wogarno	28°23′S 117°41′E	
Wogerlin	32°11′S 117°50′E	
Woglin	32°41′S 116°42′E	
Wolaroi	34°56′S 117°37′E	
Wolyaming	33°32′S 117°54′E	
Womarden	29°31′S 115°46′E	
Wondinong	27°52′S 118°25′E	
Wong Wong	30°22′S 116°11′E	
Wongabeelia	33°37′S 115°52′E	
Wongabeena	34°13′S 119°1′E	
Wongaburra	29°43′S 115°20′E	
Wongaburra	33°57′S 115°4′E	
Wongalea	33°39′S 118°1′E	
Wongalillup	34°22′S 117°35′E	
Wonganoo	27°8′S 121°20′E	
Wongarbon	32°21′S 116°52′E	
Wongaup	34°0′S 118°36′E	
Wongawol	26°7′S 121°56′E	
Wongutha	33°40′S 121°52′E	
Wongyarra	29°37′S 116°3′E	
Wonnenup	34°13′S 117°6′E	
Woodbine	32°21′S 116°57′E	
Woodbine	28°41′S 114°47′E	
Woodbridge	34°33′S 117°9′E	
Woodbrook	20°55′S 117°7′E	
Woodburn	33°51′S 117°2′E	
Woodcote	28°44′S 115°3′E	
Woodford	33°24′S 116°19′E	
Woodlands	33°45′S 117°23′E	
Woodlands	31°26′S 116°34′E	
Woodlands	32°39′S 116°58′E	
Woodlands	32°45′S 117°53′E	
Woodlands	32°59′S 117°59′E	
Woodlands	24°49′S 118°7′E	
Woodlands	31°13′S 115°34′E	
Woodlands	30°18′S 116°6′E	
Woodlands	34°32′S 118°2′E	
Woodlands	33°59′S 117°29′E	
Woodlands	33°36′S 116°15′E	
Woodlands Farm	34°42′S 117°50′E	
Woodlat	33°45′S 117°23′E	
Woodleigh	26°3′S 114°45′E	
Woodley	31°34′S 116°59′E	
Woodlyn	29°28′S 116°8′E	
Woodperry	33°38′S 115°56′E	
Woodside	35°1′S 117°36′E	
Woodside	31°47′S 116°41′E	
Woodside	29°11′S 114°56′E	
Woodside House	33°43′S 115°3′E	
Woodsome Estate	31°43′S 116°2′E	
Woodspoint	33°42′S 117°26′E	
Woodstock	21°37′S 118°57′E	
Woodstock	33°46′S 120°15′E	
Woodstock	33°7′S 119°10′E	
Woodstock	33°51′S 116°24′E	
Woodville	33°58′S 117°3′E	
Woodville	33°44′S 115°50′E	
Woodyarrup	33°54′S 117°48′E	
Woogalong	27°49′S 116°34′E	
Woogenilup	34°32′S 117°49′E	
Wookoora	27°59′S 114°36′E	
Woolakabin	33°1′S 116°59′E	
Woolama	30°42′S 116°11′E	
Woolareen	33°57′S 117°9′E	
Woolberoo	29°55′S 116°7′E	
Wooleen	27°5′S 116°9′E	
Woolgarre	33°26′S 117°14′E	
Woolgning	32°42′S 117°59′E	
Woolgorong	27°45′S 115°50′E	
Woolgorong Outcamp	27°32′S 115°39′E	
Woolibar	31°4′S 121°40′E	
Woolkabin	33°25′S 117°35′E	
Wooramel	25°44′S 114°17′E	
Wooregong	31°47′S 116°46′E	
Woorlba	32°24′S 124°0′E	
Wooroonga	33°10′S 119°1′E	
Worlup Park	33°53′S 115°59′E	
Wotto	29°41′S 115°24′E	
Wrens Place	32°30′S 117°41′E	
Wurrion	29°22′S 115°22′E	
Wyadup Valley	33°41′S 115°0′E	
Wyaledgin	33°27′S 117°12′E	
Wyalgima	32°0′S 116°56′E	
Wyalong	28°40′S 115°19′E	
Wyarin	33°37′S 117°59′E	
Wydgee	31°33′S 115°37′E	
Wydgee	28°51′S 117°50′E	
Wye Farm	29°11′S 114°59′E	
Wye Wye	30°51′S 116°31′E	
Wyecombe	34°50′S 117°58′E	
Wyena	33°44′S 120°22′E	
Wyland Heights	33°38′S 122°35′E	
Wyloo	22°41′S 116°14′E	
Wymburup	34°7′S 118°24′E	
Wyncrest Farms	34°32′S 117°31′E	
Wyndee	33°29′S 121°37′E	
Wyndermere	34°0′S 117°22′E	
Wyndi Wyndi	34°54′S 117°50′E	
Wynley	33°31′S 115°38′E	
Wynmara	29°52′S 116°9′E	
Wynmara Stud	29°50′S 116°14′E	
Wynnarling	32°32′S 117°12′E	
Wynona Downs	33°35′S 121°41′E	
Wynyangoo	27°56′S 118°11′E	
Wyoming	32°5′S 118°11′E	
Wyoming	32°41′S 117°31′E	
Wyoming	34°31′S 117°50′E	
Wyong	33°31′S 121°51′E	
Wyuna	33°28′S 116°56′E	
Wyworrie	29°41′S 116°17′E	
Wywurrie	32°46′S 117°14′E	
Wywurry	29°49′S 116°33′E	

== See also ==
- List of pastoral leases in Western Australia
