= Quarley Hill Fort =

Coordinates: 51.180°N 1.627°W

- Site of Special Scientific Interest
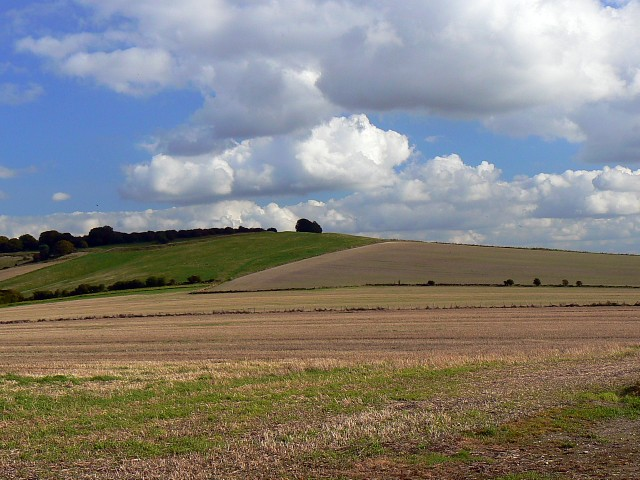
- Location of Quarley Hill Fort.
- Area of search: Hampshire
- Grid reference: SU 262 424
- Interest: Biological
- Area: 3.5 hectares (8.6 acres)
- Notification date: 1990
- Location map: Magic Map

Quarley Hill Fort is a 3.5-hectare (8.6-acre) biological Site of Special Scientific Interest west of Grateley in Hampshire.

Quarley hillfort is a hillfort with no public access, which is privately owned. This site on the land surrounding the Iron Age hill fort on Quarley Hill has chalk grassland which is maintained by cattle grazing. It is rich in herbs, such as felwort, small scabious, dropwort, chalk milkwort, greater butterfly-orchid and bastard toadflax.
