= Port Way =

Roman road in southern England

- The Portway
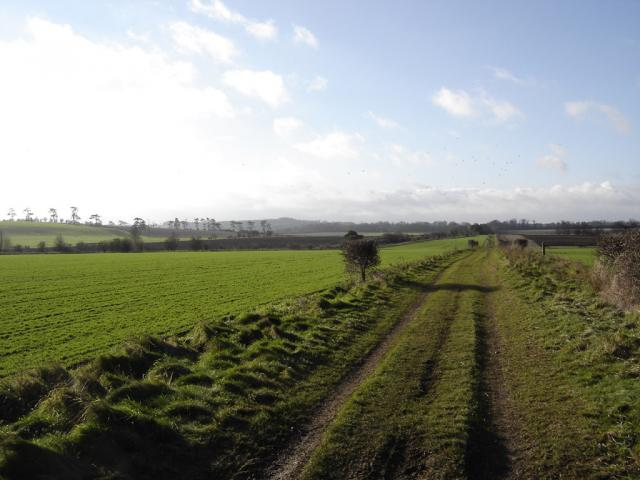

Route information
- Length: 36.25 mi (58.34 km)
- Margary number: 4b

Major junctions
- From: Calleva Atrebatum
- Venta Belgarum–Cunetio (Margary route 43)

Location
- Country: United Kingdom

Road network
- Roman roads in Britannia

Port Way (also known as the Portway) (Note: The name Portway Street has also been used) is an ancient road in southern England, which ran from Calleva Atrebatum (Silchester, in modern-day Hampshire) in a south-westerly direction to Sorbiodunum (Old Sarum, Wiltshire). Often associated with the Roman Empire, the road may have predated the Roman occupation of Britain.

By the time of the Roman occupation of Calleva Atrebatum and Sorbiodunum, the road formed part of a longer route between Londinium (London) and Isca Dumnoniorum (Exeter). The term "Port Way" is sometimes used to refer to this whole route, although the section between Londinium and Calleva Atrebatum is correctly known as The Devil's Highway, and the section between Sorbiodunum and Vindocladia (Badbury Rings) is Ackling Dyke.

The road was studied by antiquarians such as Sir Richard Colt Hoare, Henry MacLauchlan, Charles Roach Smith, Thomas William Shore, Thomas Codrington, and Ivan Margary, and much of the route can still be traced. The section east of Hannington in Hampshire, however, has not been definitively traced in over 100 years and sources differ on the precise route into the Roman town at Calleva Atrebatum.

Margary's Roman road numbering system, devised in the 1950s, gave the route from Londinium to Isca Dumnoniorum the number 4; the Port Way section is 4b. He recorded the distance of this section as 36 1/4 miles (58.3 km).

== Route ==
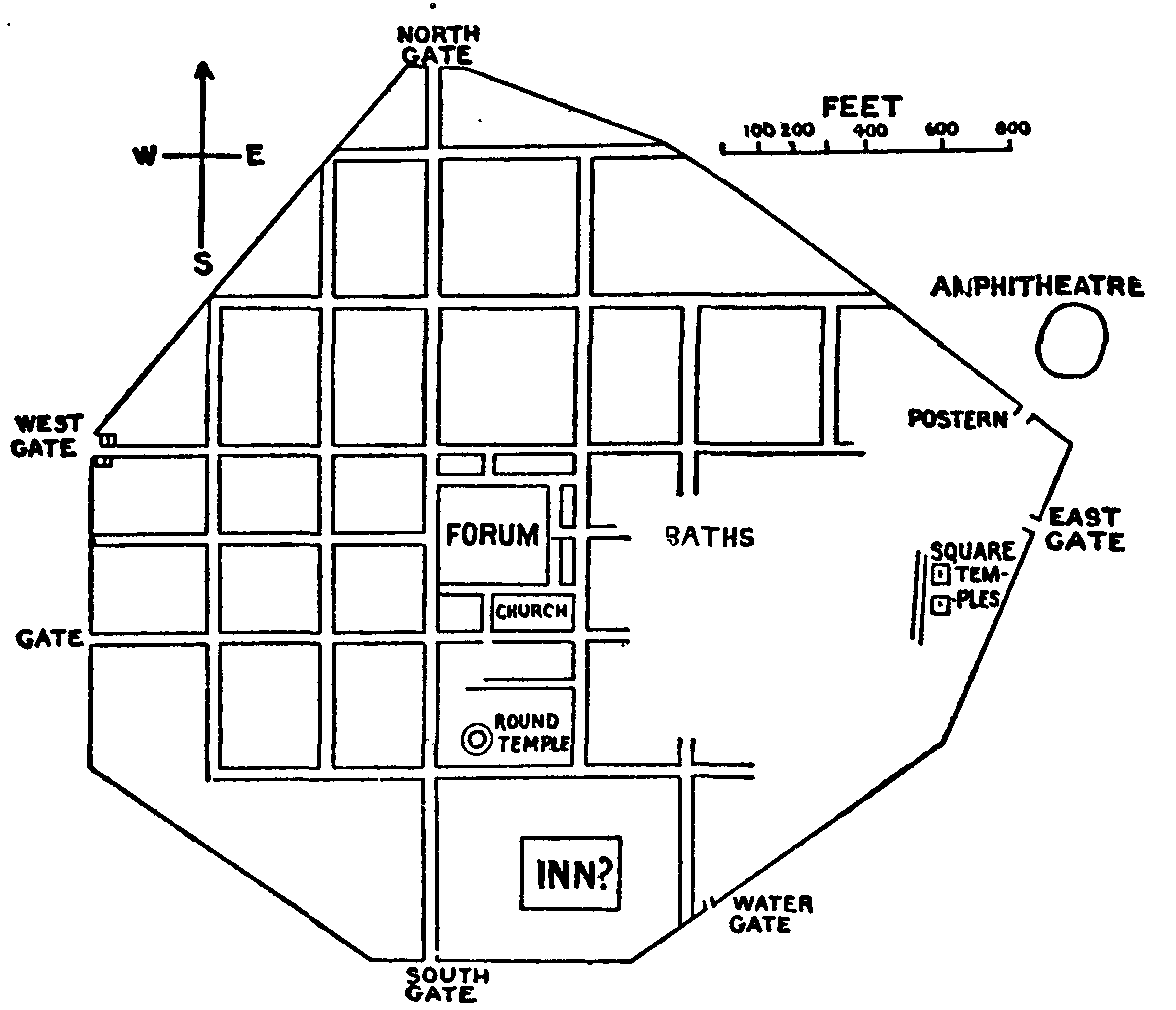
The road left Calleva Atrebatum at either the town's West Gate, the Lower West Gate to its south, or the South Gate

Port Way connected Calleva Atrebatum (Silchester) and Sorbiodunum (Old Sarum near Salisbury). Both towns predated the Roman occupation of Britain, and it is possible that the road is pre-Roman in origin. The name "Port Way" is Anglo-Saxon in origin, and like other ancient routes with the same name, refers to a road between market towns.

From Calleva Atrebatum, the road continued the south-westerly course of The Devil's Highway (Margary route 4a) from Londinium. (Note: It is possible that Margary route 3, from Londinium to Venta Icenorum (Norwich), was part of this greater route) Both Ivan Margary and Thomas Codrington believed the road left the town on its western side; Margary favoured the theory that it connected with the town's Lower West Gate, although it possibly connected with the main West Gate. Sir Richard Colt Hoare suggested that the road branched off Margary route 42 – the road from Calleva Atrebatum to Venta Belgarum (Winchester) – immediately outside the town's South Gate; this theory was supported in an 1846 article by the British Archaeological Association. (Note: One suggestion is that Port Way forked south-west of the town, with the main road continuing to the Lower West Gate but a secondary route joining the Venta Belgarum road to connect to the South Gate) The Ordnance Survey's 1911 25 inch to the mile map shows the road to be on a heading congruent with the theory it connected to Calleva Atrebatum's West Gate, although a 1989 article in the Society for the Promotion of Roman Studies' Britannia journal shows it leaving the town at the Lower West Gate.

Less than 200 yards (180 m) from Calleva Atrebatum, Port Way ran across an Iron Age entrenchment near to where the 1985–87 Silchester Hoard of coins and rings was discovered. The road passed near to (or cut across) the Flex Ditch near Silchester, another Iron Age earthwork. It continued south-west through Pamber Forest, towards Cottington Hill near the present-day village of Hannington.

From Cottington Hill, the road takes on the heading of Quarley Hill, near the present Hampshire–Wiltshire border, passes through St Mary Bourne and crosses the Bourne Rivulet. Beyond St Mary Bourne, near Finkley and East Anton, Port Way was crossed by Margary route 43, the road from Venta Belgarum to Cunetio (Mildenhall) sometimes described as being part of the Icknield Way. Approximately 1 mile (1.6 km) east of this crossroads was a mansio, the only significant settlement on the Port Way other than its termini. Hoare believed that this was the settlement of Vindomis, and the Ordnance Survey's 25 inch to the mile map of 1895 marks it as "ROMAN STATION / Supposed to be VINDOMIS". Charles Roach Smith wrote that the distance of Vindomis from Calleva Atrebatum given in the Antonine Itinerary – 15 miles (24 km) – did not "materially clash" with the idea that Vindomis was the settlement at this intersection. Despite this, Francis J. Haverfield wrote in 1915 that "there was no town or village at the crossing; so far as we know, there was not even a house at all". Contrary to Hoare's belief that this was the site of Vindomis, the discovery of the Calleva Atrebatum to Noviomagus Reginorum (Chichester) road led to the consensus that the settlement was in the area of present-day Neatham near Alton. No later than the 1730s, John Horsley had suggested that Vindomis was in the vicinity of Farnham (some 7 miles (11 km) from Neatham). If not Vindomis, the settlement at the East Anton crossroads may have been Leucomagus.

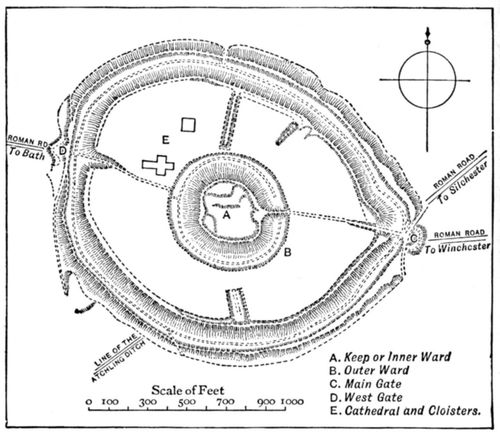
At Sorbiodunum, the road entered the town at its Main Gate on the eastern side

Quarley Hill provided a line-of-sight with Sorbiodunum, and from here the road took a south-west heading through the Bourne Valley into present-day Wiltshire, crossing the river between Winterbourne Gunner and Gomeldon. At Sorbiodunum, the road entered the town on its east side, where it was met by Margary route 45a, the road from Venta Belgarum. Beyond Sorbiodunum, the road continued south-west to Vindocladia (Badbury Rings) as Ackling Dyke (Margary route 4c), west-south-west to Durnovaria as Margary route 4e, and finally west to Moridunum (near Axminster) and Isca Dumnoniorum (Exeter) as Margary route 4f. (Note: Margary route 4d was a road from Vindocladia southwards to the port at Moriconium (Hamworthy))

Margary gave Portway the number 4b, and wrote that it was 36 1/4 miles (58.3 km) long. Both Calleva Atrebatum and Sorbiodunum are listed in Iter XV of the Antonine Itinerary, although the distance given between the two towns – 55 Roman miles (Note: The Roman Roads Research Association suggests there is an error in these measurements, and that the actual distance should be 48 Roman miles) – is via Vindomis and Venta Belgarum rather than a straight route along Port Way.

== Construction ==
In 1879, some 0.25 miles (0.40 km) of the road near St Mary Bourne was removed to provide better access for farm vehicles. The metalled road surface was found between 4 and 8 inches (100 and 200 mm) below ground level, and the road was approximately 24 feet (7.3 m) wide.

Further west, close to the Amesbury branch railway in the parish of Newton Tony, a section of the road in excellent preservation was carefully examined; Margary noted that both here and at Bradley Wood, the agger was 27 feet (8.2 m) wide. The road here was bottomed with chalk, then layered with 3–4 inches (76–102 mm) of flint, upon which a 12-inch (300 mm) layer of local gravel was laid. The road had been cambered to give a thickness of 18 centimetres (7 in) at the centre. There were V-shaped ditches on each side of the road, each 1 1/4 feet (0.38 m) deep and 3 feet (0.91 m) wide. These were situated roughly 32 feet (9.8 m) from the south kerb and 34 1/4 feet (10.4 m) from the north kerb, making a total width for the road zone of 84 1/4 feet (25.7 m) to the ditch centres.

== Legacy ==
In 1851, Henry MacLauchlan reported that the route could not be distinguished from Calleva Atrebatum until the area of Wolverton and Ewhurst, where farmers could occasionally observe the effects of the road in their cornfields. In 1889, Thomas William Shore described how the "great military road" could be traced to the gate in the wall at Calleva Atrebatum, although some of the Roman roads around the town had been "obliterated". In 1903, Codrington was unable to definitively trace the route between Calleva Atrebatum and Cottington Hill, although in the 1950s Margary stated that the agger was visible on the Tadley side of Pamber Forest and in farmland near Pamber Green, and traces of the road could be made out near Stoney Heath. Like MacLauchlan and Codrington, Margary reported that tracing the route from this area was difficult, with little to be seen until the area of Hannington. Here, the route of the road is now used by Meadham Lane, and a straight section of woodland known as Caesar's Belt is bordered on its north side by the road. A track continues on the route of the road through Bradley Wood, where it is recognised as a scheduled monument. After here, the course is lost to farmland. In the St Mary Bourne area, the route occasionally dictates or influences field boundaries, and at Middle Wyke, the Finkley Road follows its course into East Anton. As it crosses the Anton Valley, the course of the road again disappears before being used by the Andover–Monxton road. From here to Old Sarum, the alignment of the road is used by a number of lanes, tracks, and droves, as well as being paralleled by the West of England railway line as far as Idmiston. Referring to the Ordnance Survey's dead-straight projection of the road's course, Margary wrote that "near Quarley and Grateley it seems probable that the distinct ridge along the south side of the wide green lane marks it rather than the Ordnance Survey’s idealized straight line in the fields where there is no sign of it."

Archaeological excavations have found evidence of Roman villas along the Portway corridor at Balchester, Abbotts Ann, Grateley, Hurstbourne Priors, and Allington. Near the Balchester site was a Roman fort, although its circular plan suggests it predates Roman settlement.

A number of roads along the course of Margary route 4 use the name "Portway", including the road following the course west of Gomeldon and a residential road on The Devil's Highway in Riseley. In Andover, Port Way has given its name to numerous places on the road's course west of the town centre, including a cul-de-sac, the West and East Portway roads, and two schools. Both schools use the spoked wheel of a chariot in their crests. Early 21st-century residential developments near the Port Way/Icknield Way crossroads at East Anton include The Chariots and Augusta Park, and roads within the developments have been named after Roman emperors including Caesar, Claudius, Hadrian, Tiberius, and Vespasian, as well as Augustus's wife (and Tiberius's mother) Livia.
