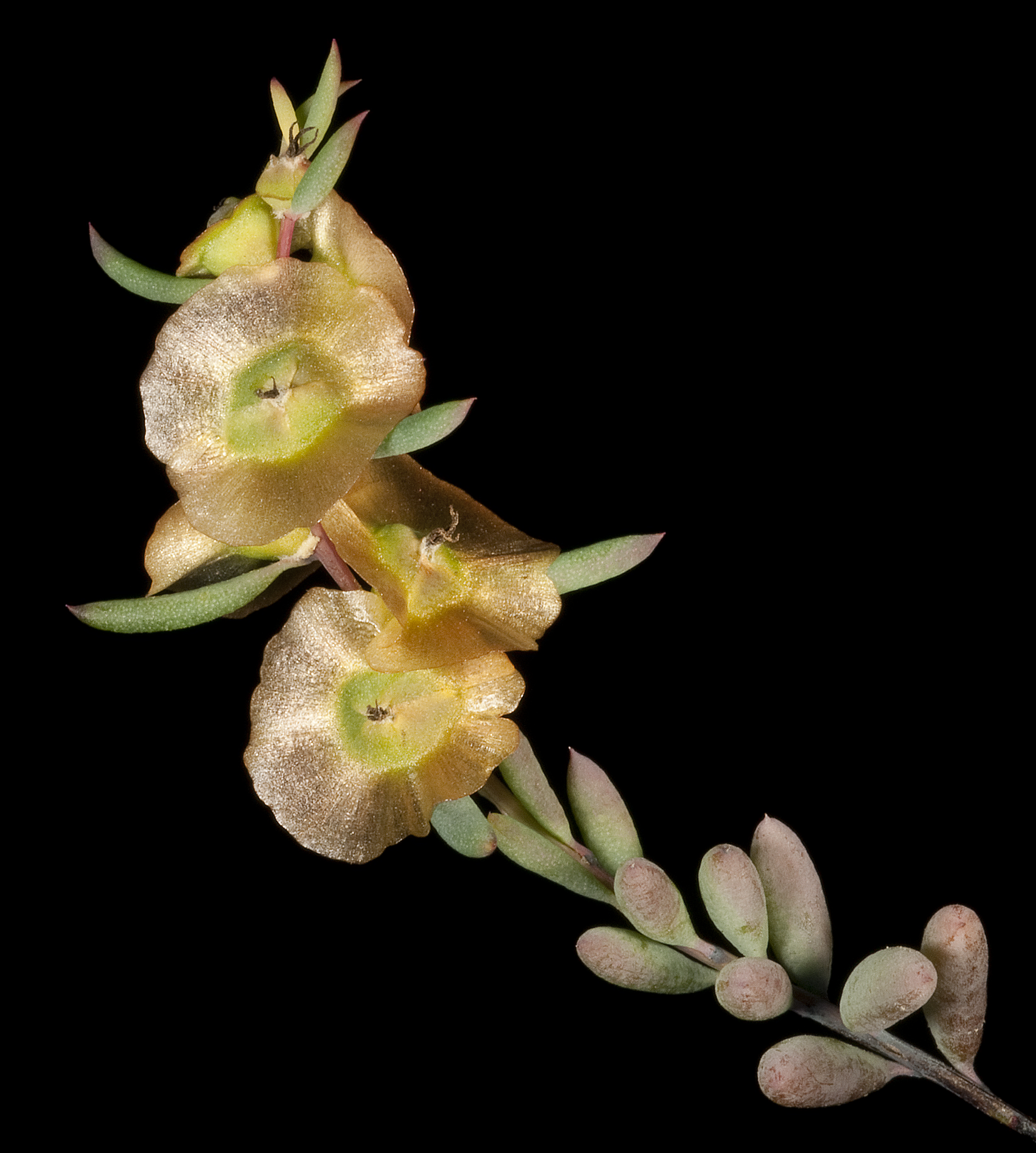

Scientific classification
- Kingdom: Plantae
- Clade: Tracheophytes
- Clade: Angiosperms
- Clade: Eudicots
- Order: Caryophyllales
- Family: Amaranthaceae
- Genus: Maireana
- Species: M. thesioides

Binomial name
- Maireana thesioides (C.A.Gardner) Paul G.Wilson

Synonyms
- Kochia thesioides C.A.Gardner

= Maireana thesioides =

Plant species

Maireana thesioides, commonly known as mulga bluebush or lax bluebush, is a plant in the Amaranthaceae family and is endemic to Western Australia. It is a weak, straggly, mostly glabrous shrub with slender, often drooping branches, fleshy, narrowly spindle-shaped leaves, flowers arranged singly and a crusty, glabrous fruiting perianth with a thin, horizontal wing.

== Description ==
Maireana thesioides is a weak, straggly shrub that typically grows to a height of about 1 m (3 ft 3 in) and is glabrous, apart from tufts of woolly hairs in the leaf axils. The branches are slender, striated and often drooping. The leaves are arranged alternately, narrowly spindle-shaped and fleshy, 5–15 mm (0.20–0.59 in) long and narrowed at the base with a distinct petiole. The flowers are bisexual and arranged singly, the fruiting perianth glabrous with a top-shaped tube about 3 mm (0.12 in) high with a thin, simple, horizontal wing 10–15 mm (0.39–0.59 in) in diameter with a single slit.

== Taxonomy ==
This species was first formally described in 1943 as Kochia thesioides by Charles Austin Gardner in the Journal of the Royal Society of Western Australia from a specimen he collected between Meekatharra and Wiluna. In 1972, Paul Graham Wilson transferred the species to Maireana as M. thesioides in the journal Nuytsia. The specific epithet (thesioides) means 'Thesium-like'.

== Distribution and habitat ==
Maireana thesioides grows on stony flats or in sub-saline areas from Koorda north to the Hamersley Range and east to Menzies in the Avon Wheatbelt, Carnarvon, Coolgardie, Gascoyne, Little Sandy Desert, Murchison, Pilbara and Yalgoo bioregions of central Western Australia.

== Conservation status ==
Maireana thesioides is listed as "not threatened" by the Government of Western Australia Department of Biodiversity, Conservation and Attractions.
