= Finklea =

Finklea is a surname. Notable people with the surname include:

- John Finklea (1933–2000), American physician, professor, researcher, and public health administrator
- Tula Ellice Finklea a.k.a. Cyd Charisse (1922–2008), American dancer and actress

== See also ==
- Finklea, South Carolina
- Finkley
