= Hookerian =

Hookerian is an eponymous adjective and may refer to:

- Joseph Dalton Hooker (1817–1911), British botanist and explorer
- Richard Hooker (1554–1600), Anglican priest and influential theologian
