= St John the Baptist's Church, Allington =

Coordinates: 51.1534°N 1.7095°W

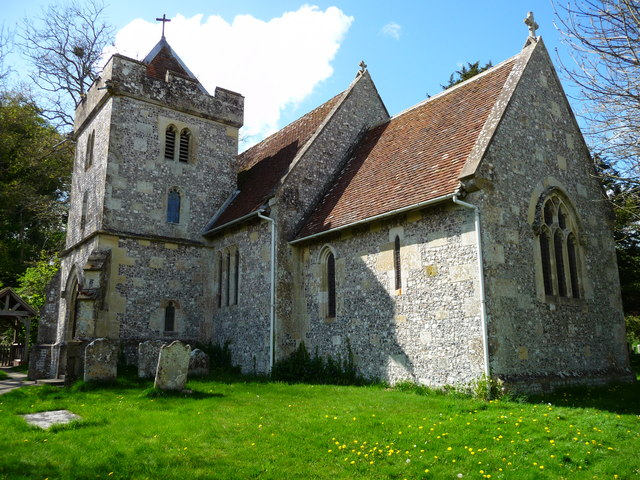
- St John the Baptist's Church, Allington, from the southeast

- Location in Wiltshire
- OS grid reference: SU 204 394
- Location: Allington, Wiltshire
- Country: England
- Denomination: Anglican
- Website: friendsoffriendlesschurches.org.uk/allington/

History
- Status: Parish church
- Dedication: Saint John the Baptist

Architecture
- Functional status: Redundant
- Heritage designation: Grade II
- Designated: 10 February 1958
- Architect: Fr William Grey
- Architectural type: Church
- Style: Norman, Gothic Revival
- Completed: 1851

Specifications
- Materials: Flint and limestone Tiled roofs

St John the Baptist's Church in the village of Allington, south-east of Amesbury in Wiltshire, England, is a redundant Anglican parish church which was rebuilt in 1851. The church is recorded in the National Heritage List for England as a Grade II listed building and has been in the care of the Friends of Friendless Churches since 2011.

== History ==
The earliest parts of the church date from the 12th century, but only fragments of this building remain, in the imposts of the chancel arch (rebuilt in the 19th century) and a portion of stonework from a Norman doorway, reset in the north wall. Most of the church was rebuilt between 1847 and 1851, the architect being the "priest-architect" Fr William Grey; the new building scrupulously reproduced the plan and details of its 13th-century predecessor, except that the timber belfry was replaced by masonry.

The benefice was united with Boscombe in 1924, and in 1970 the two parishes were amalgamated. Allington church was declared redundant on 1 February 2010, and was vested in the Friends of Friendless Churches in the following year.

== Architecture ==
=== Exterior ===
The church is constructed in knapped flint and limestone with limestone dressings. The roof is tiled. Its plan consists of a nave and a chancel, and a south porch that rises into a tower. The tower is in two stages with angle buttresses and a pyramidal tiled roof. In the upper stage are two-light bell openings, and at the summit is a crenellated parapet with gargoyles. The nave has doors on the north and south sides, the north door containing the Norman fragments. Along the sides of the nave are two- and three-light square-headed windows. In the chancel are two re-set lancet windows dating from the late 12th or early 13th century, and a three-light east window.

=== Interior ===
Inside the church, the wall of the nave is rendered and colour-washed; it has a 19th-century wagon roof. The interior of the chancel has stencil and freehand decoration executed in 1876 by Heaton, Butler and Bayne in memory of Revd Fulwar William Fowle, rector of the church for over 60 years. The chancel is floored with encaustic tiles. It contains a sedilia and a piscina. The stained glass in the east window is also by Heaton, Butler and Bayne, and depicts the Crucifixion.

The font dates from the 19th century and is a replica of the 12th-century original; its pyramidal pierced cover is from the 17th century. The pulpit is in oak, and dates from the 19th century. There are two pews from the 16th-17th century, and later pews designed to match them. In the porch is an oak churchwardens' coffer from the 16th-17th century with three locks, and a stool dating from the 17th century.

== Churchyard ==
In the churchyard are two structures that have also been listed at Grade II. One is a pair of limestone coffin tombs from the 18th century, one of them inscribed with the date 1728; the date on the other is illegible. The other listing covers two chest tombs from the early 19th century.

== Austen connection ==
A forerunner of Revd Fulwar William Fowle was Revd Thomas Fowle, vicar between 1793 and 1797, who was engaged to Cassandra Austen, sister of Jane, but who died before he could marry her. Fowle died of yellow fever in the West Indies while trying to raise sufficient funds for their marriage.
