= Boscombe, Wiltshire =

Village in Wiltshire, England

Coordinates: 51.145°N 1.715°W

Boscombe
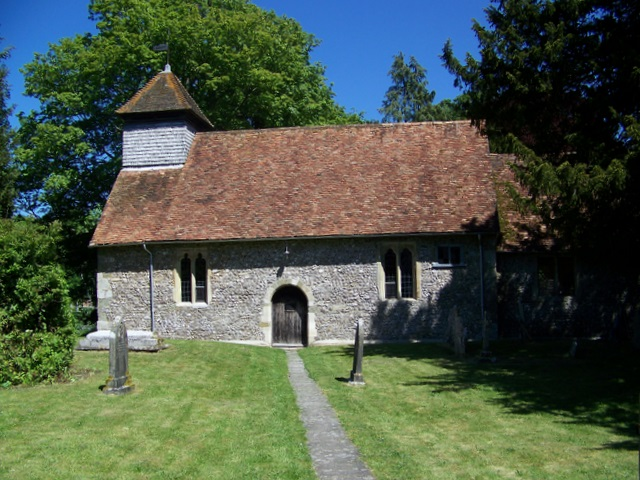
- St Andrew's Church, Boscombe

- Location within Wiltshire
- Civil parish: Allington
- Unitary authority: Wiltshire
- Ceremonial county: Wiltshire
- Region: South West
- Country: England
- Sovereign state: United Kingdom

Boscombe is a village in the civil parish of Allington, in Wiltshire, England. It lies about 3 miles (5 km) southeast of Amesbury on the banks of the River Bourne, on the A338 road which follows the Bourne on its way from Salisbury to Tidworth and beyond.

== History ==
The name Boscombe derives from the Old English borscumb, probably meaning 'combe (valley) with spiky plants'.

Domesday Book in 1086 recorded two estates with altogether 19 households: one (later called East Boscombe) held by the nobleman William of Eu and the other (West Boscombe) by Amesbury Abbey. According to John Marius Wilson's Imperial Gazetteer of England and Wales, in 1872 the Basingstoke and Salisbury railway ran through Boscombe, and there was a post office, almshouses and a Norman church. The population at that time was 143. By 1894 the population had fallen to 113 and the church was in poor condition.

The manor house at East Boscombe, known as Boscombe House, had 18 bedrooms by 1768; it was demolished around 1770. Owners included William Kent, an estate manager for the Earls of Pembroke, who bought the East Boscombe estate in 1628.

The former manor house at West Boscombe, Queen Manor, stands west of the church. It has a four-bay north block of c.1700 and rear wings of c.1835.

The Bourne follows a winding course here, and the road from Salisbury forded it in two places, south and northeast of the church, until bridges were built in the late 18th century or early 19th. The road was straightened in 1939, to take traffic over a new bridge further away from the church.

The ancient parish of Boscombe, which had land stretching both northwest and southeast onto the downs above the river, was added to Allington parish in 1934. West and East Boscombe were still marked on maps in the mid-20th century but today only the name Boscombe is used.

Boscombe had a school from 1894 to 1972; the nearest primary school is at Porton.

An RAF airfield was opened in 1930 on Boscombe Down, northwest of Boscombe towards Amesbury. Since 1939 the site has been a military aircraft test and research facility, now known as MoD Boscombe Down. Although the establishment's buildings are about 2 miles (3 km) from the village, the south end of one runway is about 900m from the centre of the village.

In 1931 the parish had a population of 117. On 1 April 1934 the parish was abolished and merged with Allington, its upstream neighbour.

== Parish church ==
A church at Boscombe was mentioned in the 12th century, and the thick walls of the chancel and nave of the present building may survive from that period. The church, dedicated to St Andrew since at least 1763, is built of flint with ashlar dressings; the square bell-turret at the west end is clad in shingles. The chancel roof and nave windows are from c.1500, and the transverse north aisle (now used as the vestry) was added c.1600. Restoration was undertaken in 1709 and the east wall was rebuilt in 1755. The nave was re-roofed in the 19th century and there was further restoration in 1936–8. The church was designated as Grade I listed in 1958.

The crudely carved stone font may be from the 12th century, and has a 17th-century cover. The wooden pulpit was installed in 1633, then repositioned and provided with a tester in 1709; a small window was added nearby to light it. The box pews may also have been installed in 1633 but were reworked in the 19th century. The bell-turret had two bells but only one remains, cast in 1676.

Richard Hooker, an influential theologian, was rector from 1591 to 1595: the income from this position supported him during the writing of his major work, Of the Laws of Ecclesiastical Polity, a critique of the Puritans. A later theologian, Francis Fox, who went on to become vicar of Reading, was rector from 1708 to 1711. Other incumbents include in 1738–1750 Charles Moss, later Bishop of Bath and Wells.

The benefices of Boscombe and Allington were united in 1924, and the incumbent (who had held both since 1891) was to live in the Allington parsonage house. In 1970 the parishes were united, and in 1973 they became part of the Bourne Valley benefice. St Andrew's became the sole parish church after the Allington church was declared redundant in 2010. At some point an amalgamation of parishes brought the church into the parish of Saint Nicholas Porton and District.

The former rectory, northeast of the church, began as a 15th-century hall house in flint and brick, and was made L-shaped by the addition of a north wing in 1836. The house was designated as Grade II* listed in 1987, by which time it was no longer church property.
