= GRT =

GRT may refer to:

== Businesses ==
- GRT Group, a defunct British bus operator
- General Recorded Tape, a defunct American company
  - GRT Records, their record label
- Grand River Transit, a Canadian public transport operator
- Guangdong Radio and Television, a Chinese broadcaster

== Places ==
- Grateley railway station, Hampshire, England (CRS code: GRT)
- Greenbrier River Trail, a state park in West Virginia, US

== Other uses ==
- Garo language, spoken in India and Bangladesh
- Grasser Racing Team, an Austrian motor racing team
- Gross register tonnage, a measure of a ship's volume
- An acronym for Gypsies, Roma and Travellers in the UK.
