= Palestine, Hampshire =

Village in Hampshire, England

Coordinates: 51.166°N 1.630°W

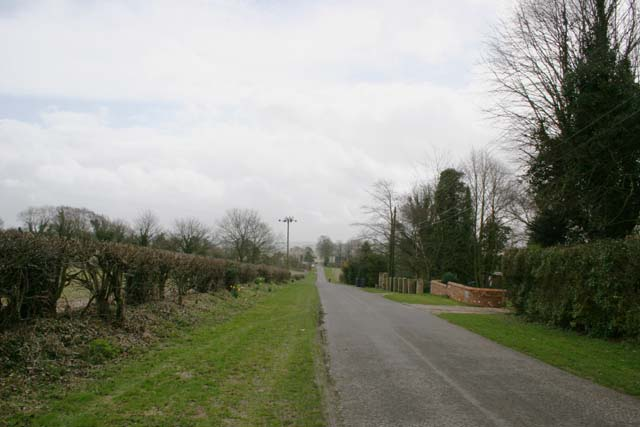
Palestine

Palestine is a small village which lies in the civil parish of Over Wallop, approximately 7 miles (11 km) south-west of Andover, in Hampshire, England.

It consists mainly of fields, farms and a few dozen houses with the built-up area having 283 residents at the 2011 Census. Most houses are built in a bungalow style.

The settlement adjoins the village of Grateley, which has a railway station, on the West of England main line, with hourly South Western Railway trains to London Waterloo and Salisbury, half hourly in peak times.

The village is serviced by one bus, the number 5 from/to Andover, Hampshire bus station, a few times a day during the week. This route also visits Quarley, Thruxton, Weyhill, and Monxton MOD.

The parish boundary runs down the centre of Streetway Road, meaning that when a new housing development was built on the north side of the road, the residents on the south side could not officially object, as the development was within a different parish.
