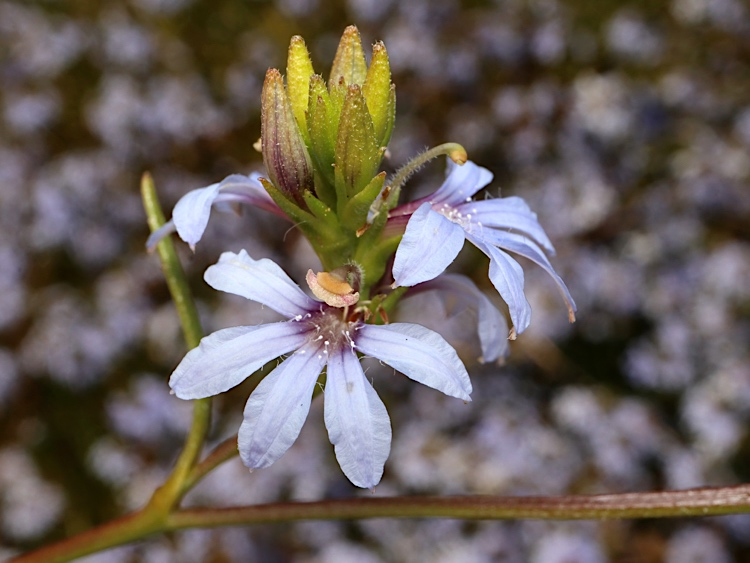
- Scaevola thesioides in Kings Park

Scientific classification
- Kingdom: Plantae
- Clade: Tracheophytes
- Clade: Angiosperms
- Clade: Eudicots
- Clade: Asterids
- Order: Asterales
- Family: Goodeniaceae
- Genus: Scaevola
- Species: S. thesioides

Binomial name
- Scaevola thesioides Benth.

Synonyms
- List: Lobelia thesioides (Benth.) Kuntze; Merkusia thesioides (Benth.) de Vriese; Scaevola dielsii E.Pritz.; Scaevola flaccida de Vriese; Scaevola paniculata de Vriese; Scaevola polystachya DC.; Scaevola squarrosa Lindl.

= Scaevola thesioides =

Silky scaevola

Species of flowering plant

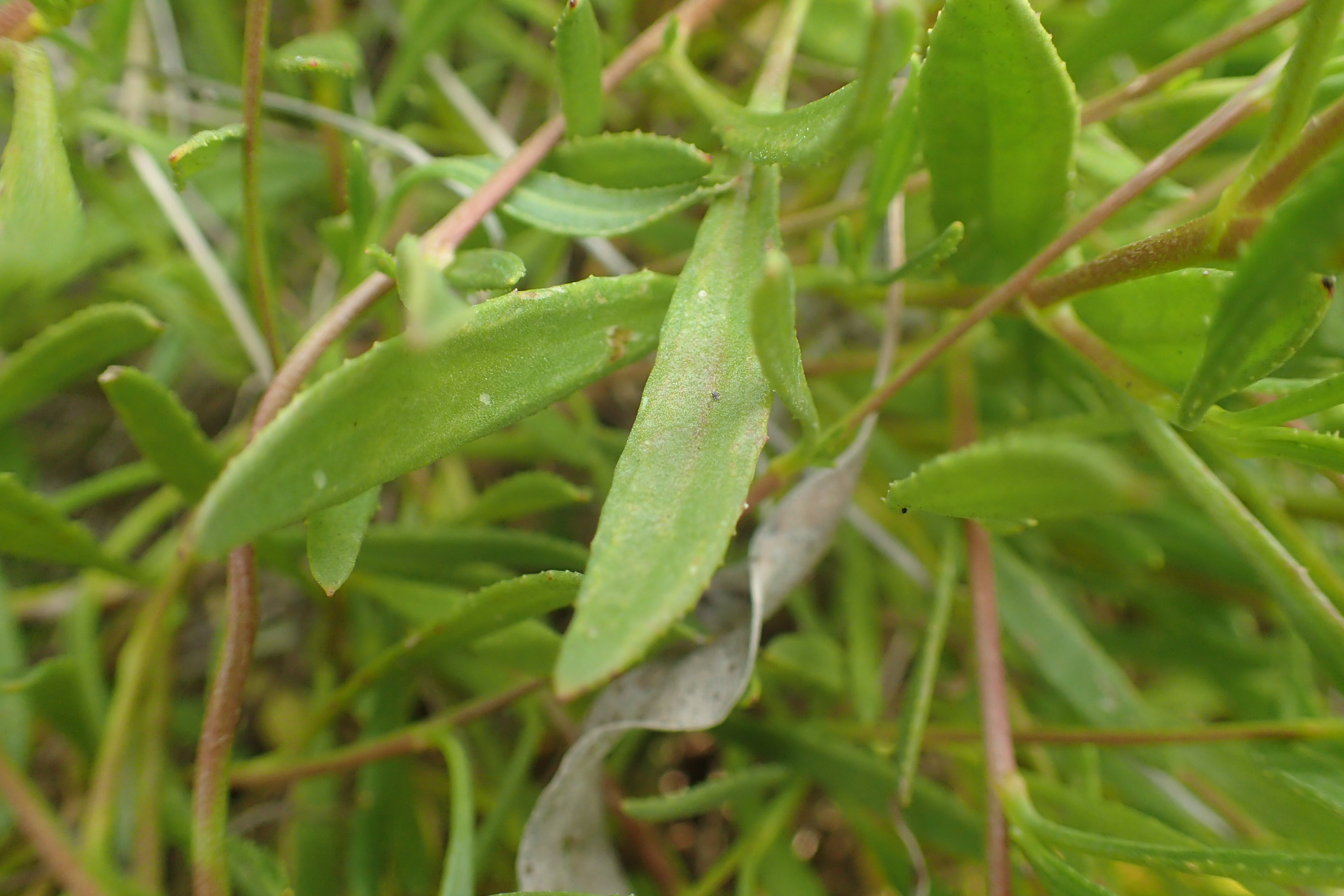
Mature leaf

Scaevola thesioides is a species of flowering plant in the family Goodeniaceae and is endemic to the southwest of Western Australia. It is a spreading subshrub to perennial herb with thread-like to lance-shaped leaves and hairy, fan-shaped, pale blue to white flowers.

== Description ==
Scaevola thesioides is a spreading subshrub to perennial herb that typically grows to a height of up to 1 m (3 ft 3 in) and is mostly glabrous. The leaves are sessile, thread-like to lance-shaped with the narrower end toward the base, 15–70 mm (0.59–2.76 in) long and up to 1–5 mm (0.039–0.197 in) wide. The flowers are arranged on the ends of branches in spikes up to 40 mm (1.6 in) long. The bracts are narrowly triangular or thread-like, 4–14 mm (0.16–0.55 in) long and the bracteoles thread-like and 2–6 mm (0.079–0.236 in) long. The petals are 5–9 mm (0.20–0.35 in) long, light blue to white, hairy inside, the wings about 0.6 mm (0.024 in) wide. Flowering mainly occurs from August to December and the fruit is cylindrical to oval, and about 3 mm (0.12 in) in diameter.

== Taxonomy ==
Scaevola thesioides was first formally described in 1837 by George Bentham and the description was published in Enumeratio plantarum quas in Novae Hollandiae ora austro-occidentali ad fluvium Cygnorum et in Sinu Regis Georgii collegit Carolus liber baro de Hügel. The specific epithet (thesioides) means Thesium-like.

== Distribution and habitat ==
This scaevola grows in near-coastal areas of south-western Western Australia in the Coolgardie, Esperance Plains, Geraldton Sandplains, Mallee and Swan Coastal Plain bioregions.
