= Allington, Salisbury =

Village in Wiltshire, England

Coordinates: 51.155°N 1.711°W

Allington
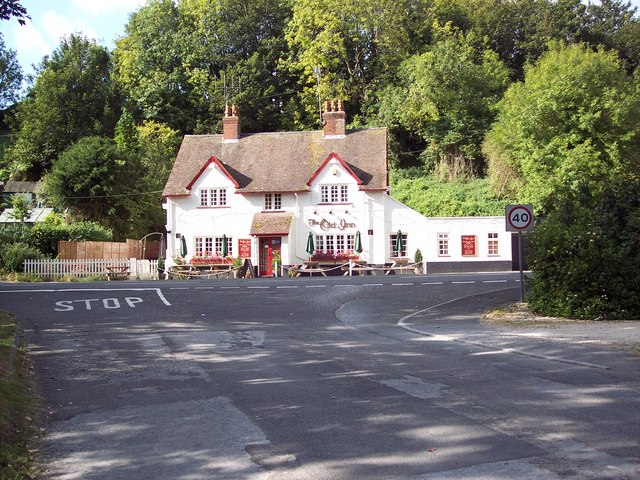
- The Old Inn, Allington

- Location within Wiltshire
- Population: 493 (in 2011)
- OS grid reference: SU203396
- Civil parish: Allington
- Unitary authority: Wiltshire
- Ceremonial county: Wiltshire
- Region: South West
- Country: England
- Sovereign state: United Kingdom
- Post town: Salisbury
- Postcode district: SP4
- Dialling code: 01980
- Police: Wiltshire
- Fire: Dorset and Wiltshire
- Ambulance: South Western
- UK Parliament: Salisbury
- Website: www.allingtonandboscombe.org.uk

Allington is a village and civil parish in Wiltshire, England, about 3 miles (5 km) southeast of Amesbury and 7 miles (11 km) northeast of Salisbury. The parish includes the village of Boscombe; both villages are on the River Bourne and the A338 road. Most of the west boundary of the parish is also the county boundary with Hampshire.

== History ==
The south of the parish has evidence of Iron Age settlement and a Romano-British villa; the Port Way Roman road crossed the parish in the southeast.

The name Allington derives from the Old English Ealdaingtūn meaning 'settlement connected with Ealda'.

Allington is recorded in the Domesday Book of 1086, when there were eight households and one mill at Alentone, on land held by Amesbury Abbey. By 1377, Allington was still a small village, with 35 poll-tax payers.

The settlement developed where a minor road from Winterslow forded the river and crossed the road from Salisbury; the Winterslow road was obliterated in the early 20th century by the military training area. The Salisbury road went through the centre of the village, passing east of the church, until 1835 when a short bypass was made, taking it immediately west of the church. At the southern end of the new section is a pub now called the Old Inn, an early 20th-century rebuilding of an establishment standing there in 1848 or earlier.

James Bell's A new and comprehensive gazetteer of England and Wales (1836) says:

ALLINGTON (formerly Aldington), a parish in the hundred of Amesbury, county of Wilts. The living is a rectory in the archdeaconry and diocese of Salisbury, valued in the king's books at £14 13s. 4d. and in 1839 in the patronage of the earl of Craven. There is a free school here. Distance from Amesbury 3 1/2 m. E.S.E. The population in 1801 was 75; and in 1831, 80. Assessed property, £721.

Boscombe had a school from 1902; after it closed in 1972, children attended the newly built school at Porton.

In 1934 the neighbouring small parish of Boscombe was added to Allington parish.

=== Military installations ===
Land in the southeast of the parish – the whole area southeast of the railway line – has been part of the Porton Down military training area since the early 20th century. The Porton Down science park, which houses the headquarters of the Ministry of Defence's Defence Science and Technology Laboratory, is nearby in Idmiston parish.

The military aircraft test establishment now known as MoD Boscombe Down encroaches on the northwest part of the parish. There was a small airfield on Boscombe Down in the First World War, which was reopened in 1930 as a bomber base and then repurposed in 1939 as an aircraft research and testing station.

== Religious sites ==
The Church of England parish church of St Andrew at Boscombe dates from the 14th century and is Grade I listed. Nearby, the former rectory began as a hall house in the 15th century and is now Grade II* listed.

The church of St John the Baptist at Allington is an 1851 rebuilding of a church which was largely 13th-century; the new building kept the same plan and details, and incorporated fragments of 12th-century stonework. It was declared redundant in 2010 and is now in the care of the Friends of Friendless Churches.

The benefices of Allington and Boscombe were united in 1924, and the incumbent was to live in the Allington parsonage house. In 1970 the parishes were united, and in 1973 they became part of the Bourne Valley Benefice. St Andrew's became the sole parish church after the Allington church was declared redundant in 2010.

A cottage at Allington was converted into a Primitive Methodist chapel in 1843 and extended in 1981. By 2014 the building had returned to private occupation.

== Railways ==
The Andover to Salisbury railway opened across the southeast of the parish in 1857. In the north of the parish, the Amesbury and Military Camp Light Railway was built in 1901 to serve Bulford Camp, with a station at Newton Tony where the line crossed the Allington road. This line closed to passengers in 1952, with goods services continuing until 1963.
