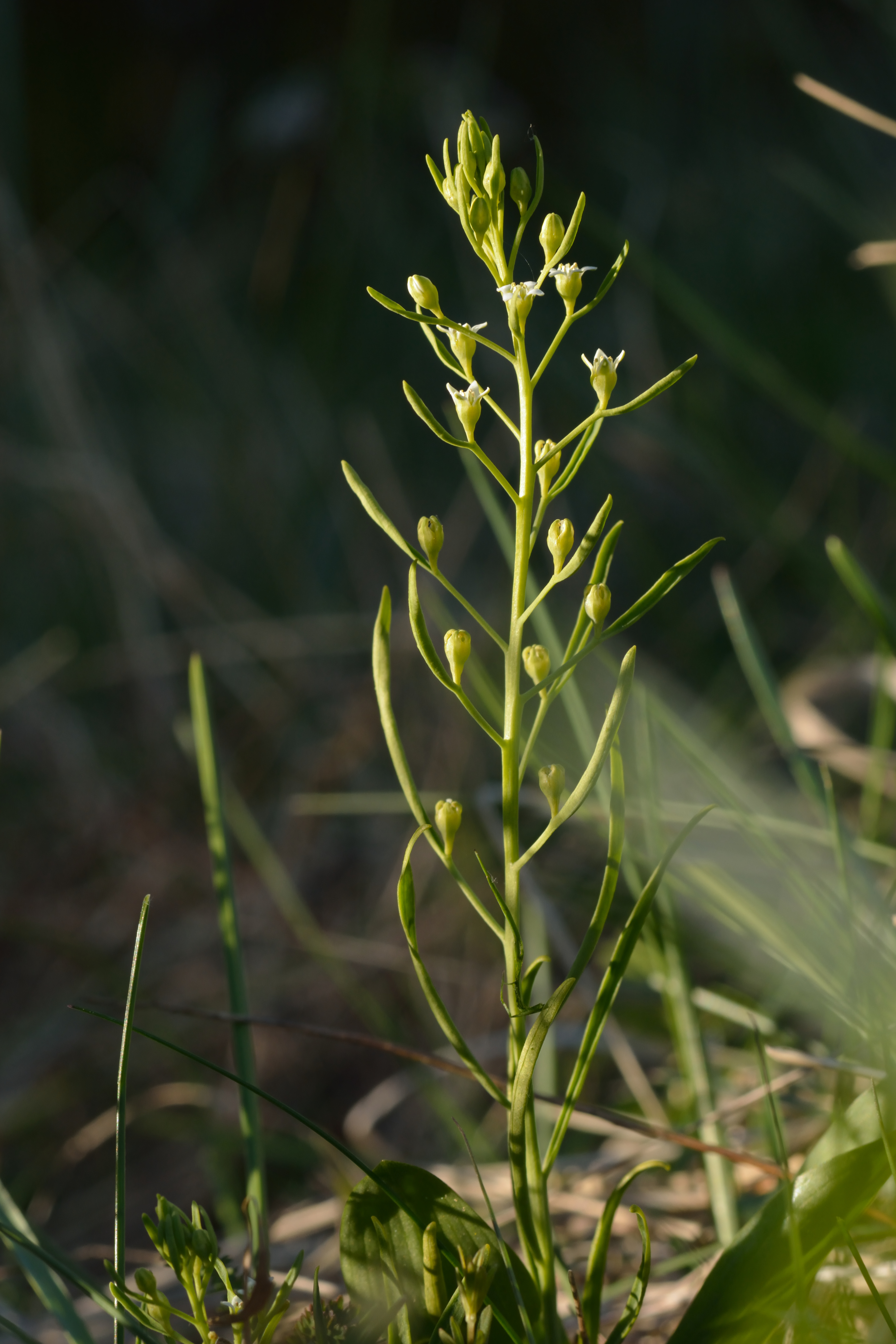

Scientific classification
- Kingdom: Plantae
- Clade: Tracheophytes
- Clade: Angiosperms
- Clade: Eudicots
- Order: Santalales
- Family: Santalaceae
- Genus: Thesium
- Species: T. ebracteatum

Binomial name
- Thesium ebracteatum Hayne

= Thesium ebracteatum =

Species of flowering plant

Thesium ebracteatum is a species of flowering plant belonging to the family Santalaceae.

Its native range is Northern Central and Eastern Europe to Western Siberia.
