= Francis Fox (divine) =

English divine

- Born: 1675; Brentford
- Died: 1738 (aged 62–63); Reading
- Occupation: divine

Francis Fox (1675–1738) was an English divine who became vicar of Reading.

Fox, son of Francis Fox, was born at Brentford in 1675. He entered St Edmund Hall, Oxford, as a commoner in April 1698, after having, according to Hearne, served six and a half years of his time as apprentice to a glover in London. He took the degree of B.A. in 1701, and that of M.A. in 1704. In 1705 he was chaplain to the lord mayor, Sir Owen Buckingham, and apparently about this time was 'commonly known as Father Fox'. Bishop Burnet appointed him rector of Boscombe, Wiltshire, in 1708, and promoted him to the vicarage of Potterne in 1711. He was chaplain to Lord Cadogan, and, from 1713 till his death, prebendary of Salisbury. In 1726 the Lord Chancellor presented him to the vicarage of St Mary's, Reading. There he died in July 1738.

== Politics ==
He was, at any rate for most of his life, a strong Whig, and in 1727 he preached at what was called the Reading lecture a sermon which gave great offence to a number of the clergy who formed the audience. After being repeated as an assize sermon at Abingdon, it was published under the title of Judgment, Mercy, and Fidelity, the Weightier Matters or Duties of the Law (Matt. xxiii. 23). It was considered to undervalue the efficacy of the sacraments, and to depreciate unduly the usefulness of preaching against dissenters. Angry letters about it were exchanged between Fox and the Rev. Joseph Slade of St Laurence's, Reading, who eventually published a sermon in reply to it, with the letters prefixed. This in its turn was attacked by the Rev. Lancelot Carleton in 'A Letter to the Rev. Jos. Slade'.

== Publications ==
Besides the sermon, 'Judgment, Mercy, and Fidelity', Fox published:

1. ‘The Superintendency of Divine Providence over Human Affairs,’ a sermon preached in St Paul's before the lord mayor on Restoration-day, 1705.
2. An anonymously printed folio sheet entitled ‘The Obligations Christians are under to shun Vice and Immorality and to practise Piety and Virtue shown from the express words of Holy Scripture,’ about 1707.
3. ‘The Lawfulness of Oaths and the Sin of Perjury and Profane Swearing,’ an assize sermon at Salisbury, 1710.
4. ‘The Duty of Public Worship proved, with directions for a devout behaviour therein,’ 1713 (19th ed. S.P.C.K., 1818).
5. ‘A Sermon on the Sunday next after 5 Nov.’ (Num. xxiii. 23), 1715.
6. ‘The New Testament, with references and notes,’ 1722.
7. ‘An Introduction to Spelling and Reading, containing lessons for children,’ 7th ed. 1754.
