= Thesium australe =

Conservation status
- Vulnerable (EPBC Act)

Scientific classification
- Kingdom: Plantae
- Clade: Tracheophytes
- Clade: Angiosperms
- Clade: Eudicots
- Order: Santalales
- Family: Santalaceae
- Genus: Thesium
- Species: T. australe

Binomial name
- Thesium australe R.BR

Species of shrub

Thesium australe is a prostrate erect perennial shrub which is endemic to the eastern coast of Australia.

== Distribution & habitat ==
Thesium australe occurs in the north from Bundaberg, Dalby, and Carnarvon National Park in Queensland and south into New South Wales, Australian Capital Territory and Victoria. The species is extinct in Tasmania.

== Conservation status ==
Thesium australe is listed as "vulnerable" under the Australian Government Environment Protection and Biodiversity Conservation Act 1999. It is listed as "Vulnerable" under the Queensland Nature Conservation Act 1992, "Vulnerable" under the New South Wales Biodiversity Conservation Act 2016 (NSW), "vulnerable" under the ACT Nature Conservation Act 2014. In Victoria it is listed as "Threatened" under the Flora and Fauna Guarantee Act 1988 although it meets the criteria to be listed as "endangered". It is considered "extinct" in Tasmania as only one specimen was collected in 1804 by Robert Brown and has not been observed in Tasmania since.
