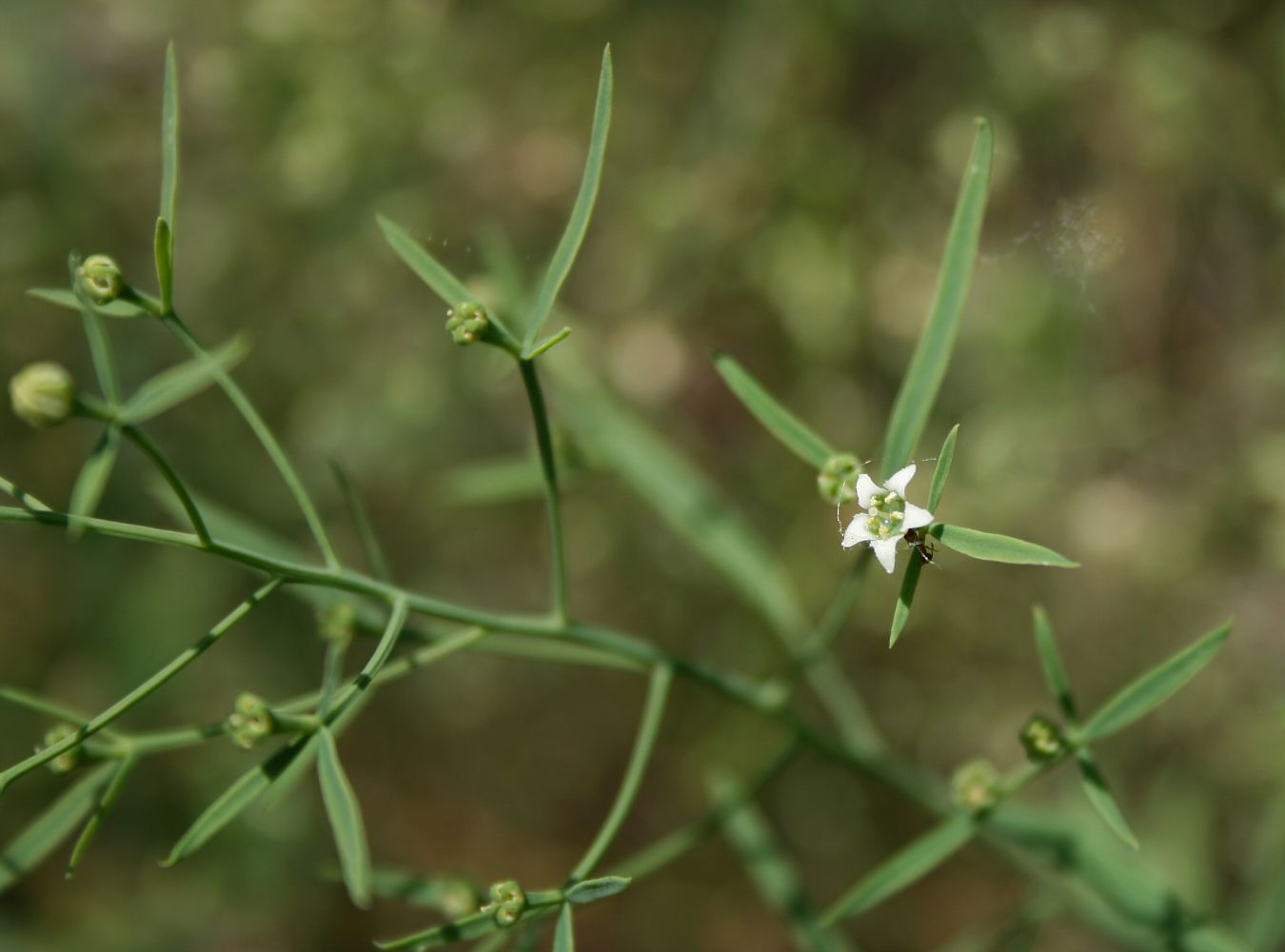

Scientific classification
- Kingdom: Plantae
- Clade: Embryophytes
- Clade: Tracheophytes
- Clade: Spermatophytes
- Clade: Angiosperms
- Clade: Eudicots
- Order: Santalales
- Family: Santalaceae
- Genus: Thesium
- Species: T. linophyllon

Binomial name
- Thesium linophyllon L.

= Thesium linophyllon =

Species of flowering plant

Thesium linophyllon is a species of flowering plant belonging to the family Santalaceae.

Its native range is France to Latvia and Central Greece.

Synonym:

- Linophyllum clusii Bubani
- Linosyris intermedia (Schrad.) Kuntze
- Linosyris linophyllon Kuntze
- Thesium arvense Horv.
- Thesium fulvopes Griess.
- Thesium hutterianum Opiz
- Thesium intermedium Schrad.
- Thesium linariae-folium Gilib.
- Thesium linifolium Christm.
- Thesium linifolium Schrank
- Thesium linophyllon var. pilosiusculum Lawalrée
- Thesium transsilvanicum Schur
- Xerololophus trinervis Dulac
