= Quarley Hill =

Iron Age hillfort in Hampshire, England

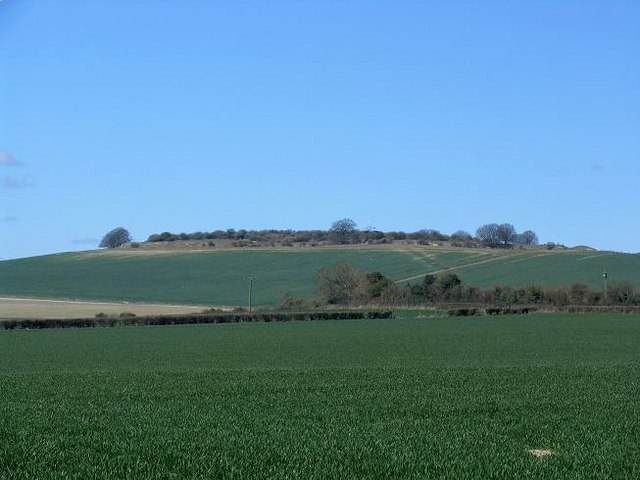
- Quarley Hill

- Location within Hampshire
- 51.1796°N 1.6260°W
- Periods: Iron Age
- Location: Hampshire

Site notes
- Area: 5 acres (2.0 ha)
- Public access: on private farmland, but a public footpath passes close by to the south

Quarley Hill is the site of an Iron Age univallate hill fort in Hampshire, southern England. The hill affords commanding views of the surrounding countryside.

Oval in plan, the fort is in good condition with a counter-scarp and well defined entrances at north-east and south-west. It is built on the site of an earlier palisade enclosure. There is evidence of prehistoric activity in the area including four large Bronze Age ditches radiating from the hill fort, believed to be part of a Bronze Age farming settlement, and a barrow cemetery about a mile away to the north. There is also evidence for a Roman settlement on the northeast side of the hill, with Roman coins of Maximum II and Constantine the Great, and other sherds found in 1951.

Today, the ditches and ramparts are for the most part clear, with the centre of the site given over to small trees and shrubs. The site is recorded as a scheduled ancient monument no.67.

The fort is surrounded by a Site of Special Scientific Interest called Quarley Hill Fort.

== Location ==
The site is at grid reference SU263423, to the south-west of the village of Quarley, and to the north-west of the village of Grateley in the county of Hampshire. The Port Way Roman road passes just to the south of the hill, running southwest to northeast. The hill's summit is at 172 metres above sea level.

== See also ==
- List of places in Hampshire
- List of hill forts in England
