= Thesium lacinulatum =

Scientific classification
- Kingdom: Plantae
- Clade: Tracheophytes
- Clade: Angiosperms
- Clade: Eudicots
- Order: Santalales
- Family: Santalaceae
- Genus: Thesium
- Species: T. lacinulatum

Binomial name
- Thesium lacinulatum A.W.Hill

Synonyms
- Thesium cruciatum A.W.Hill

Southern African plant species

Thesium lacinulatum is a species of plant from South Africa and Namibia.

== Description ==
Thesium lacinulatum is a bush that grows to be about 30 cm (1 ft) tall. The tips of the branches are spiny. It is fully covered in very short hairs. The leaves are rigid and grow closely against the stem. They are slender and lance-shaped with brownish tips.

The axillary flowers have small scaly bracts with tapering tips. The anthers extend past the conical perianth tube. The fruits are bright green and spherical. They are slightly reticulate between their ten ribs.

== Distribution and habitat ==
This plant grows in dry shrubland areas of South Africa and Namibia. In South Africa it grows in the Northern Cape and Western Cape provinces.

== Uses ==
The roots are crushed and boiled for use in traditional medicine in Namibia.
