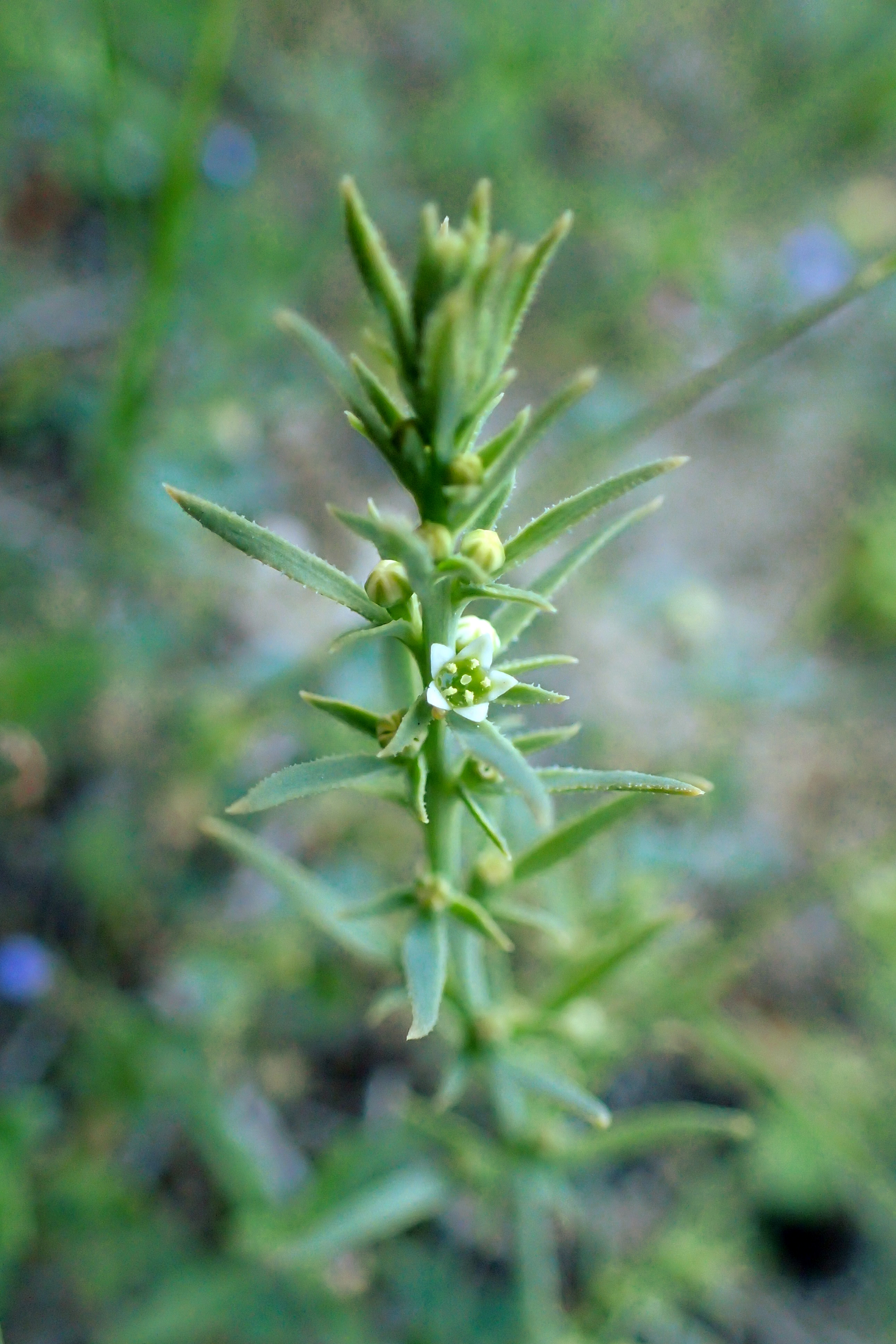

Scientific classification
- Kingdom: Plantae
- Clade: Tracheophytes
- Clade: Angiosperms
- Clade: Eudicots
- Order: Santalales
- Family: Santalaceae
- Genus: Thesium
- Species: T. humile

Binomial name
- Thesium humile Vahl

= Thesium humile =

Species of plant

Thesium humile is a species of annual herb in the family Santalaceae. They have a self-supporting growth form and simple, broad leaves. Individuals can grow to 0.2 m.

== Sources ==
This article incorporates text from a free content work. Licensed under CC0 (license statement/permission). Text taken from Thesium humile. Encyclopedia of Life.
