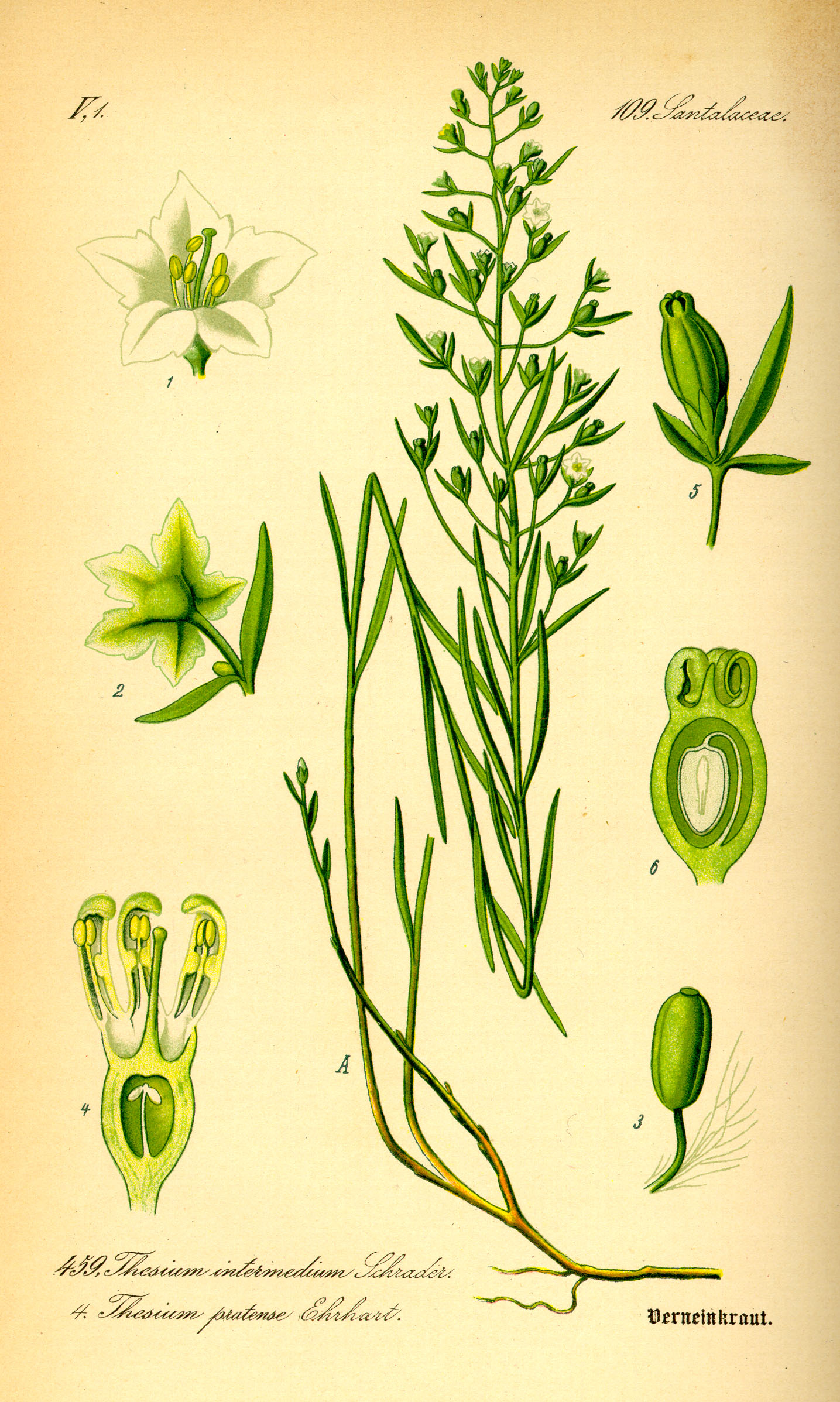
- Illustration Thesium pyrenaicum

Scientific classification
- Kingdom: Plantae
- Clade: Tracheophytes
- Clade: Angiosperms
- Clade: Eudicots
- Order: Santalales
- Family: Santalaceae
- Genus: Thesium
- Species: T. pyrenaicum

Binomial name
- Thesium pyrenaicum Pourr.

Synonyms
- Thesium pratense Ehrh. ex Schrad.

= Thesium pyrenaicum =

Species of flowering plant

Thesium pyrenaicum is a species in the genus Thesium of the sandalwood family, Santalaceae. The genera and species of this family are usually semiparasites feeding on other plants. T. pyrenaicum or meadowflax is a perennial herb between 15 and 50 cm (5.9 and 19.7 in) high. It occurs in Western Europe. With standing stem(s) the leaves are lineal, with three veins, alternate, without stipules. The flowers, with 3-5 petals, are tube-shaped, and bloom in June and July. The petal tops roll in during the fruiting season. It has 5-9 stamen with distinct ovaries. The seeds are nutlike. The fruit is shorter than the flower.
