= St Andrew's Church, Boscombe, Wiltshire =

Church in Wiltshire, England

St Andrew's Church, Boscombe
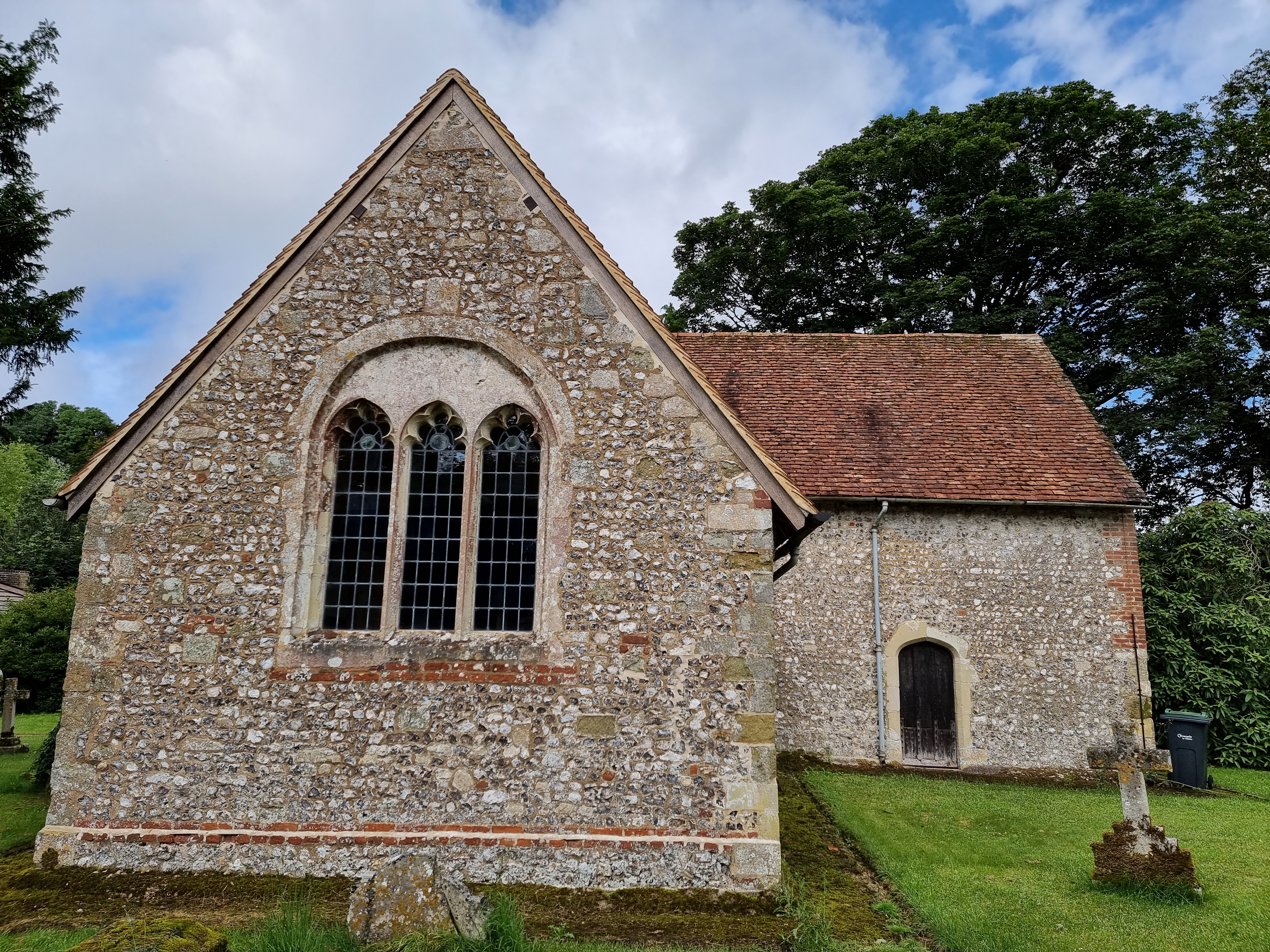

Religion
- Affiliation: Anglicanism

Location
- Location: Boscombe, Wiltshire, England
- Interactive map of St Andrew's Church, Boscombe
- Coordinates: 51.146°N 1.7147°W

Architecture
- Type: Church
- Completed: 13th century

St Andrew's Church is a historic church in the village of Boscombe, Wiltshire, England.

== History ==
The church was constructed in the 13th century, in flint and rubble. Historic England classified it as a Grade I listed building on 18 February 1958.

Richard Hooker the famous sixteenth century theologian and reformist was rector for the church between 1591 and 1595, during which time many of his most well-known ecclesiastical literature was published

== See also ==
- List of Anglican churches
