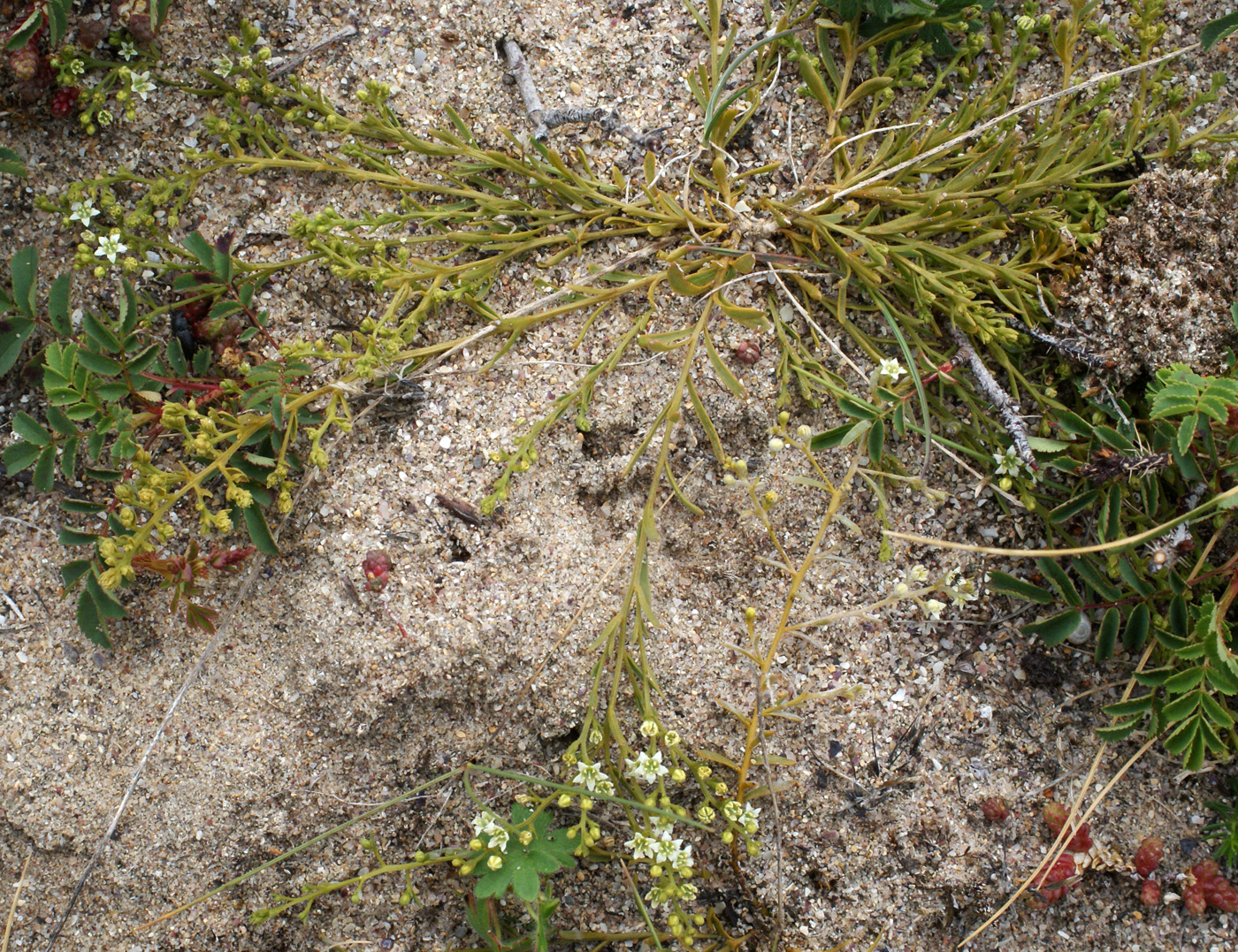

Scientific classification
- Kingdom: Plantae
- Clade: Tracheophytes
- Clade: Angiosperms
- Clade: Eudicots
- Order: Santalales
- Family: Santalaceae
- Genus: Thesium
- Species: T. humifusum

Binomial name
- Thesium humifusum DC.

= Thesium humifusum =

Genus of flowering plant in the mistletoe family Santalaceae

Thesium humifusum is a species of hemiparasitic flowering plant in the family Santalaceae found in western Europe and north-western Africa, known as bastard-toadflax.

== Distribution ==
Within continental Europe, Thesium humifusum is found throughout France, Spain and Italy. In the Netherlands, it is very rare, being now restricted to a single dune system near Katwijk aan Zee. In Belgium, it can be found in coastal dunes in Flanders, and perhaps one site in Wallonia. It is the only species of Thesium in Great Britain, and is there considered 'scarce'. Thesium humifusum may also occur in parts of North Africa.

== Ecology ==
Thesium humifusum is a hemiparasitic plant that steals nutrients from hedge bedstraw (Galium album) or lady's bedstraw (Galium verum). Although it can be abundant in appropriate habitats, its low growth habit and inconspicuous flowers mean that it is often overlooked. In Great Britain, it is restricted to downlands over chalk or oolitic limestone in southern England. Elsewhere, it may also grow in sand dune systems.

== Description ==
Thesium humifusum usually grows flat along the ground, only occasionally producing more erect flowering stems. Its leaves are a yellowish green colour and are strap-shaped and up to 25 mm (1 in) long, with a single central vein. The flowers are also yellowish, and only 2–3 mm (0.08–0.1 in) long. They have five tepals, five stamens, and a single ovary with three ovules and one style.

== Taxonomy ==
Thesium humifusum was first described by Augustin Pyramus de Candolle in the 1815 third edition of his Flore Française. In English, it is known simply as 'bastard-toadflax'.
