= Finkley =

Hamlet in Hampshire, England

Coordinates: 51.232105°N 1.446773°W

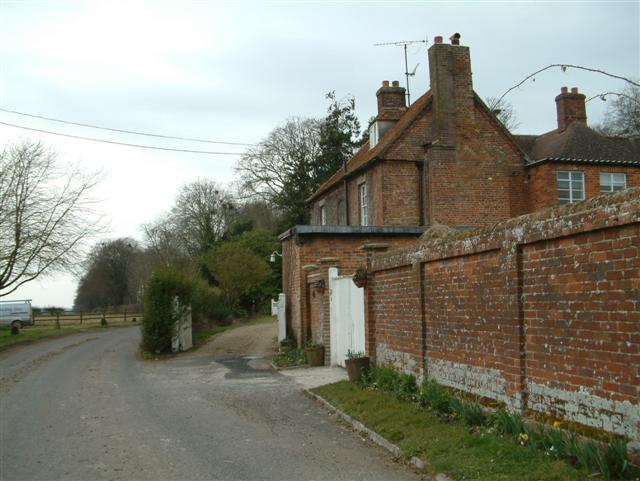
- Finkley Manor Farm

- Location within Hampshire
- OS grid reference: SU3872348247
- District: Test Valley
- Shire county: Hampshire
- Region: South East
- Country: England
- Sovereign state: United Kingdom
- Post town: Andover
- Postcode district: SP11
- Dialling code: 01264
- Police: Hampshire and Isle of Wight
- Fire: Hampshire and Isle of Wight
- Ambulance: South Central
- UK Parliament: North West Hampshire

Finkley is a hamlet in the Test Valley district of Hampshire, England. The nearest town is Andover, which lies approximately 2.8 miles (4.2 km) south-west from the hamlet. At the 2011 Census the population was included in the civil parish of Smannell.

Finkley Manor Farmhouse is an 18th century vernacular building that is located beside the route of the ancient Portway road.
