= Grateley railway station =

Railway station in Hampshire, England

Coordinates: 51.170°N 1.621°W

Grateley
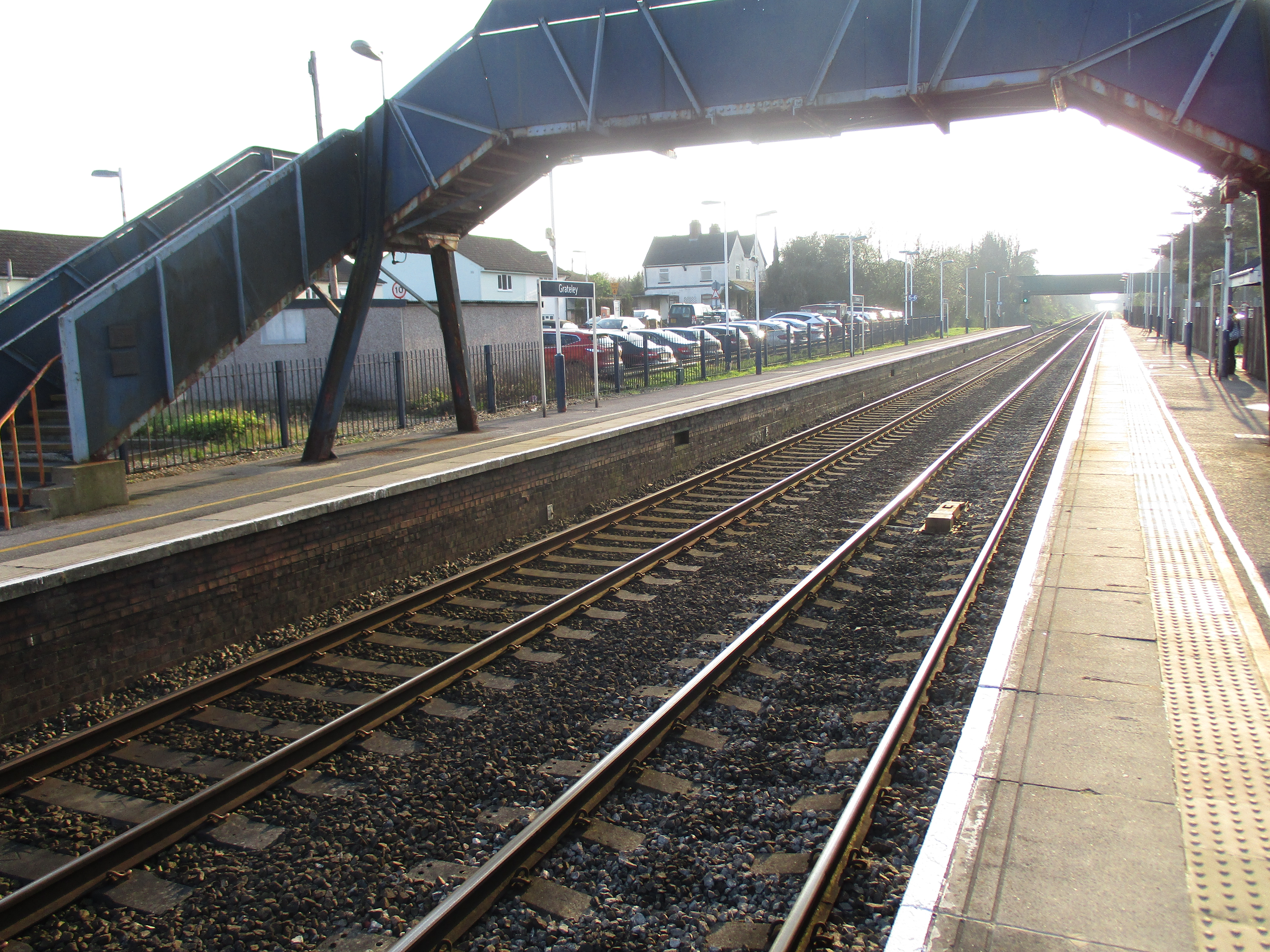

General information
- Location: Grateley, Test Valley; England
- Grid reference: SU266413
- Managed by: South Western Railway
- Platforms: 2

Other information
- Station code: GRT
- Classification: DfT category F1

History
- Opened: 1857

Passengers
- 2020/21: ▼46,490
- 2021/22: ▲0.122 million
- 2022/23: ▲0.173 million
- 2023/24: ▲0.215 million
- 2024/25: ▲0.281 million
Location
Notes
- Passenger statistics from the Office of Rail and Road

Grateley railway station serves the village of Grateley, Hampshire, England, and the surrounding countryside. It is 72 miles 49 chains (116.9 km) down the line from London Waterloo. It is operated by South Western Railway.

The station opened on 1 May 1857. It was built 3/4 mile (1.2 km) southwest of Grateley village, near the hamlet of Palestine, after the local landowner objected to it being built any closer. Since then, a new settlement has grown up around the station.

On 5 June 1861, the Grateley station master was killed as a result of a driver and guard rushing to move freight wagons.

The station has few facilities and is unstaffed. There is a self-service ticket machine on platform 1 and smartcard readers on both platforms. There are two car parks for the large number of commuters who use the station. Displays on each platform show the next two trains. All trains are operated by South Western Railway.

== Services ==
South Western Railway operates an hourly service between London Waterloo and Salisbury with limited extensions to Bristol Temple Meads, Exeter St Davids and Yeovil Pen Mill. A seasonal service runs once each way on a Saturday between Waterloo and Weymouth, operating from late May to early September.

Trains are once per hour each way on weekdays, then decreasing to once every two hours each way on Sundays.

Preceding station	National Rail	Following station
Andover	South Western Railway; West of England Main Line	Salisbury
