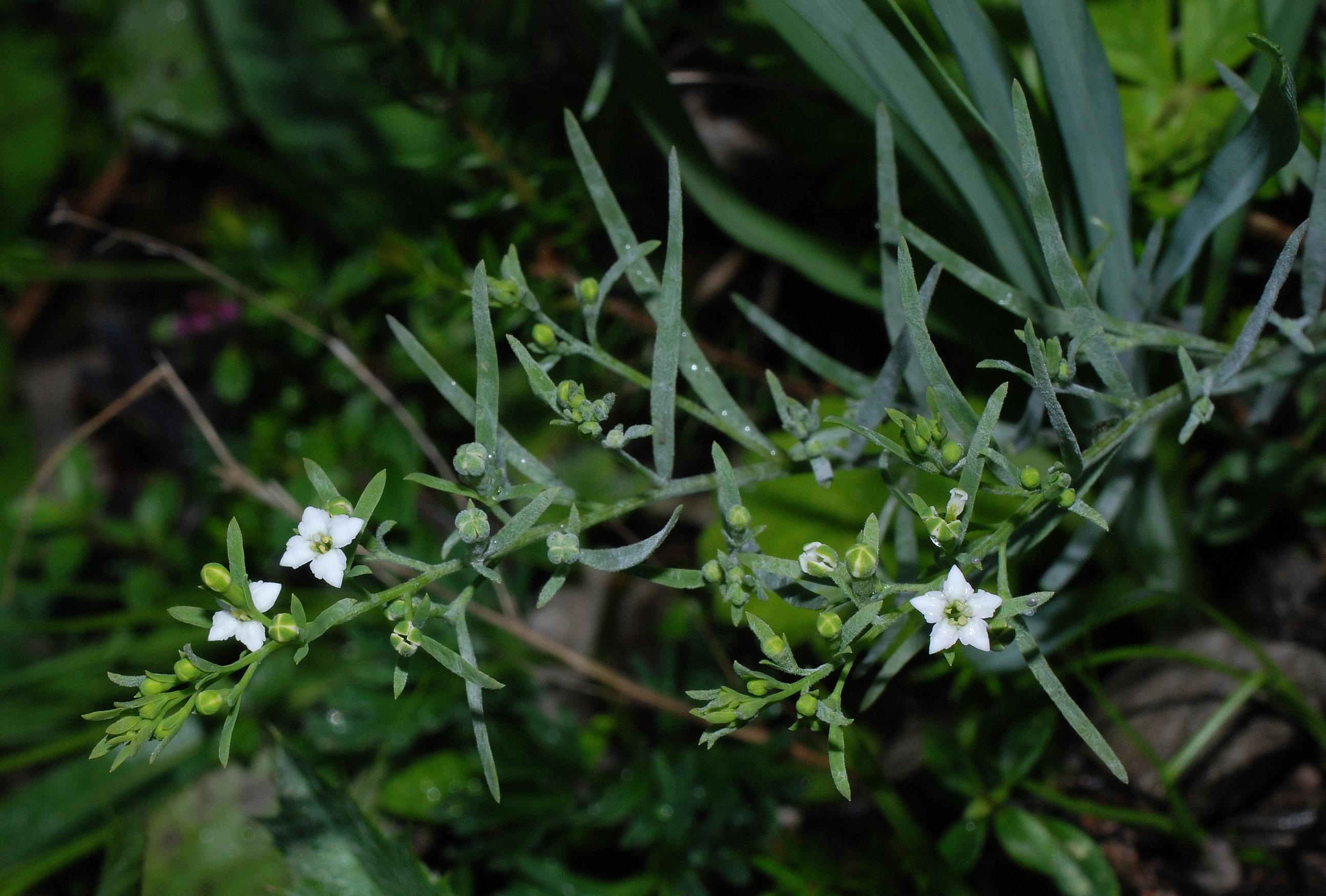
- Thesium alpinum

Scientific classification
- Kingdom: Plantae
- Clade: Embryophytes
- Clade: Tracheophytes
- Clade: Angiosperms
- Clade: Eudicots
- Order: Santalales
- Family: Santalaceae
- Genus: Thesium; L.

Synonyms
- Linophyllum Ség. (1754); Austroamericium Hendrych (1963); Chrysothesium (Jaub. & Spach) Hendrych (1993 publ. 1994); Frisca Spach (1841); Hagnothesium (DC.) Kuntze (1903); Kunkeliella Stearn (1972); Linosyris Ludw. (1757); Rhinostegia Turcz. (1843); Steinreitera Opiz (1852); Thesidium Sond. (1857); Thesion St.-Lag. (1880); Xerololophus Dulac (1867)

= Thesium =

Genus of flowering plants

Thesium is a genus of flowering plants in the family Santalaceae. It is particularly well represented in South Africa, where roughly half the species occur. Nickrent and others argue that the genera Austroamericium Hendrych, Chrysothesium (Jaub. & Spach) Hendrych, Kunkeliella Stearn, and Thesidium Sond should be considered as part of this genus.

Species in this genus are parasitic on roots. Fruits of Thesium species are nutlike achenes.

The following species are recognised by The Plant List:

- Thesium acuminatum A.W. Hill
- Thesium acutissimum A. DC.
- Thesium aellenianum Lawalrée
- Thesium affine Schltr.
- Thesium aggregatum A.W. Hill
- Thesium alatum Hilliard & B.L. Burtt
- Thesium albomontanum Compton
- Thesium alpinum L.
- Thesium amicorum Lawalrée
- Thesium andongense Hiern
- Thesium angolense Pilg.
- Thesium angulosum DC.
- Thesium annulatum A.W. Hill
- Thesium annuum Lawalrée
- Thesium aphyllum Mart. ex A. DC.
- Thesium archeri Compton
- Thesium arvense Horv.
- Thesium asperifolium A.W. Hill
- Thesium asterias A.W. Hill
- Thesium atrum A.W.Hill
- Thesium auriculatum Vandas
- Thesium australe R. Br.
- Thesium bangweolense R.E. Fr.
- Thesium bathyschistum Schltr.
- Thesium bavarum Schrank
- Thesium bequaertii Robyns & Lawalrée
- Thesium bergeri Zucc.
- Thesium boissierianum A. DC.
- Thesium bomiense C.Y. Wu ex D.D. Tao
- Thesium brachyanthum Baker
- Thesium brachygyne Schltr.
- Thesium brachyphyllum Boiss.
- Thesium brasiliense A. DC.
- Thesium brevibarbatum Pilg.
- Thesium brevibracteatum P.C. Tam
- Thesium breyeri N.E. Br.
- Thesium bundiense Hilliard
- Thesium burchellii A.W. Hill
- Thesium burkei A.W. Hill
- Thesium caespitosum Robyns & Lawalrée
- Thesium capitatum L.
- Thesium capitellatum A. DC.
- Thesium capituliflorum Sond.
- Thesium cathaicum Hendrych
- Thesium celatum N.E. Br.
- Thesium chimanimaniense Brenan
- Thesium chinense Turcz.
- Thesium cinereum A.W.Hill
- Thesium commutatum Sond.
- Thesium confine Sond.
- Thesium congestum R.A. Dyer
- Thesium conostylum Schltr.
- Thesium cordatum A.W. Hill
- Thesium coriarium A.W. Hill
- Thesium cornigerum A.W. Hill
- Thesium corsalpinum Hendrych
- Thesium crassipes Robyns & Lawalrée
- Thesium cupressoides A.W. Hill
- Thesium cymosum A.W. Hill
- Thesium cytisoides A.W. Hill
- Thesium davidsonae Brenan
- Thesium decaryanum Cavaco & Keraudren
- Thesium deceptum N.E. Br.
- Thesium decipiens Hilliard & B.L. Burtt
- Thesium densiflorum A. DC.
- Thesium densum N.E. Br.
- Thesium disciflorum A.W. Hill
- Thesium disparile N.E. Br.
- Thesium dissitiflorum Schltr.
- Thesium dissitum N.E. Br.
- Thesium divaricatum Jan ex Mert. & W.D.J.Koch
- Thesium diversifolium Sond.
- Thesium dolichomeres Brenen
- Thesium dollineri Murb. ex Velen.
- Thesium doloense Pilg.
- Thesium dumale N.E. Br.
- Thesium durum Hilliard & B.L. Burtt
- Thesium ebracteatum Hayne
- Thesium ecklonianum Sond.
- Thesium elatius Sond.
- Thesium emodi Hendrych
- Thesium equisetoides Welw. ex Hiern
- Thesium ericaefolium A. DC.
- Thesium euphorbioides L.
- Thesium euphrasioides A. DC.
- Thesium exile N.E. Br.
- Thesium fallax Schltr.
- Thesium fanshawei Hilliard
- Thesium fastigiatum A.W. Hill
- Thesium fenarium A.W. Hill
- Thesium filipes A.W.Hill
- Thesium fimbriatum A.W. Hill
- Thesium flexuosum A. DC.
- Thesium foliosum A. DC.
- Thesium fructicosum A.W. Hill
- Thesium fulvum A.W. Hill
- Thesium funale L.
- Thesium fuscum A.W.Hill
- Thesium galioides A. DC.
- Thesium germainii Robyns & Lawalrée
- Thesium glaucescens A.W. Hill
- Thesium glomeratum A.W. Hill
- Thesium glomeruliflorum Sond.
- Thesium goetzeanum Engl.
- Thesium gracilarioides A.W. Hill
- Thesium gracile A.W. Hill
- Thesium gracilentum N.E. Br.
- Thesium griseum Sond.
- Thesium gypsophiloides A.W. Hill
- Thesium hararensis A.G. Mill.
- Thesium helichrysoides A.W. Hill
- Thesium helodes Hilliard
- Thesium hillianum Compton
- Thesium himalense Royle
- Thesium hirsutum A.W. Hill
- Thesium hispanicum Hendrych
- Thesium hispidum Schlect.
- Thesium hockii Robyns & Lawalrée
- Thesium hollandii Compton
- Thesium hookeri Hendrych
- Thesium horridum Pilg.
- Thesium humbertii Cavaco & Keraudren
- Thesium humifusum DC.
- Thesium humile Vahl
- Thesium hystricoides A.W. Hill
- Thesium hystrix A.W. Hill
- Thesium imbricatum Thunb.
- Thesium impeditum A.W. Hill
- Thesium inhambanense Hilliard
- Thesium inonoense Hilliard
- Thesium inversum N.E. Br.
- Thesium italicum A.DC.
- Thesium jarmilae Hendrych
- Thesium jeanae Brenan
- Thesium juncifolium DC.
- Thesium junodii A.W. Hill
- Thesium karooicum Compton
- Thesium katangense Robyns & Lawalrée
- Thesium kernerianum Simonk.
- Thesium kilimandscharicum Engl.
- Thesium kyrnosum Hendrych
- Thesium lacinulatum A.W. Hill
- Thesium laetum Robyns & Lawalrée
- Thesium leandrianum Cavaco & Keraudren
- Thesium leptocaule Sond.
- Thesium lesliei N.E. Br.
- Thesium leucanthum Gilg
- Thesium lewallei Lawalrée
- Thesium libericum Hepper & Keay
- Thesium lineatum L. f.
- Thesium linophyllon L.
- Thesium linophyllum L.
- Thesium lisae-mariae Stauffer
- Thesium litoreum Brenan
- Thesium lobelioides A. DC.
- Thesium longiflorum Hand.-Mazz.
- Thesium longifolium Turcz.
- Thesium lopollense Hiern
- Thesium losowskii Lawalrée
- Thesium luembense Robyns & Lawalrée
- Thesium lycopodioides Gilg
- Thesium lynesii Robyns & Lawalrée
- Thesium macedonicum Hendrych
- Thesium macrogyne A.W. Hill
- Thesium macrostachyum A. DC.
- Thesium magalismontanum Sond.
- Thesium magnifructum Hilliard
- Thesium malaissei Lawalrée
- Thesium manikense Robyns & Lawalrée
- Thesium marlothii Schltr.
- Thesium masukense Baker ex A.W. Hill
- Thesium matteii Chiov.
- Thesium maximiliani Schltr.
- Thesium megalocarpum A.W.Hill
- Thesium microcephalum A.W. Hill
- Thesium micromeria A. DC.
- Thesium microphyllum Robyns & Lawalrée
- Thesium micropogon A. DC.
- Thesium mossii N.E. Br.
- Thesium mukense A.W. Hill
- Thesium multiramulosum Pilg.
- Thesium myriocladum Baker ex A.W. Hill
- Thesium namaquense Schltr.
- Thesium natalense Sond.
- Thesium nationae A.W. Hill
- Thesium nigricans Rendle
- Thesium nigromontanum Sond.
- Thesium nigrum A.W. Hill
- Thesium nudicaule A.W. Hill
- Thesium nutans Robyns & Lawalrée
- Thesium occidentale A.W. Hill
- Thesium oresigenum Compton
- Thesium orgadophilum P.C. Tam
- Thesium orientale A.W. Hill
- Thesium pallidum A. DC.
- Thesium palliolatum A.W. Hill
- Thesium paniculatum L.
- Thesium parnassi A.DC.
- Thesium paronychioides Sond.
- Thesium passerinoides Robyns & Lawalrée
- Thesium patersonae A.W. Hill
- Thesium patulum A.W. Hill
- Thesium pawlowskianum Lawalrée
- Thesium penicillatum A.W. Hill
- Thesium perrieri Cavaco & Keraudren
- Thesium phyllostachyum Sond.
- Thesium pilosum A.W.Hill
- Thesium pinifolium A. DC.
- Thesium pleuroloma A.W. Hill
- Thesium polycephalum Schltr.
- Thesium polygaloides A.W.Hill
- Thesium pottiae N.E. Br.
- Thesium procerum N.E. Br.
- Thesium procumbens C.A.Mey.
- Thesium prostratum A.W. Hill
- Thesium pseudocystoseiroides Cavaco & Keraudren
- Thesium pseudovirgatum Levyns
- Thesium psilotoides Hance
- Thesium pubescens A. DC.
- Thesium pungens A.W. Hill
- Thesium pycnanthum Schltr.
- Thesium pygmaeum Hilliard
- Thesium pyrenaicum Pourr.
- Thesium quarrei Robyns & Lawalrée
- Thesium quinqueflorum Sond.
- Thesium racemosum Bernh.
- Thesium radicans Hochst. ex A. Rich.
- Thesium ramosoides Hendrych
- Thesium rariflorum Sond.
- Thesium rasum N.E. Br.
- Thesium rectangulum Welw. ex Hiern
- Thesium reekmansii Lawalrée
- Thesium refractum C.A.Mey.
- Thesium remotebracteatum C.Y. Wu & D.D. Tao
- Thesium repandum A.W. Hill
- Thesium resedoides A.W.Hill
- Thesium resinifolium N.E. Br.
- Thesium rigidum Sond.
- Thesium robynsii Lawalrée
- Thesium rogersii A.W. Hill
- Thesium rostratum Mert. & W.D.J.Koch
- Thesium rufescens A.W. Hill
- Thesium saxatile Turcz. ex A. DC.
- Thesium scabridulum A.W. Hill
- Thesium scabrum L.
- Thesium scandens Sond.
- Thesium schaijesii Lawalrée
- Thesium schliebenii Pilg.
- Thesium schmitzii Robyns & Lawalrée
- Thesium schumannianum Schltr.
- Thesium schweinfurthii Engl.
- Thesium scirpioides A.W. Hill
- Thesium scoparium Peter
- Thesium sedifolium A. Dc. ex Levyns
- Thesium selagineum A. DC.
- Thesium semotum N.E. Br.
- Thesium sertulariastrum A.W. Hill
- Thesium setulosum Robyns & Lawalrée
- Thesium shabense Lawalrée
- Thesium singulare Hilliard
- Thesium sommieri Hendrych
- Thesium sonderianum Schltr.
- Thesium spartioides A.W. Hill
- Thesium sphaerocarpum Robyns & Lawalrée
- Thesium spicatum L.
- Thesium spinosum L. f.
- Thesium spinulosum A. DC.
- Thesium squarrosum L. f.
- Thesium strictum P.J. Bergius
- Thesium stuhlmannii Engl.
- Thesium subaphyllum Engl.
- Thesium subsimile N.E. Br.
- Thesium susannae A.W. Hill
- Thesium symoensii Lawalrée
- Thesium szowitsii A.DC.
- Thesium tamariscinum A.W. Hill
- Thesium tenuissimum Hook. f.
- Thesium tepuiense Steyerm.
- Thesium tetragonum A.W.Hill
- Thesium thamnus Robyns & Lawalrée
- Thesium tongolicum Hendrych
- Thesium translucens A.W. Hill
- Thesium transvaalense Schltr.
- Thesium triflorum Thunb. ex L. f.
- Thesium triste A.W.Hill
- Thesium ulugurense Engl.
- Thesium umbelliferum A.W. Hill
- Thesium unyikense Engl.
- Thesium urceolatum A.W. Hill
- Thesium urundiense Robyns & Lawalrée
- Thesium ussanguense Engl.
- Thesium utile A.W. Hill
- Thesium vahrmeijeri Brenan
- Thesium vimineum Robyns & Lawalrée
- Thesium virens A. DC.
- Thesium virgatum Lam.
- Thesium viride A.W.Hill
- Thesium viridifolium Levyns
- Thesium vlachorum Aldén
- Thesium welwitschii Hiern
- Thesium white-hillense Compton
- Thesium whyteanum Rendle
- Thesium wilczekianum Lawalrée
- Thesium xerophyticum A.W. Hill
- Thesium zeyheri A. DC.
