= Quarley =

Village and parish in Hampshire, England

Coordinates: 51.192893°N 1.60926°W

- Location within Hampshire
- Population: 150 (Census 2011)
- OS grid reference: SU2740243814
- District: Test Valley
- Shire county: Hampshire
- Region: South East
- Country: England
- Sovereign state: United Kingdom
- Post town: Andover
- Postcode district: SP11
- Dialling code: 01264
- Police: Hampshire and Isle of Wight
- Fire: Hampshire and Isle of Wight
- Ambulance: South Central
- UK Parliament: North West Hampshire

Quarley is a village and civil parish in the Test Valley district of Hampshire, England. It is about 7 mi (11 km) west of Andover and according to the 2001 census had a population of 161, reducing to 150 at the 2011 Census.

An Iron Age hillfort, Quarley Hill, lies immediately to the southwest.
