= Grateley =

Village and parish in Hampshire, England

Coordinates: 51.175517°N 1.604511°W

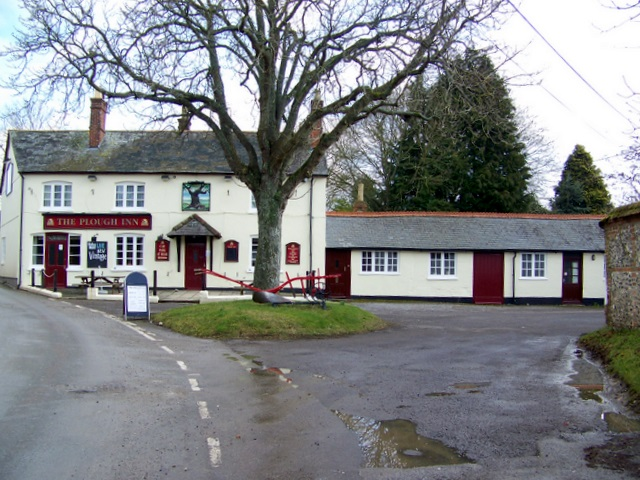
- The Plough Inn

- Location within Hampshire
- Population: 645 (2011 Census including Palestine, Hampshire)
- OS grid reference: SU2774441883
- District: Test Valley
- Shire county: Hampshire
- Region: South East
- Country: England
- Sovereign state: United Kingdom
- Post town: Andover
- Postcode district: SP11
- Dialling code: 01264
- Police: Hampshire and Isle of Wight
- Fire: Hampshire and Isle of Wight
- Ambulance: South Central
- UK Parliament: North West Hampshire

Grateley is a village, parish and civil parish in the Test Valley district, in north west of Hampshire, England. In 2021 the parish had a population of 662.

== Name ==
The name is derived from the Old English grēat lēah, meaning 'great wood or clearing'.

== Geography ==
The village is divided into two distinct settlements, 0.75 miles (1.21 km) apart: the old village and a newer settlement built around the railway station on the West of England Main Line. The hamlet of Palestine adjoins the railway station settlement, although it is located in the civil parish of Over Wallop.

== Pre-history ==
Grateley lies just to the south of the prehistoric hill fort of Quarley Hill. The parish covers 1,551 acres (6.28 km^{2}) with 616 people living in 250 dwellings.

== History ==
King Æthelstan issued his first official law code in Grateley in about 930 AD. Recorded in the early 12th century Quadripartitus text, which referred to a ‘great assembly at Grateley’ (magna synodo apud Greateleyam). The legislative assembly and construct of the Grateley law code acted as a manifestation of the peripatetic nature of Anglo-Saxon kingship.

In the 20th century Grateley was one of many ammunition dumps during the World Wars.

== Amenities and economy ==
The village has one pub, a thirteenth-century church dedicated to St Leonard, a primary school, a school for children with Asperger syndrome, a railway station, a small business park, a golf driving range, and is surrounded by farmland with ancient footpaths and droveways.

The economic history of Grateley is agricultural, but less than 10% of the village population now rely upon agriculture as an occupation.
