= Richard Hooker =

English bishop and Anglican Divine

The Reverend Richard Hooker
- Born: March 25, 1554; Heavitree, Exeter, Devon, England
- Died: 2 November 1600 (aged 46); Bishopsbourne, Kent, England
- Education: Corpus Christi College, Oxford
- Spouse: Jean Churchman

Ecclesiastical career
- Church: Church of England
- Ordained: 14 August 1579
- Offices held: Subdean, rector

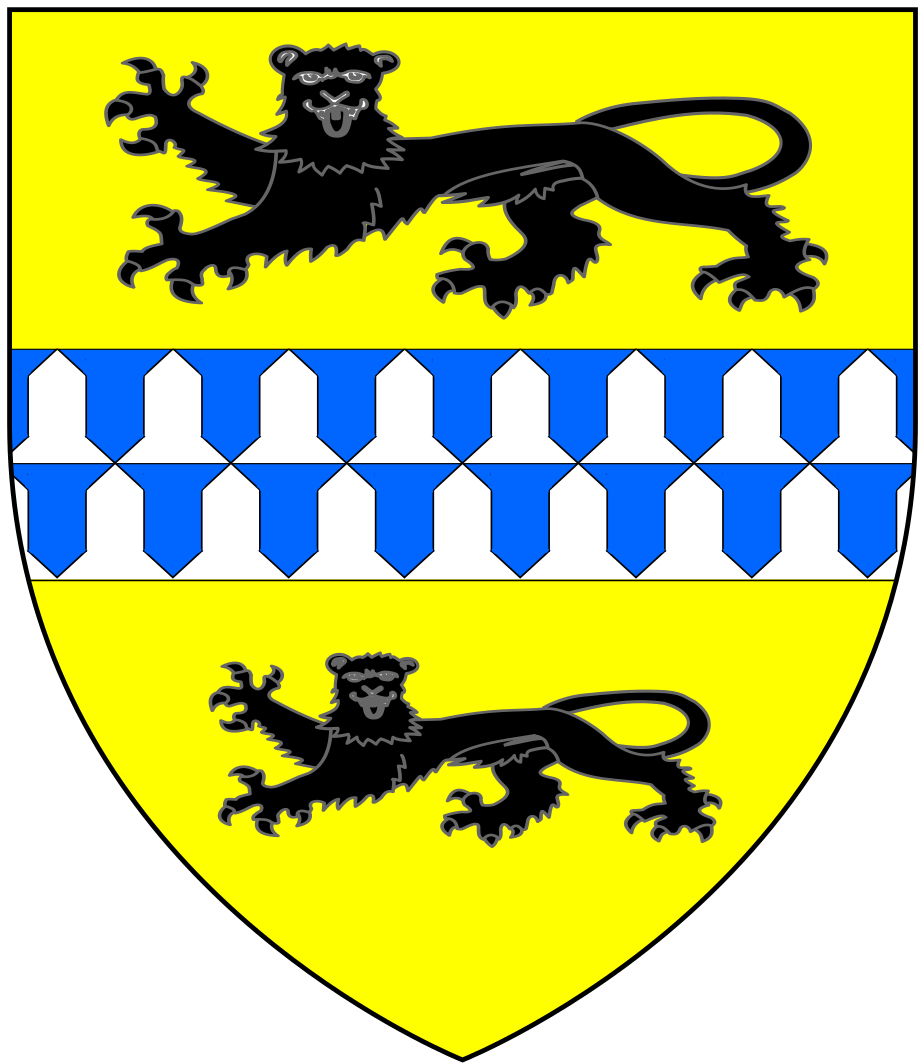
Arms of Hooker alias Vowell, of Exeter: Or, a fess vair between two lions passant guardant sable

Richard Hooker (25 March 1554 – 2 November 1600) was an English priest in the Church of England, Anglican divine, and an influential theologian. He was one of the most important English theologians of the sixteenth century. His defence of the role of redeemed reason informed the theology of the seventeenth-century Caroline Divines and later provided many members of the Church of England with a theological method which combined the claims of Revelation, reason and tradition.

Scholars disagree regarding Hooker's relationship with what would later be called "Anglicanism" and the Reformed theological tradition. Traditionally, he has been regarded as the originator of the Anglican via media between Protestantism and Catholicism. However, a growing number of scholars have argued that he should be considered as being in the mainstream Reformed theology of his time and that he sought only to oppose the extremists (Puritans), rather than moving the Church of England away from Protestantism. The term "Anglican" is not found in his writings and indeed first appears early in the reign of Charles I as the Church of England moved towards an Arminian position doctrinally and a more "Catholic" look liturgically under the leadership of Archbishop William Laud.

== Youth (1554–1581) ==
Details of Hooker's life come chiefly from Izaak Walton's biography of him. Hooker was born in the village of Heavitree in Exeter, Devon sometime around Easter Sunday (March) 1554. He attended Exeter Grammar School until 1569. Richard came from a good family, but one that was neither noble nor wealthy. His uncle John Hooker was a success and served as the chamberlain of Exeter.

Hooker's uncle was able to obtain for Richard the help of another Devon native, John Jewel, bishop of Salisbury. The bishop saw to it that Richard was accepted to Corpus Christi College, Oxford, where he became a fellow of the society in 1577. In addition to his assistance securing admittance, Jewel also agreed to fund Hooker's education. On 14 August 1579 Hooker was ordained a priest by Edwin Sandys, then bishop of London. Sandys made Hooker tutor to his son Edwin, and Richard also taught George Cranmer, the great nephew of Archbishop Thomas Cranmer. In 1580 he was deprived of his fellowship for "contentiousness" having campaigned for the losing candidate (John Rainolds, a lifelong friend who would become a leader of the Puritan party and participate in the Hampton Court Conference of 1604) in a contested election to the presidency of the college. However, he recovered it when Rainolds finally assumed the post".

== London and marriage (1581–1595) ==
In 1581, Hooker was appointed to preach at St Paul's Cross and he became a public figure, more so because his sermon offended the Puritans by diverging from their theories of predestination. Some ten years before Hooker arrived in London, the Puritans had produced an "Admonition to Parliament" together with "A view of Popish Abuses" and initiated a long debate which would last beyond the end of the century. John Whitgift (soon to become Archbishop of Canterbury) produced a reply, and Thomas Cartwright a reaction to the reply. Hooker was drawn into the debate through the influence of Edwin Sandys and George Cranmer.

He was also introduced to John Churchman, a distinguished London merchant who became Master of the Merchant Taylors' Company. It was at this time, according to his first biographer Walton, that Hooker made the "fatal mistake" of marrying his landlady's daughter, Jean Churchman. As Walton put it: "There is a wheel within a wheel; a secret sacred wheel of Providence (most visible in marriages), guided by His hand that allows not the race to the swift nor bread to the wise, nor good wives to good men: and He that can bring good out of evil (for mortals are blind to this reason) only knows why this blessing was denied to patient Job, to meek Moses, and to our as meek and patient Mr Hooker." However, Walton is described by Christopher Morris as an "unreliable gossip" who "generally moulded his subjects to fit a ready-made pattern", and both he and John Booty give the date of the marriage as 1588. Hooker seems to have lived on and off with the Churchmans until 1595 and, according to Booty, he "seems to have been well treated and considerably assisted by John Churchman and his wife".

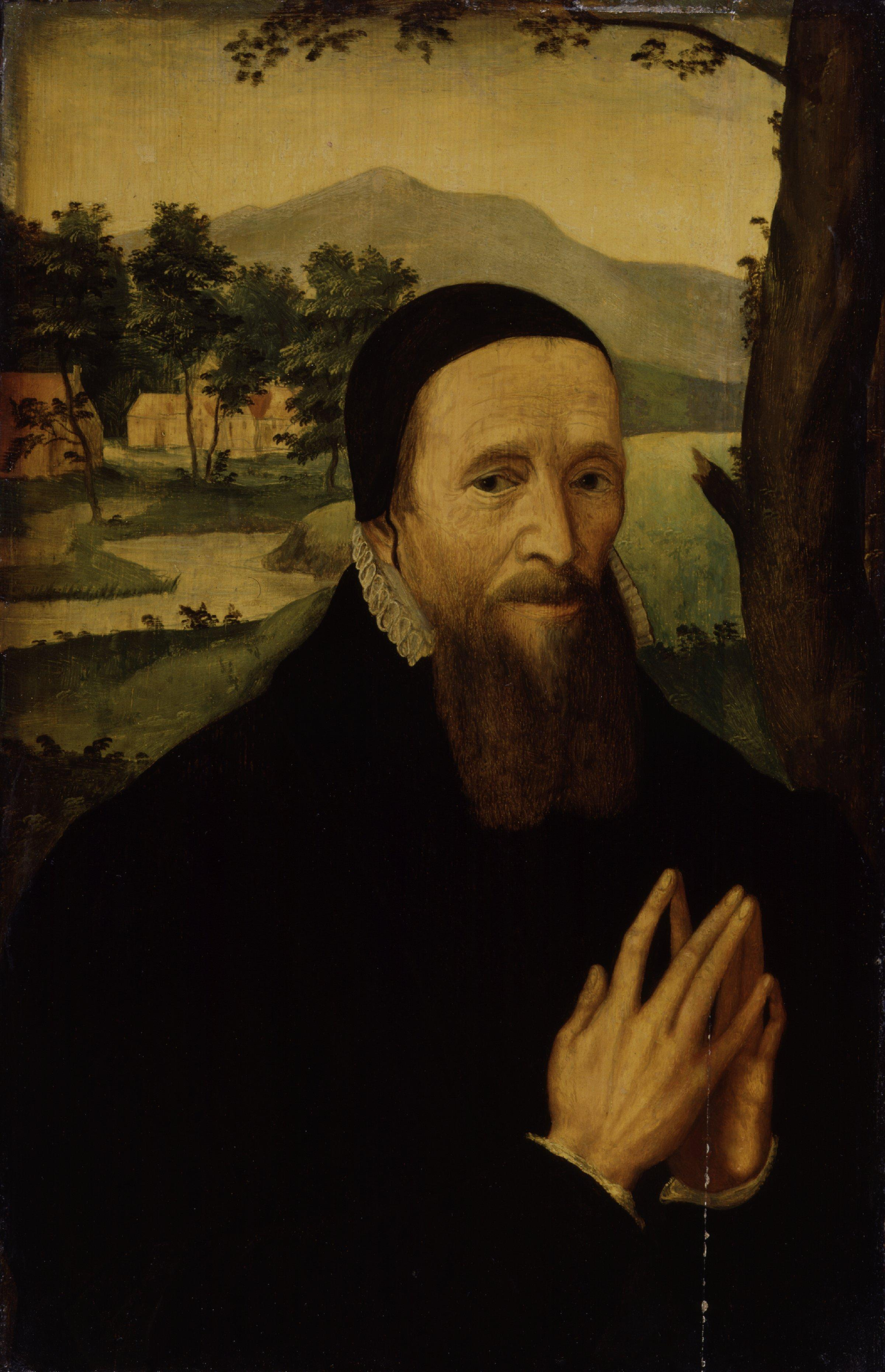
Portrait of an unknown man, formerly thought to be Richard Hooker

Hooker became rector of St. Mary's, Drayton Beauchamp, Buckinghamshire, in 1584, but probably never lived there. The following year, he was appointed Master of the Temple in London by the Queen (possibly as a compromise candidate to those proposed by Lord Burleigh and Whitgift). There, Hooker soon came into public conflict with Walter Travers, a leading Puritan and Reader (lecturer) at the Temple, partly because of the sermon at Paul's Cross four years before, but mainly because Hooker argued that salvation was possible for some Roman Catholics. The controversy abruptly ended when Travers was silenced by the Archbishop in March 1586 and the Privy Council strongly supported the decision.

About this time, Hooker began to write his major work Of the Laws of Ecclesiastical Polity, a critique of the Puritans and their attacks on the Church of England and particularly the Book of Common Prayer.

In 1591, Hooker left the Temple and was presented to the living of St Andrew's, Boscombe, Wiltshire to support him while he wrote. He seems to have lived mainly in London but apparently did spend time in Salisbury where he was subdean of Salisbury Cathedral and made use of the Cathedral Library. The first four volumes of the major work were published in 1593, with a subsidy from Edwin Sandys, and apparently the last four were held back for further revision by the author.

== Last years (1595–1600) ==
In 1595, Hooker became rector of the parishes of St. Mary the Virgin in Bishopsbourne and St. John the Baptist in Barham, both in Kent, and left London to continue his writing. He published the fifth book of the Laws in 1597. It is longer than the first four taken together. He died on 3 November 1600 at his rectory in Bishopsbourne and was buried in the chancel of the church, being survived by his wife and four daughters. His will includes the following provision: "Item, I give and bequeth three pounds of lawful English money towards the building and making of a newer and sufficient pulpitt in the p'sh of Bishopsbourne." The pulpit can still be seen in Bishopsbourne church, along with a statue of him. Subsequently, a monument was erected there by William Cowper in 1632 which described him as "judicious".

== Works ==
Apart from the Laws, Hooker's lesser writings, which are few in number, fall into three groups: those related to the Temple Controversy with Travers (including three sermons); those connected with the last writing of the last books of the Laws; and other miscellaneous sermons (four complete plus three fragments).

=== Learned Discourse of Justification ===
This sermon from 1585 was one of those that triggered Travers' attack and appeal to the Privy Council. Travers accused Hooker of preaching doctrine favourable to the Church of Rome when in fact he had just described their differences, emphasising that Rome attributed to works "a power of satisfying God for sin". For Hooker, works were a necessary expression of thanksgiving for unmerited justification by a merciful God. Hooker defended his belief in the doctrine of justification by faith, but argued that even those who did not understand or accept this could be saved by God.

Hooker also expresses in this work the classic ordo salutis that recognises the distinction between justification and sanctification as two forms of righteousness while at the same time emphasising the role the sacraments have in justification. Hooker's approach to this topic is seen as a classic example of the Anglican via media.

=== Of the Laws of Ecclesiastical Polity ===
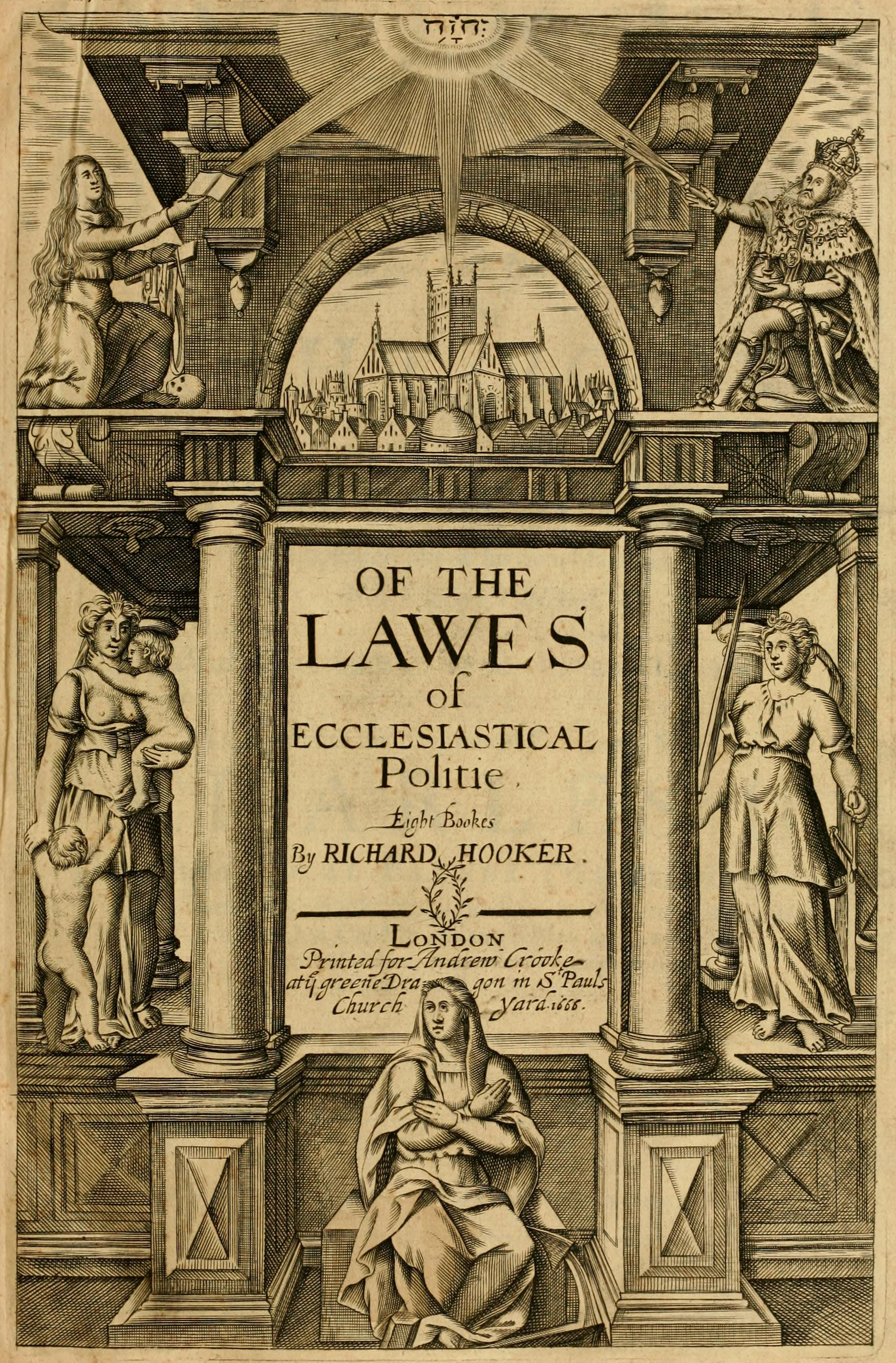
Title page of 1666 edition Of the Lawes of Ecclesiastical Politie

Of the Laws of Ecclesiastical Polity (original spelling, Of the Lawes of Ecclesiastical Politie) is Hooker's best-known work, with the first four books being published in 1594. The fifth book was published in 1597, while the final three were published posthumously, and indeed may not all be his own work. Structurally, the work is a carefully worked out reply to the general principles of Puritanism as found in the "Admonition" and Thomas Cartwright's follow-up writings, more specifically:

1. Scripture alone is the rule that should govern all human conduct;
2. Scripture prescribes an unalterable form of Church government;
3. The English Church is corrupted by Roman Catholic orders, rites, and ceremonies;
4. The law is corrupt in not allowing lay elders;
5. "There ought not to be in the Church Bishops".

The Laws has been characterised as "probably the first great work of philosophy and theology to be written in English". The book is far more than a negative rebuttal of the puritan claims: it is "a continuous and coherent whole presenting a philosophy and theology congenial to the Anglican Book of Common Prayer and the traditional aspects of the Elizabethan Settlement".

Quoting C. S. Lewis, Stephen Neill underlines its positive side in the following terms: hitherto, in England, "controversy had involved only tactics; Hooker added strategy. Long before the close fighting in Book III begins, the puritan position has been rendered desperate by the great flanking movements in Books I and II. ... Thus the refutation of the enemy comes in the end to seem a very small thing, a by-product."

It is a massive work that deals mainly with the proper governance of the churches ("polity"). The Puritans advocated the demotion of clergy and ecclesiasticism. Hooker attempted to work out which methods of organising churches are best. What was at stake behind the theology was the position of Queen Elizabeth I as the Supreme Governor of the Church. If doctrine were not to be settled by authorities, and if Martin Luther's argument for the priesthood of all believers were to be followed to its extreme with government by the Elect, then having the monarch as the governor of the church was intolerable. On the other side, if the monarch were appointed by God to be the governor of the church, then local parishes going their own ways on doctrine were similarly intolerable.

In political philosophy, Hooker is best remembered for his account of law and the origins of government in Book One of the Laws. Drawing heavily on the legal thought of Thomas Aquinas, Hooker distinguishes seven forms of law: eternal law ("that which God hath eternally purposed himself in all his works to observe"), celestial law (God's law for the angels), nature's law (that part of God's eternal law that governs natural objects), the law of reason (dictates of Right Reason that normatively govern human conduct), human positive law (rules made by human lawmakers for the ordering of a civil society), divine law (rules laid down by God that can be known only by special revelation), and ecclesiastical law (rules for the governance of a church). Like Aristotle, whom he frequently quotes, Hooker believes that humans are naturally inclined to live in society. Governments, he claims, are based on both this natural social instinct and on the express or implied consent of the governed.

The Laws is remembered not only for its stature as a monumental work of Anglican thought, but also for its influence in the development of theology, political theory, and English prose.

==== Scholastic thought in a latitudinarian manner ====
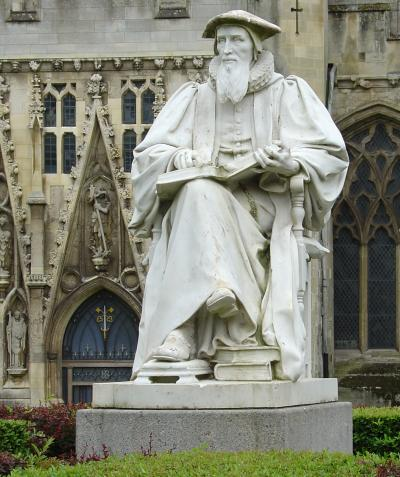
Statue of Hooker in front of Exeter Cathedral

Hooker worked largely from Thomas Aquinas, but he adapted scholastic thought in a latitudinarian manner. He argued that church organisation, like political organisation, is one of the "things indifferent" to God. He wrote that minor doctrinal issues were not issues that damned or saved the soul, but rather frameworks surrounding the moral and religious life of the believer. He contended there were good monarchies and bad ones, good democracies and bad ones, and good church hierarchies and bad ones: what mattered was the piety of the people. At the same time, Hooker argued that authority was commanded by the Bible and by the traditions of the early church, but authority was something that had to be based on piety and reason rather than automatic investiture. This was because authority had to be obeyed even if it were wrong and needed to be remedied by right reason and the Holy Spirit. Notably, Hooker affirmed that the power and propriety of bishops need not be in every case absolute.

== Legacy ==
King James I is quoted by Izaak Walton, Hooker's biographer, as saying, "I observe there is in Mr. Hooker no affected language; but a grave, comprehensive, clear manifestation of reason, and that backed with the authority of the Scriptures, the fathers and schoolmen, and with all law both sacred and civil." Hooker's emphasis on Scripture, reason, and tradition considerably influenced the development of Anglicanism, as well as many political philosophers, including John Locke. Locke quotes Hooker numerous times in the Second Treatise of Civil Government and was greatly influenced by Hooker's natural-law ethics and his staunch defence of human reason (though Locke's use of Hooker is selective and limited). As Frederick Copleston notes, Hooker's moderation and civil style of argument were remarkable in the religious atmosphere of his time. In the Church of England he is celebrated with a lesser festival on 3 November and the same day is also observed in the calendars of other parts of the Anglican Communion.

== See also ==
- High church
- Low church
- Broad church
- Central churchmanship
- Anglican doctrine
