= Janson (disambiguation) =

Janson is a group of serif typefaces.

Janson may also refer to:

- Janson (name), a surname and uncommon given name
- Janson Design Group, an American acoustic and audiovisual architectural design firm
- Janson metro station, a railway station in Charleroi, Belgium
- Lycée Janson de Sailly, a school in Paris, France
- Saint-Estève-Janson, a commune in Bouches-du-Rhône, France

== See also ==
- Jansen (disambiguation)
- Jansons (surname)
- Janssen (disambiguation)
- Janssens, a surname
- Jansson, a surname
- Jensen (disambiguation)
- Jenson (disambiguation)
