= Jenssen =

Origin
- Origin: Denmark
- Meaning: "son of Jens"
- Region of origin: Norway

Other names
- Variant forms: Janson, Jensen, Jenson

Jenssen is a Norwegian patronymic surname meaning "son of Jens". The prefix "Jens-" is a Danish and Frisian derivative of Johannes. There are alternate spellings, including the Danish Jensen, the English language Jenson, and the Belgian/Dutch language Janson. Jenssen is uncommon as a given name. People with the name Jenssen include:

- Amanda Jenssen (born 1988), Swedish singer
- Elois Jenssen (1922–2004), American film and television costume designer
- Geir Jenssen, Norwegian musician best known under the recording name Biosphere
- Hans Jørgen Darre-Jenssen (1864–1950), Norwegian politician
- Hans Wiers-Jenssen (1866–1925), Norwegian novelist
- Heine Jenssen, Norwegian footballer
- Håvar Jenssen, Norwegian footballer
- Jens Martin Arctander Jenssen (1885–1968), Norwegian politician
- Jens Peter Book-Jenssen (1910–1999), Norwegian singer
- Johan Henrik Wiers-Jenssen (1897–1951), Norwegian newspaper columnist
- Lauritz Jenssen (1837–1899), Norwegian businessperson and politician
- Lauritz Dorenfeldt Jenssen (1801–1859), Norwegian businessperson
- Leif Jenssen, Norwegian weightlifter
- Lene Jenssen, Norwegian swimmer
- Matz Jenssen (1760–1813), Norwegian businessperson
- Ruben Yttergård Jenssen, Norwegian footballer
- Ulrik Yttergård Jenssen, Norwegian footballer
- Worm Hirsch Darre-Jenssen (1870–1945), Norwegian politician

== See also ==
- Jens (disambiguation)
- Jensen (disambiguation)
- Jenson (disambiguation)
- Janson (disambiguation)
