= Jansson =

Jansson is a Swedish patronymic surname, meaning "son of Jan", derived from Johannes, a cognate of John. There are alternate Belgian, German, Dutch, Danish, Latvian and Norwegian spellings. Jansson is rare as a given name. Notable people with the name include:

== Surname ==
Jansson
Origin
- Origin: Scandinavian
- Meaning: "son of Jan"

Other names
- Variant forms: Janson, Jenson, Jansons/Jansone

- Amanda Jansson (born 1990), Swedish actress
- Ann Jansson (footballer) (born 1957), Swedish association football player
- AnnMari Jansson (1934–2007), Swedish systems ecologist
- Augusta Jansson (1859–1932), Swedish entrepreneur
- Bengt Jansson (born 1943), former Swedish international speedway rider
- Börje Jansson (born 1942), Swedish chess player
- Camilla Sköld Jansson (born 1957), Swedish politician
- Daniel Jansson (born 1979), Finnish basketball coach and a former player
- Emma Jansson (born 1996), Swedish footballer
- Erik Jansson (1808–1850), leader of a Swedish pietist sect that emigrated to the United States in 1846
- Erik Jansson (cyclist) (1907–1993), Swedish, Olympic road racing cyclist
- Folke Jansson (1897–1965), Swedish, Olympics triple jump
- Gustaf Jansson (1922–2012), Swedish, Olympic marathoner
- Helena Jansson (born 1985), Swedish orienteer
- Herold Jansson (1899–1965), Danish, Olympic gymnast and diver
- Jan-Magnus Jansson (1922–2003), Finnish politician
- Jan Janssonius (1588–1664), also known as Jan Jansson, Dutch cartographer
- Jan Jansson (footballer) (born 1968), Swedish
- Jesper Jansson (born 1971), Swedish football player
- Jimmy Jansson (born 1985), Swedish singer and songwriter
- Jimmy Jansson (politician) (born 1978), Swedish politician
- John Jansson (1892–1943), Swedish, Olympic diver
- Karl Emanuel Jansson (1846–1874), Finnish artist
- Kjell Jansson (born 1959), Swedish politician
- Lars Jansson (composer), (born 1951), Swedish composer
- Ludvig Jansson (born 2003), Swedish ice hockey player
- Marlena Jansson (born 1970), Swedish orienteering competitor
- Mats Jansson (born 1951), Swedish, Chief Executive Officer of SAS Group
- Mikael Jansson (politician) (born 1965), Swedish politician
- Nanna Jansson (born 1983), Swedish, Olympic ice hockey medalist
- Pontus Jansson (born 1991), Swedish footballer
- Rasmus Jansson (born 1997), Finnish football coach
- Roger Jansson (born 1943), Finnish politician
- Rony Jansson (born 2004), Finnish professional footballer
- Sven B. F. Jansson (1906–1987), Swedish linguist
- Sven-Åke Jansson (1937–2014), Swedish Army lieutenant general
- Tommy Jansson (1952–1976), Swedish motorcycle speedway rider
- Tove Jansson (1914–2001), Finnish novelist, painter, illustrator and comic strip author
- Ulrik Jansson (born 1968), former Swedish footballer
- Viktor Jansson (1886–1958), Finnish sculptor

== Given name ==
- Jansson Stegner (born 1972), American artist
