= Karl Bulla =

German-Russian photographer (1853/1855–1929)

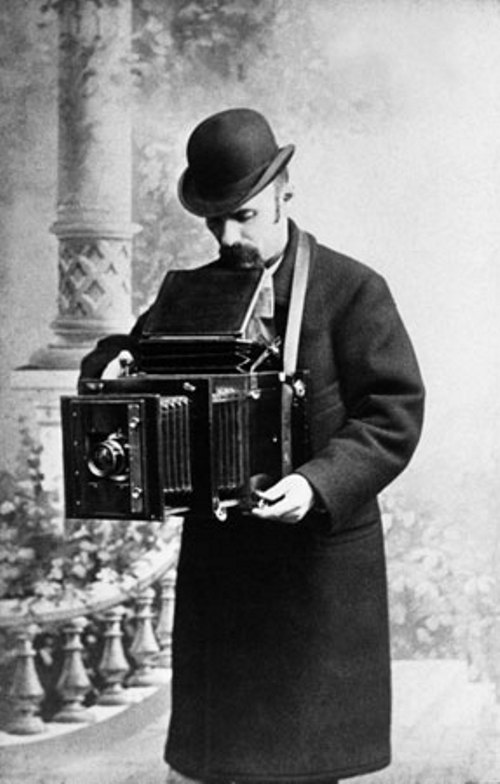
Self-portrait, before 1917

Carl Oswald Bulla or Karl Karlovich Bulla (Russian: Карл Карлович Булла; 26 February 1855 or 1853 – 28 November 1929) was a German-Russian photographer, often referred to as the "father of Russian photo-reporting".

== Biography ==
Carl Oswald Bulla was born in Leobschütz in Prussia (now Głubczyce, Poland). His exact birth year is unclear with some references citing 1853 then others citing 1855. In 1865 the adventurous boy ran away from his family to St. Petersburg, Russian Empire. The reasons prompting the boy to choose Russia out of all possible destinations are unknown.

After arriving in St. Petersburg, Bulla started to work as a delivery-boy in the firm Dupant that made and sold photography supplies. Soon his responsibilities included handmaking (coating and sensitizing) of the photographic glass negative plates. At the age of twenty Bulla opened a small factory producing "momentary dry bromine-gelatin plates". Buying the readymade photographic materials was much more convenient than handmaking their own and soon Bulla's plates became popular, selling not only in St.Petersburg but across the whole Russian Empire. In February 1876 Bulla requested his naturalization and in July 1876 became a subject of the Russian Empire.

In 1875 Bulla opened his first photographic studio at 61 Sadovaya Street and soon became a fashionable photographer. For ten years he worked there doing pavilion portrait photography. Then in 1886, he received the permit from the St.Petersburg Police allowing him to take pictures everywhere. While he did not abandon studio photography (in fact he opened two more studios: on the Catherine Canal and on Nevsky Prospekt) but became more interested in photography of city life.

At the end of the 19th century, newspaper printing technology allowed the publishing of photographs. In 1894 Russian Department of Post and Telegraphs also allowed the use of postcards. Both events significantly increased the demand for photographs. In 1895 Bulla stopped his production of photographic supplies and put all his energy into photography. In his advertisement, he wrote "The oldest photographer-illustrator Karl Bulla photographs for the illustrated magazines anything and anywhere without limits from the landscape or the building, indoor or outdoor day or night at the artificial light".

Indeed, he photographed everything and anything: Life of Tsar family and assemblies of anti-government intelligentsia, stars of scene and manual workers, palaces and hostels for homeless, even such exotics as gay parties. Bulla was on the editorial board of many magazines including popular Niva. In 1910s the annual revenue of the firm "Bulla and Sons" reached 250 thousand roubles.

In 1916 Bulla passed the management of the firm "Bulla and sons" to his sons Alexander and Viktor and moved to Ösel Island (currently Saaremaa, Estonia). He lived a quiet life there, photographing the local ethnographic material and teaching Estonian boys the basics of photography until his death in 1929.

== The sons ==
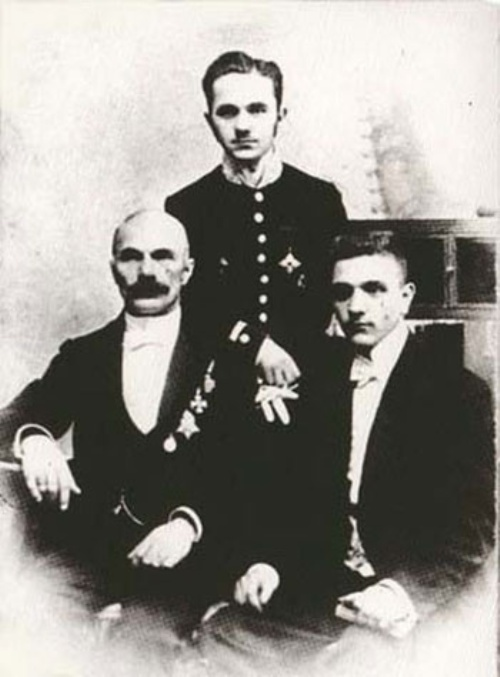
Karl Bulla and his sons, 1910

After the retirement of Karl Bulla, his firm was managed by his sons, Alexander and Viktor. Viktor Bulla was a notable photo-reporter in his own right. He was the author of a series on the Russo-Japanese War and World War I. At that time, before the invention of the telephoto lens, photography was a very difficult and dangerous mission.

Later Viktor Bulla made photographs of the October Revolution and the Russian Civil War. He was appointed the Chief Photographer of the Leningrad Soviet. He took a lot of photographs of Vladimir Lenin and other bolsheviks. In 1938 during the Great Purge he was arrested, accused of being a German spy and shot.

The life of Alexander Bulla also ended tragically. He was arrested in the early 1930s and sent to White Sea – Baltic Canal labor camps. He returned after five years and soon died.

== Archive ==
In 1935 the son of Karl, Viktor Bulla donated to the State Archive of Leningrad District 132,683 negatives of Bulla's photographs. The archive grew and now consists of more than 200,000 negatives of works by Karl Bulla and his sons. All the photographs in the archive are in the public domain and are a favorite source of illustrations of life in Saint-Petersburg.

In 2003 there was a large exhibition of Bulla's prints celebrating 300 years of Saint-Petersburg and 150th birthday of Karl Bulla (by the 1853 version). People of Saint-Petersburg put a bronze sculpture of Karl Bulla on Malaya Sadovaya Street near the former studio of Karl Bulla. The sculpture shows a photographer with an ancient camera and an umbrella photographing a bulldog.

== Selected works ==
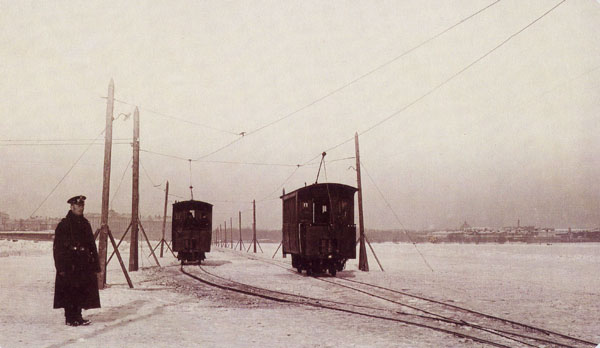
Trams on the frozen Neva River

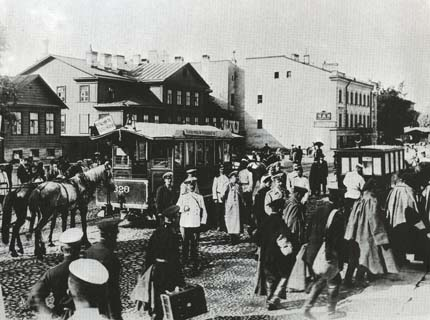
Street scene

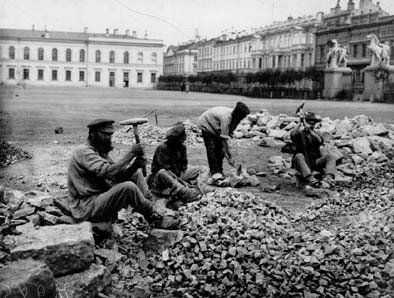
Stonemasons, 1900s

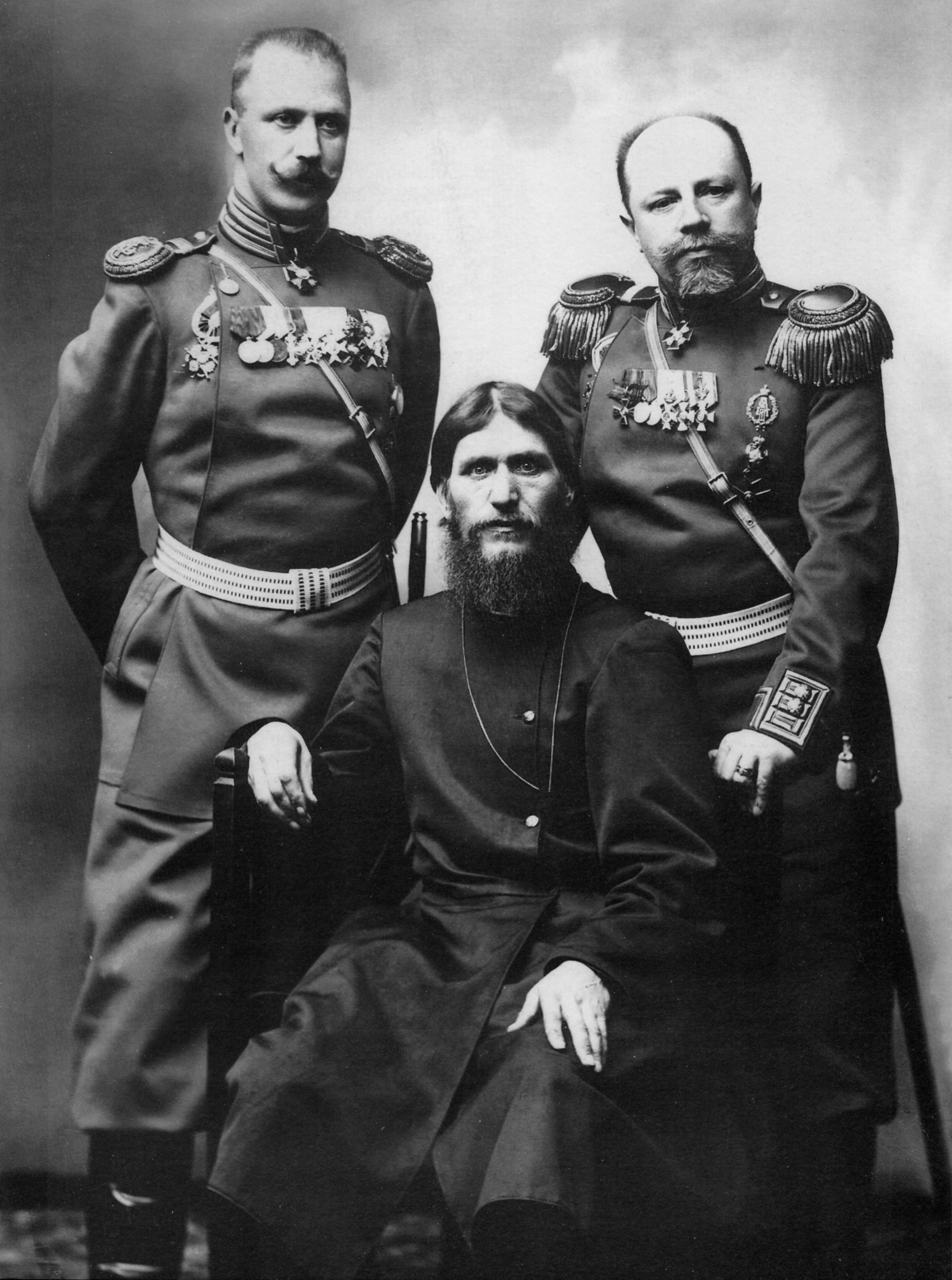
Grigory Rasputin, Major-General Putyatin and Colonel Lotman, 1904

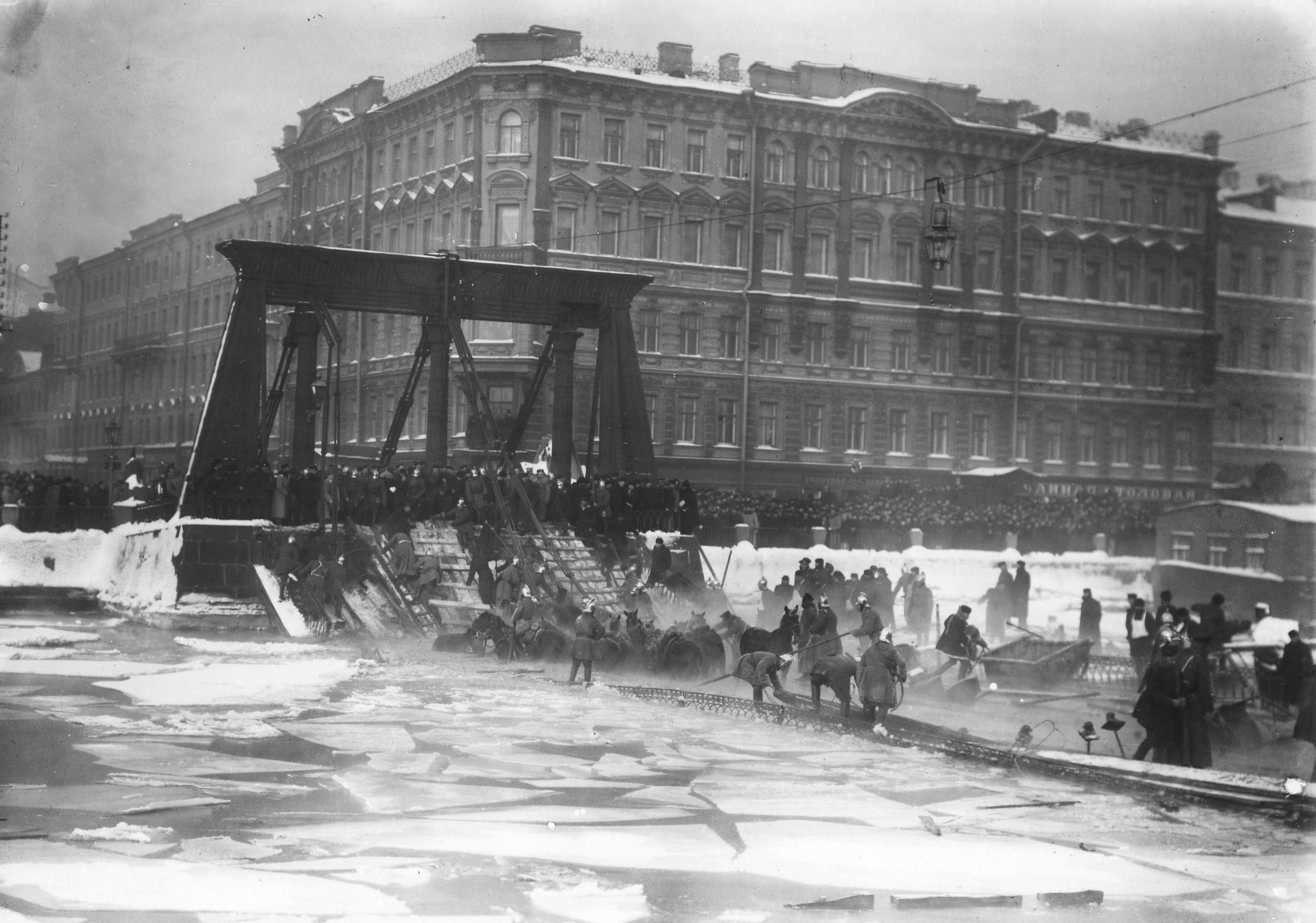
Collapse of the Egyptian Bridge

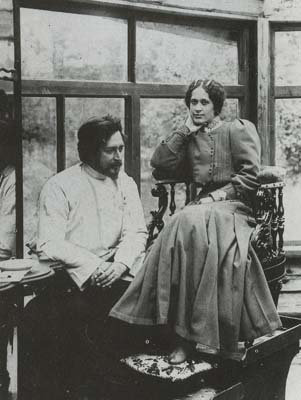
Leonid Andreyev and his wife, Anna

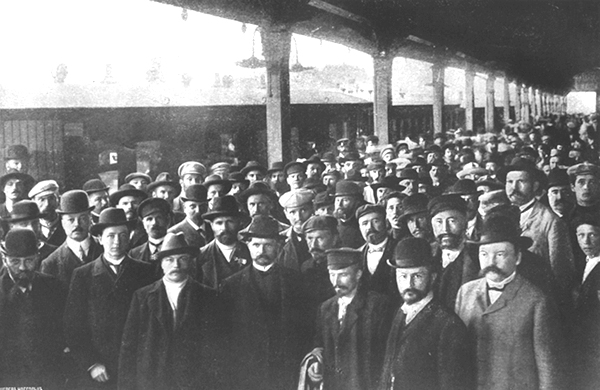
Deputies of the disbanded State Duma arrive to Vyborg to sign an anti-government Vyborg Manifesto, 1906

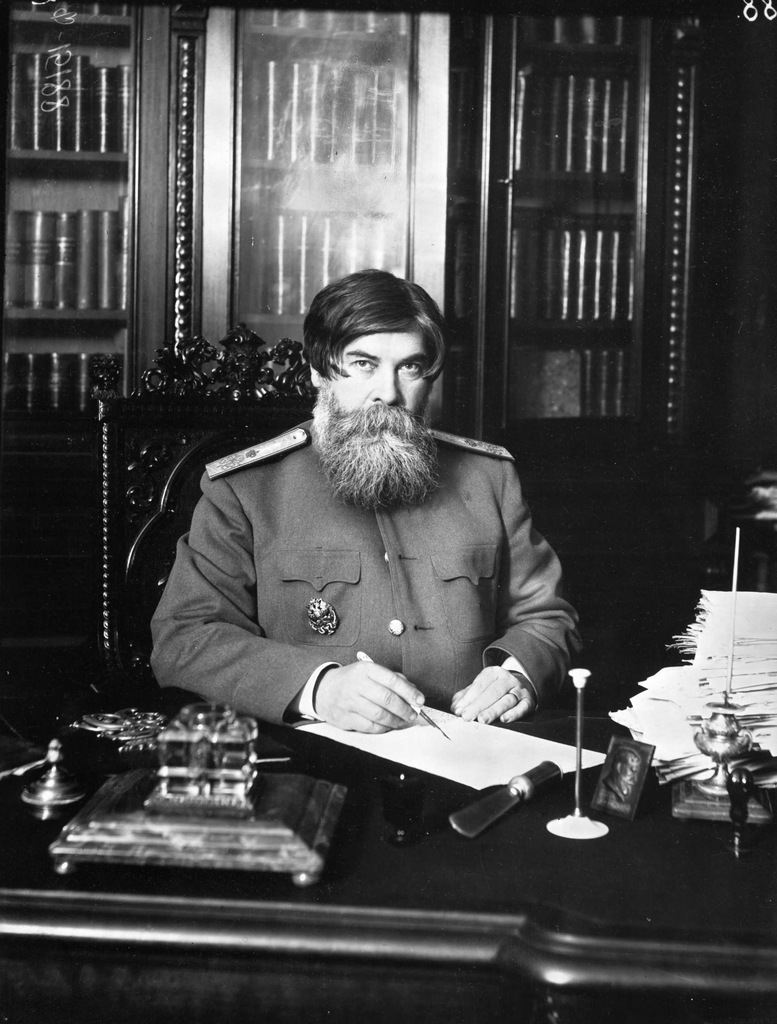
Vladimir Bekhterev

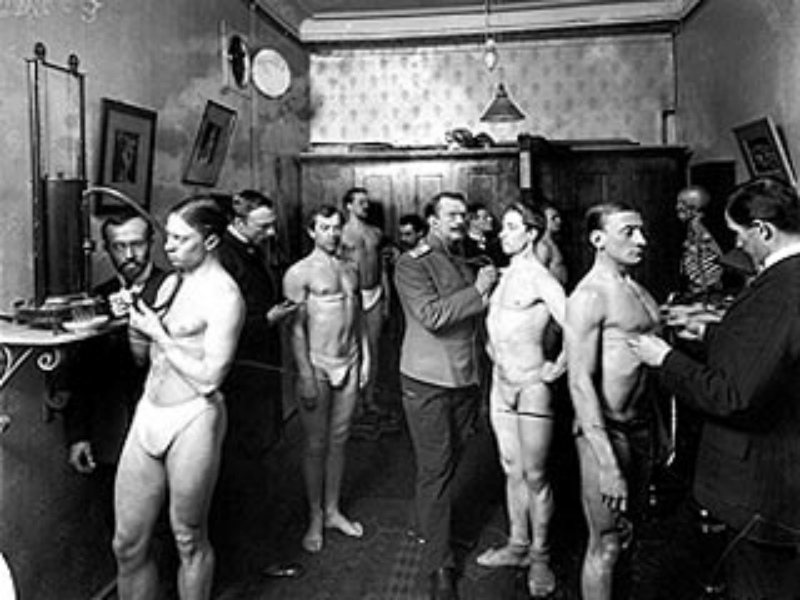
1900s

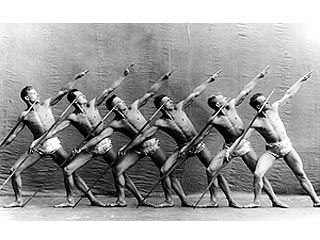
1900s

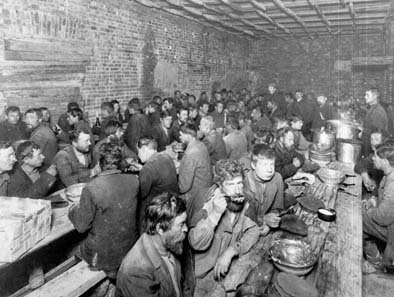
Homeless Shelter, 1910

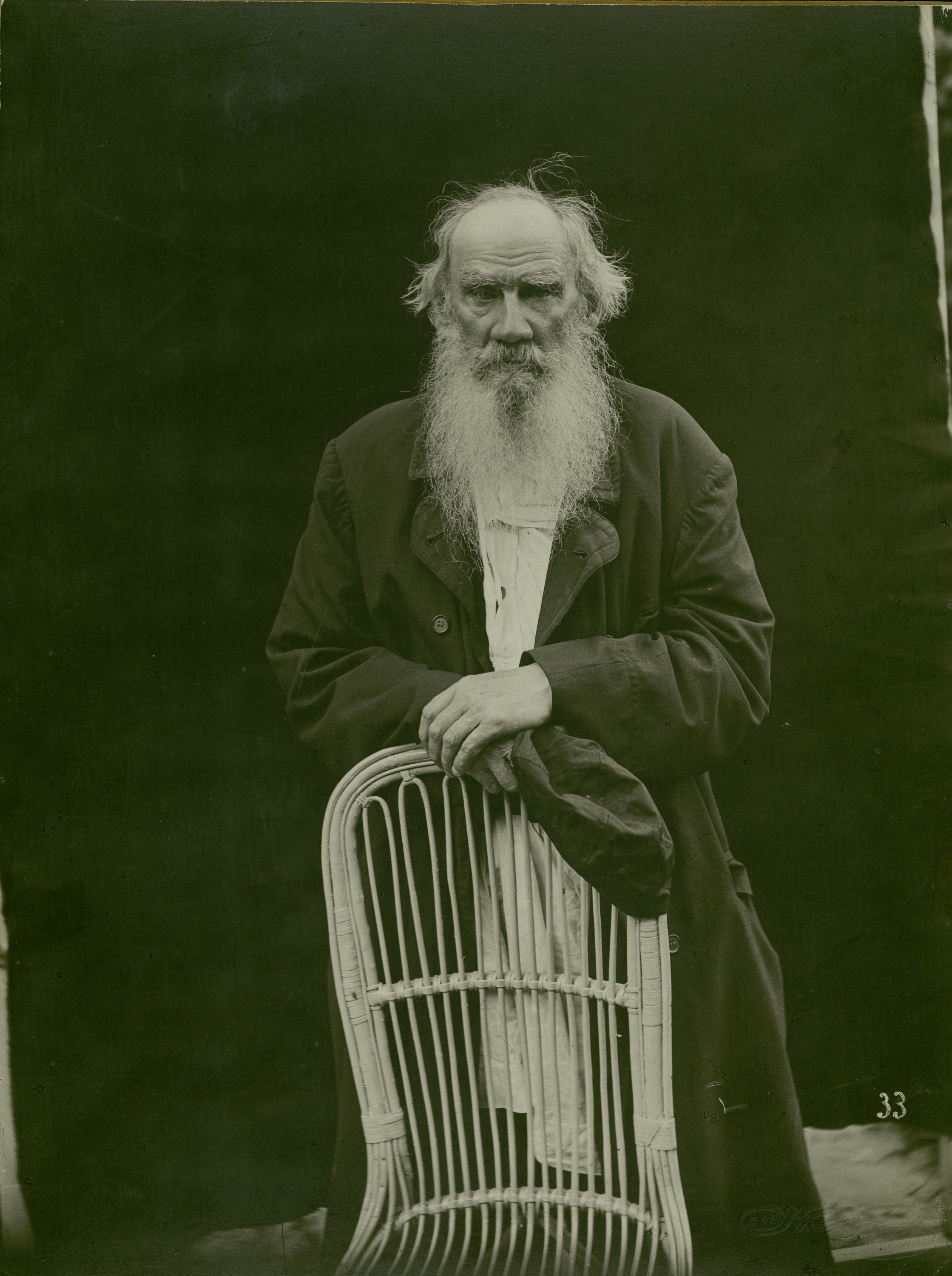
Leo Tolstoy

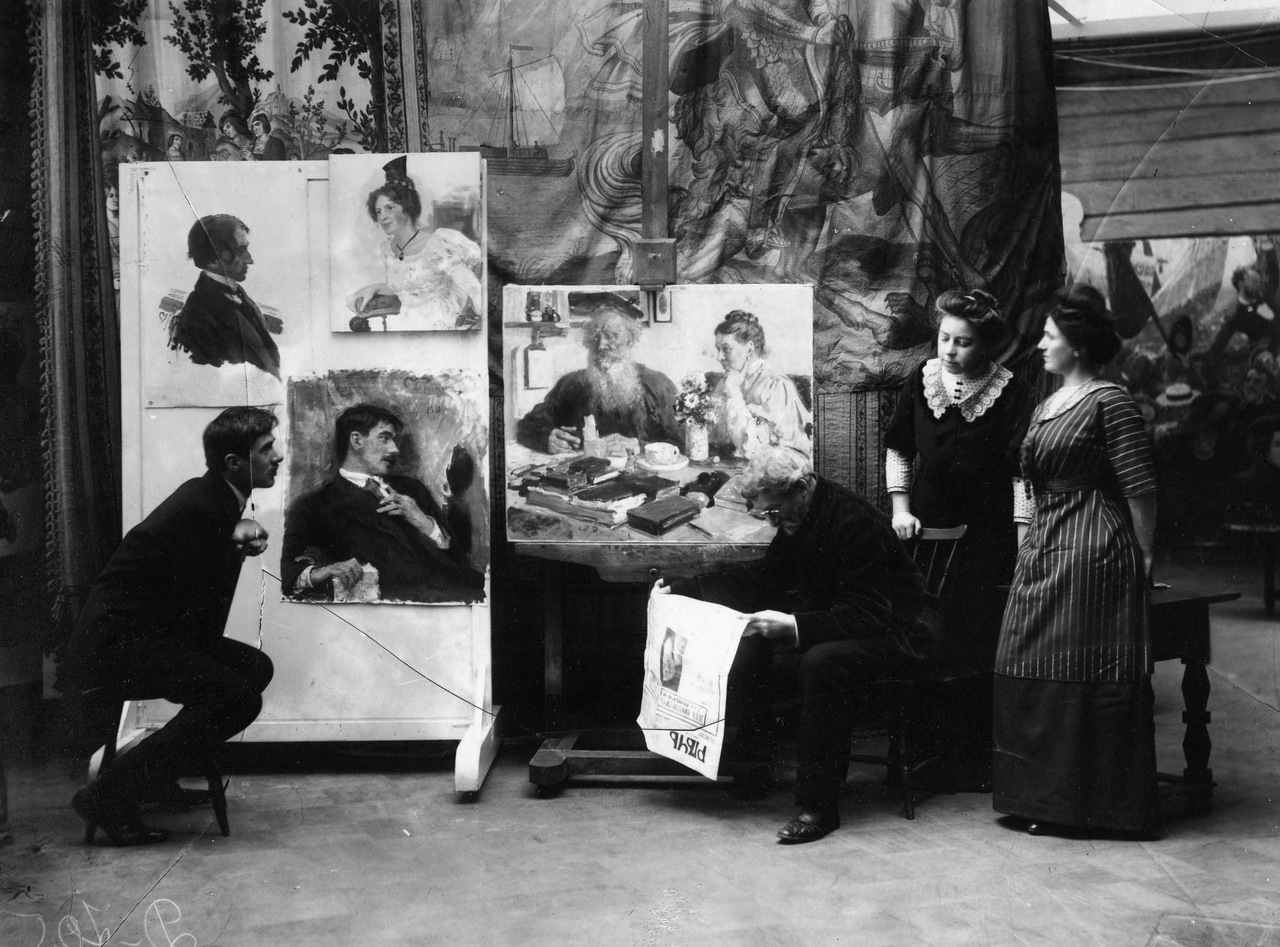
Ilya Yefimovich Repin reads the announcement of Leo Tolstoy death. Present Korney Chukovsky and Nordman-Severova (Repin's wife).

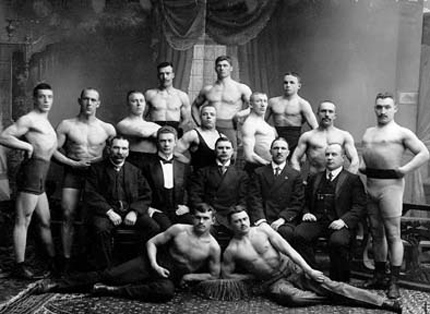
Opening of the Hercules club, 1912

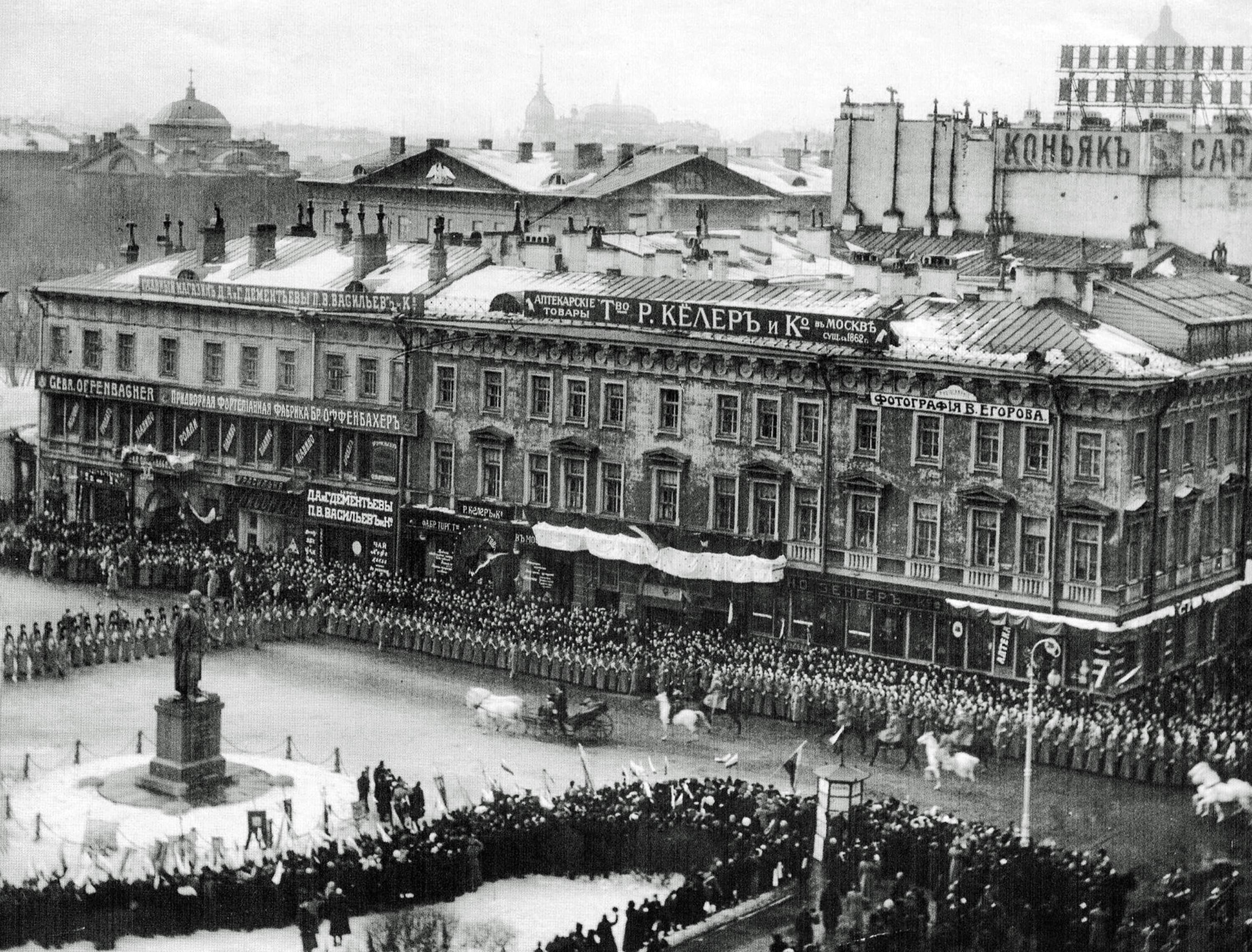
Kazan Cathedral House. Nevsky Prospect, 25. Celebrating the 300th anniversary of the Romanov dynasty. 1913

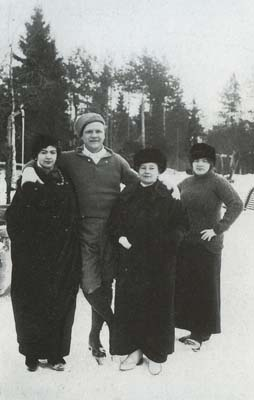
Feodor Chaliapin and his friends ice skating, 1914

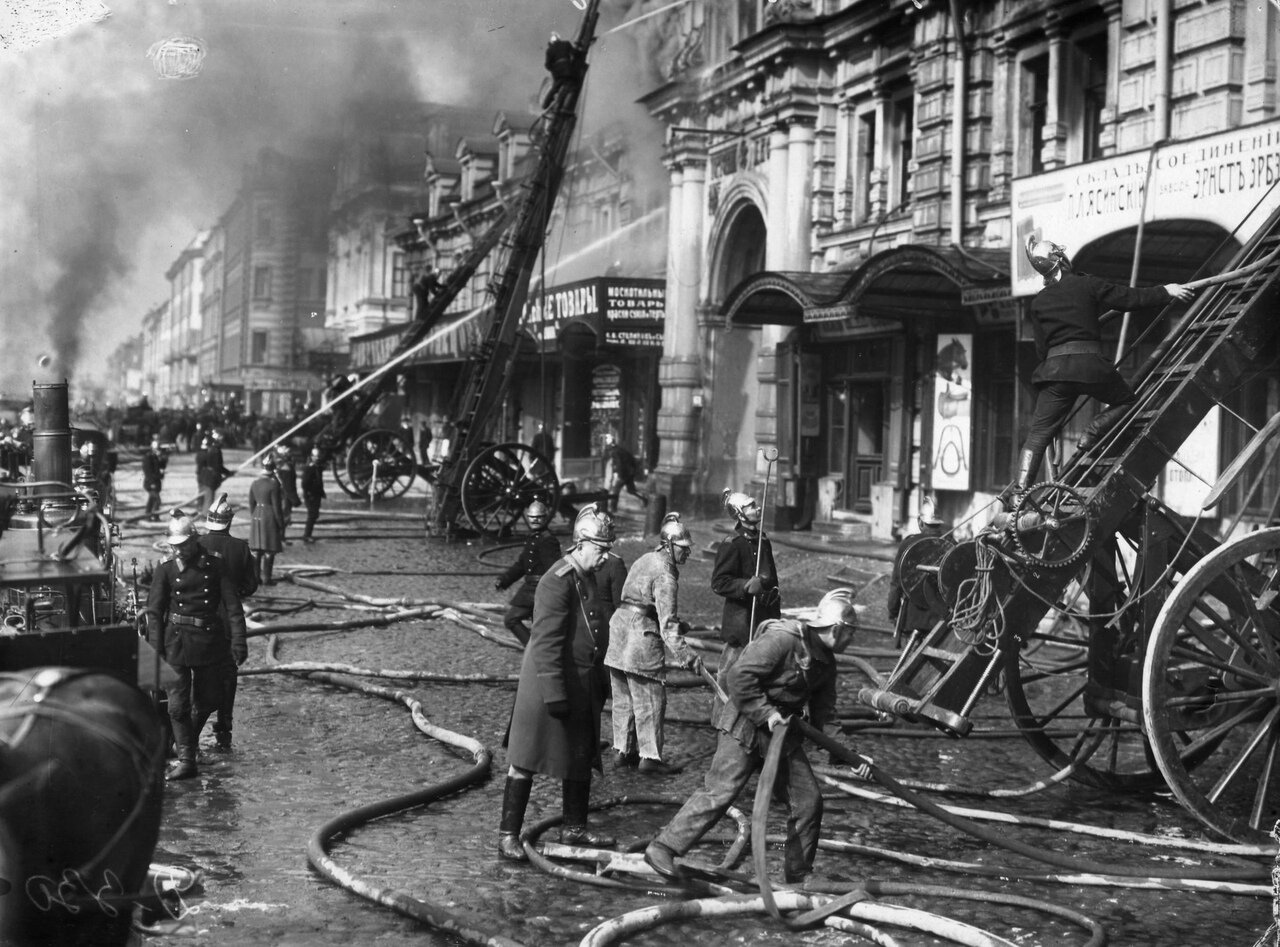
Apraksin Dvor on fire, July, 1914

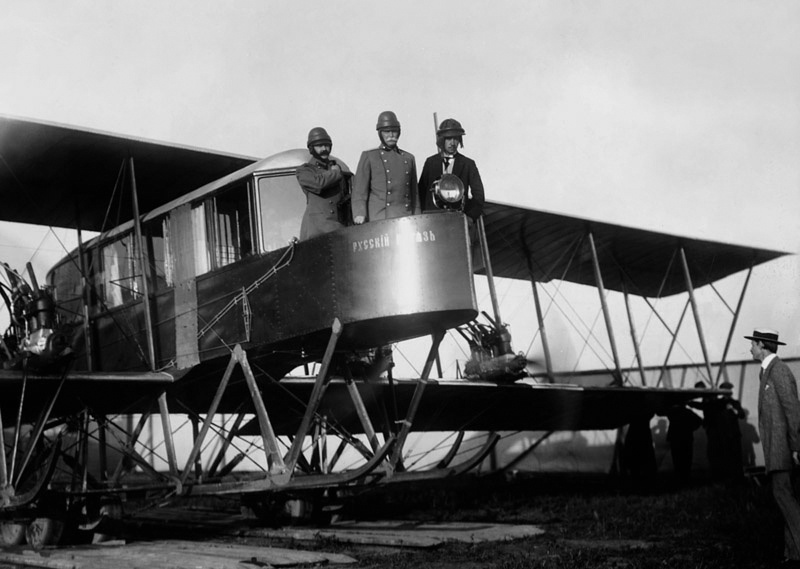
Igor Sikorsky, Genner and Kaulbars aboard airplane Russian Vityaz, 1915

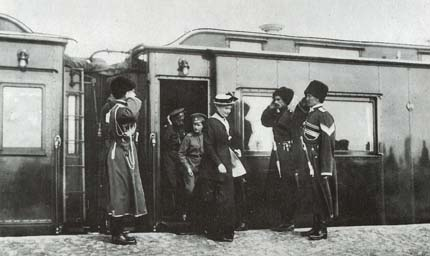
Nicholas II, Tsarevich Alexei and Alexandra Fyodorvna arrive to Stavka, May 1916
