= Jansen =

Jansen may refer to:

== People ==
- Jansen (surname), a Dutch-South African surname, cognate of Johnson

== Places ==
- Jansen, Saskatchewan, Canada
- Jansen, Colorado, United States
- Jansen, Nebraska, United States

== Other uses ==
- Jansen AG, Swiss steel and plastic company, founded by Josef Jansen of Aachen
- Jansen (crater), lunar crater named after Dutch inventor of the telescope Sacharias Jansen
- Jansen's metaphyseal chondrodysplasia, rare disease discovered by the orthopedic surgeon Murk Jansen
- Jansenism, Catholic theological movement named after the Dutch theologian Cornelius Jansen

== See also ==
- Janse, Dutch surname
- Janson (disambiguation), Scandinavian surname
- Janssen (disambiguation), Dutch surname
- Janssens, Dutch surname
- Jannsen, a surname
