= Passage (department store) =

Department store in Saint Petersburg, Russia

Coordinates: 59.935462°N 30.334454°E

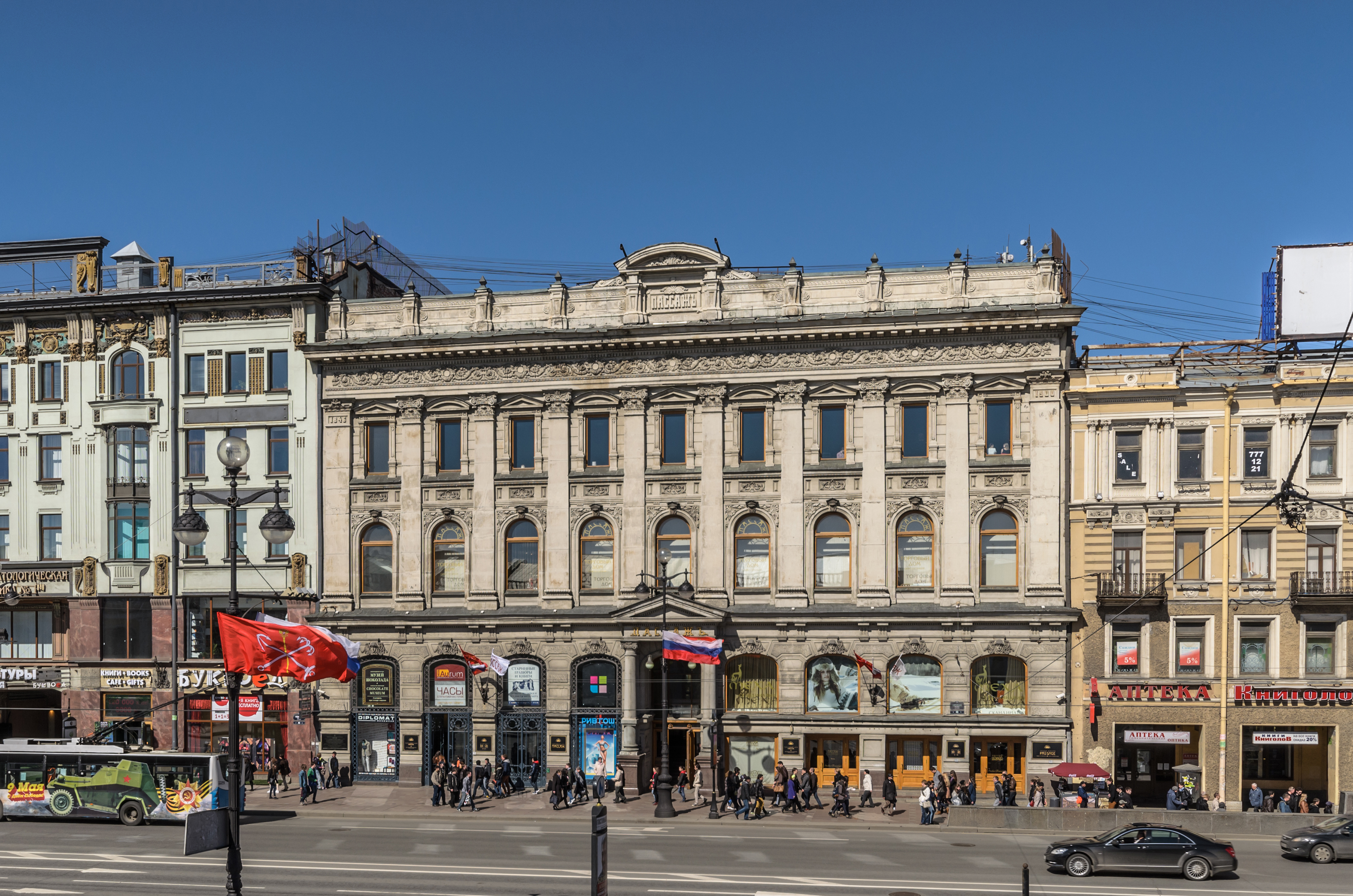
The exterior of the Passage.

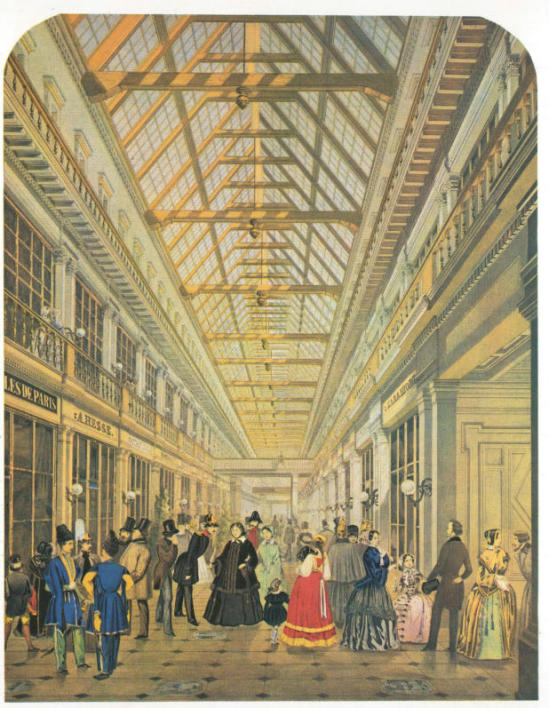
The interior of the old Passage in the 1850s.

The Passage (Russian: Пассаж, romanized: Passazh), from the French word passage, is an élite department store on Nevsky Avenue in Saint Petersburg, Russia, which was founded in 1848. The Passage premises have long had associations with the entertainment industry and houses the Komissarzhevskaya Theatre.

== 19th century ==
The site where the Passage sprawls had been devoted to trade since the city's foundation in the early 18th century. It had been occupied by various shops and warehouses (Little Gostiny Dvor, Schukin Dvor, Apraksin Dvor) until 1846, when Count Essen-Stenbock-Fermor acquired the grounds to build an elite shopping mall for the highest echelons of the Russian nobility and bourgeoisie.

The name came from a vast gallery between Nevsky Avenue and Italianskaya Street which provided the main passage through the mall. The gallery was covered over by an arching glass and steel roof, thus giving it a claim to being one of the world's first shopping malls, along with Passage du Caire in Paris (1798) Burlington Arcade in London, Galerie Vivienne in Paris (1823) and Galeries Royales Saint-Hubert in Brussels.

The three-storey building of the Passage opened its doors to consumers on May 9, 1848. It was one of the first structures in Russia to employ gas for lighting. Another innovation was an underground floor, where an electric station would be installed in 1900. Although the store specialized in jewellery, expensive clothes and other luxury goods, crowds of common people flocked to see the most fashionable shop of the Russian Empire. A fee of 50 kopecks had to be introduced in order to limit admissions.

Stenbock-Fermor conceived of the Passage as more than a mere shopping mall, but also as a cultural and social centre for the people of St Petersburg. The edifice contained coffee-houses, confectioneries, panorama installations, an anatomical museum, a wax museum, and even a small zoo, described by Dostoyevsky in his extravaganza "The Crocodile, or Passage through the Passage". The concert hall became renowned as a setting for literary readings attended by the likes of Dostoevsky, Turgenev, and Taras Shevchenko.

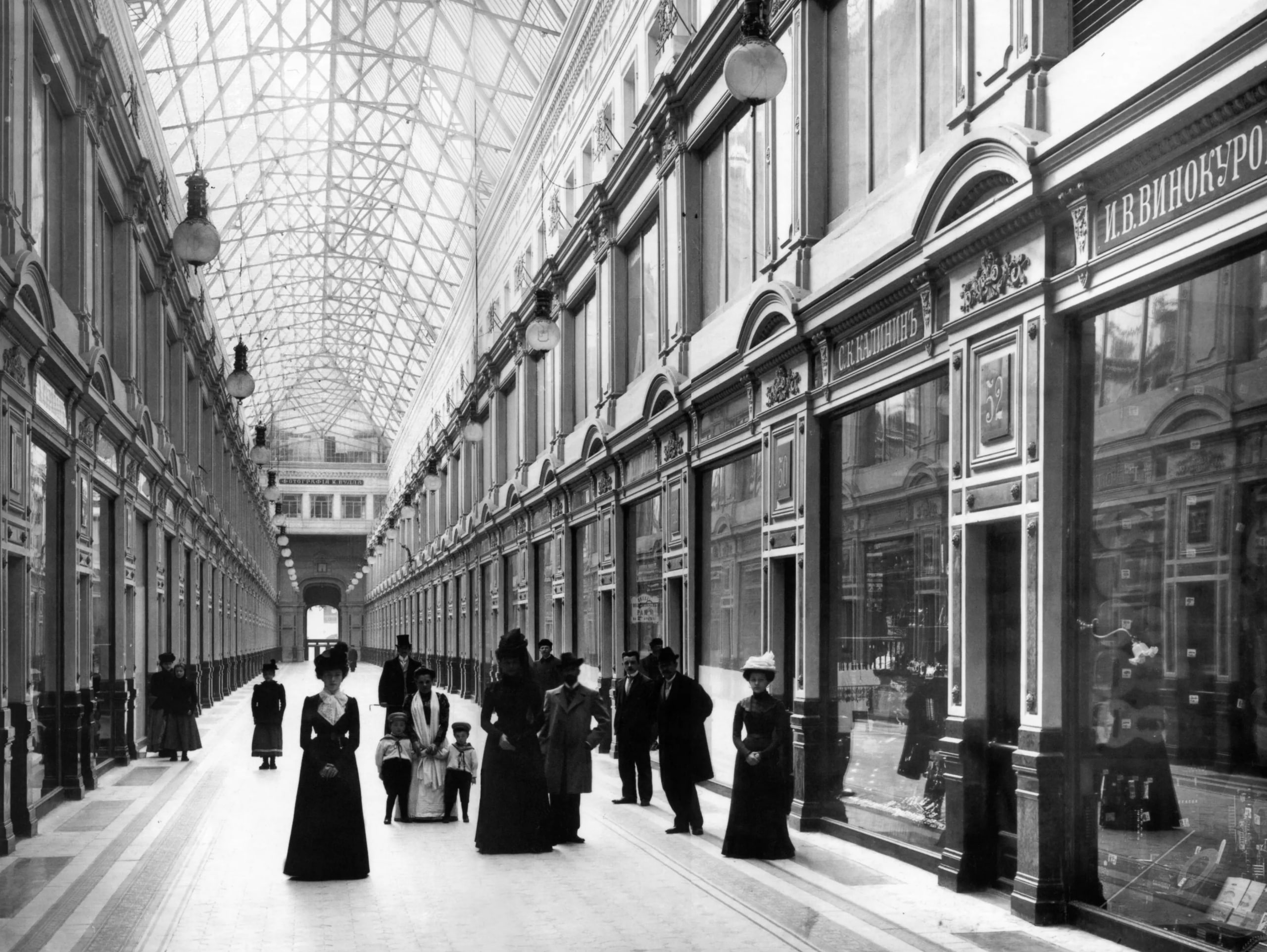
Within the renovated Passage, 1902.

== 20th century ==
In 1897 the ownership of the Passage passed from Stenbock-Fermor's heirs to Princess Nadezhda Boryatinsky. A great fire in 1898 necessitated a major renovation, funded by the Crédit Lyonnais, a bank which leased a large portion of the store as its offices. In 1900, the building was revamped, with the addition of a further storey, and refaced in Radom sandstone. The new owner transformed the former concert hall into a theatre employing Vera Komissarzhevskaya as its artistic director. To draw even more consumers to the store, the Soleille, one of the largest cinemas in the Russian capital, was opened in the complex in 1908.

After the Russian Revolution of 1917 and the following several years of disorder, the store was reopened as the Passage Supermarket in 1922. It continued in this capacity until 1933, when the municipal authorities declared the Passage a "model department store", the only one in Leningrad (as the former St Petersburg was then known) and one of only three such stores in the Soviet Union. The renovated "palace of Soviet trade" (as the media touted it) opened in 1934 and offered about 30,000 types of goods, all manufactured in the USSR. The Children's World section became especially popular with the inhabitants of Leningrad.

The Passage remained a showcase of the Soviet industry until the onset of World War II. During the Siege of Leningrad, the shop was closed but the majority of employees chose to remain day and night. The building's glass roof was subjected to intensive bombing, but amazingly the interior sustained little damage. The Passage was restored and reopened for business in 1947. Since 1961, this historic department store has been specializing in goods for women.

== 21st century ==
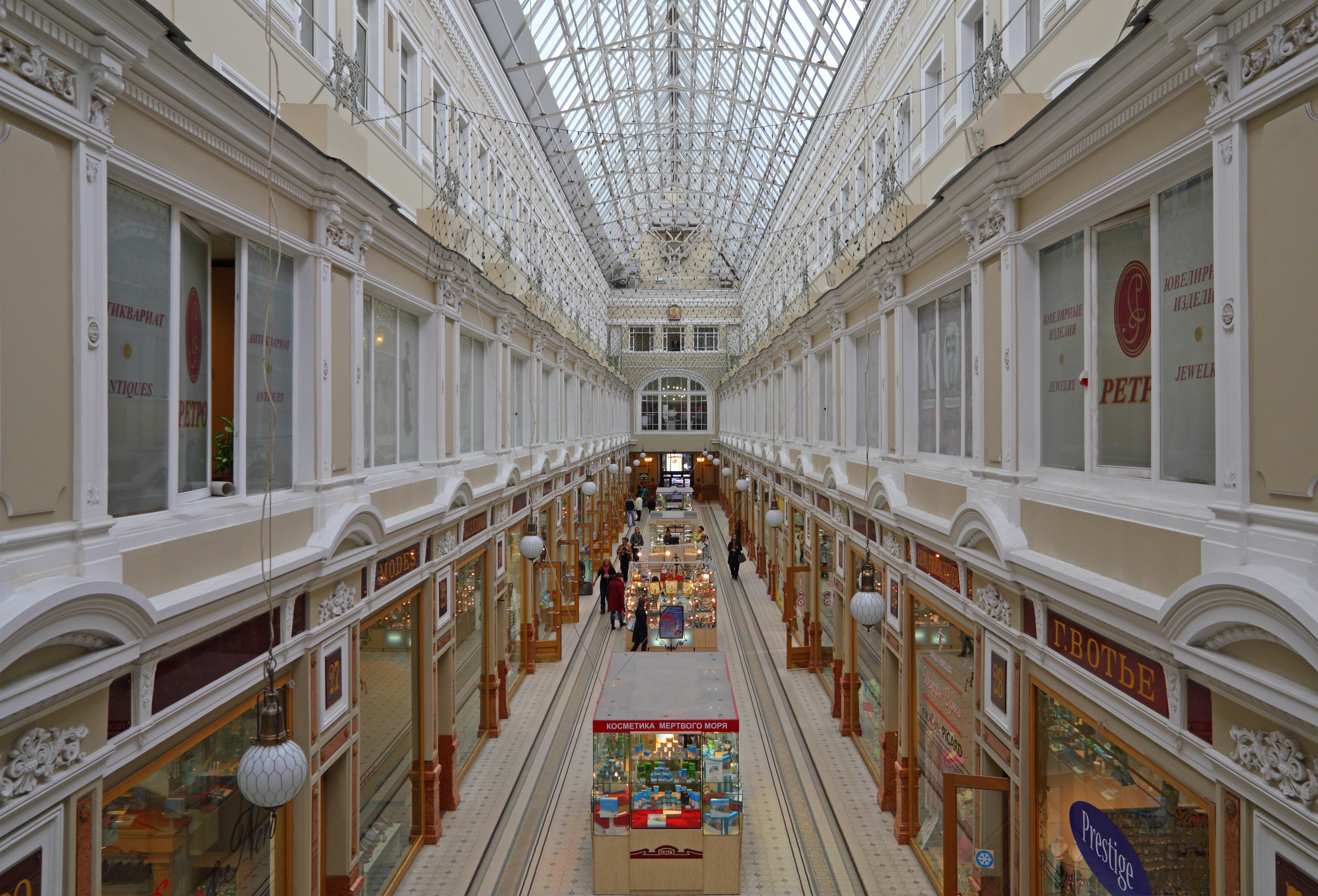
Contemporary interior of the Passage

The Passage is now privately owned by employees and shareholders. Updates and renovations throughout the entire building were done to meet modern international standards. Expanded showrooms welcomed more customers. Passage established relations with new trade and business partners, such as Escada, and other international department stores. One of the first upscale food markets in Russia, with a wide variety of international produce, opened in the basement. New restaurant opened on the upper level with the panoramic view of the Nevsky Prospect.

Jensen Group (real estate investment and development company based in Saint-Petersburg, Russia) acquired Nevsky Passage from VTB Bank in September 2011. (Analysts valued the amount of transaction at $80mln.)

== See also ==
- Arcade (architecture)
- Galleria Vittorio Emanuele II
- Petrovsky Passage
- Retail
- State Universal Store
