= Jensen =

Jensen may refer to:

== People and fictional characters ==
- Jensen (surname), a list of people and fictional characters
- Jensen (given name), a list of people
- Jensen (gamer), Danish professional League of Legends player

== Places ==
- Jensen, Queensland, Australia, a suburb of Townsville
- Jensen, Utah, United States, a census-designated place

== Business ==
- Jensen Electronics, an electronics brand owned by Audiovox Corporation
  - Jensen Loudspeakers
- Jensen-Group NV, an international company that manufactures machines for the heavy-duty laundry industry
- Jensen Group, an investment company dealing with Russian real estate
- Jensen Motors, a defunct British manufacturer of sports cars and commercial vehicles
- Jensen Steam Engines, a maker of model/toy steam engines

== Other uses ==
- Jensen Prize, for the best papers in the Journal of Financial Economics
- Jensen!, a late-night Dutch television show
- Jensen Oval, Sydney, Australia, a soccer park
- Jensen MotorSport, an auto racing team that competes in the Firestone Indy Lights series
- Jensen, development codename for the DECpc AXP 150 computer
- 5900 Jensen, an asteroid

== See also ==
- East Jensen Island, Greenland
- West Jensen Island, Greenland
- Jansen (disambiguation)
- Jenson (disambiguation)
