= Valerie Rockefeller Wayne =

American environmentalist, philanthropist

- Born: Valerie Blanchette Rockefeller; 1971 (age 54–55); Charleston, West Virginia, U.S.
- Education: Stanford University (BA); Teachers College, Columbia University (MAT); Bank Street College of Education (M.Ed.)
- Occupations: Special needs teacher, environmentalist, philanthropist
- Spouses: James Douglas Carnegie (m. 2000; div. 2002) Steven William Wayne (m. 2004)
- Children: 3
- Parent(s): Jay Rockefeller; Sharon Percy Rockefeller
- Family: Rockefeller family

Valerie Blanchette Rockefeller Wayne (born 1971) is an American environmentalist, philanthropist and member of the Rockefeller family. She is a great-great-granddaughter of John D. Rockefeller. Wayne currently serves as co-chair of BankFWD, a network to persuade banks to phase out financing for fossil fuel and to lead on climate. She previously served as chair to the Rockefeller Brothers Fund.

She currently also serves on the board of trustees for several organizations, including Achievement First, Asian Cultural Council, Teachers College, Columbia University, Greenwich Academy, Gilder Lehrman Institute of American History, Rockefeller Philanthropy Advisors and The Trust for Mutual Understanding.

== Early life and education ==
Rockefeller was born in Charleston, West Virginia to Jay Rockefeller and Sharon Percy Rockefeller as the second eldest child. She has three brothers, including Justin Rockefeller. She completed a Bachelor of Arts (BA) in International Relations at Stanford University and completed a MAT in Secondary Social Studies from Teachers College, Columbia University. She also holds a Master of Education from Bank Street College of Education.

== Career ==
Her professional background is as a middle school special education teacher. She began her teaching career at Central Park East Secondary School in East Harlem, New York and also taught in Australia (where she met her first husband).

== Personal life ==
Rockefeller was married twice; initially she married James Douglas Carnegie in 2000, which resulted in divorce without children. On September 19, 2004, she married Steven William Wayne (b. 1966), with whom she has three children: two daughters and a son. Her husband is the founder and chief executive officer of Jensen Group NV. They reside in Old Greenwich, Connecticut.
