= Kazan Cathedral House =

Historic building in Saint Petersburg, Russia

- Дом Казанского собора (in Russian)
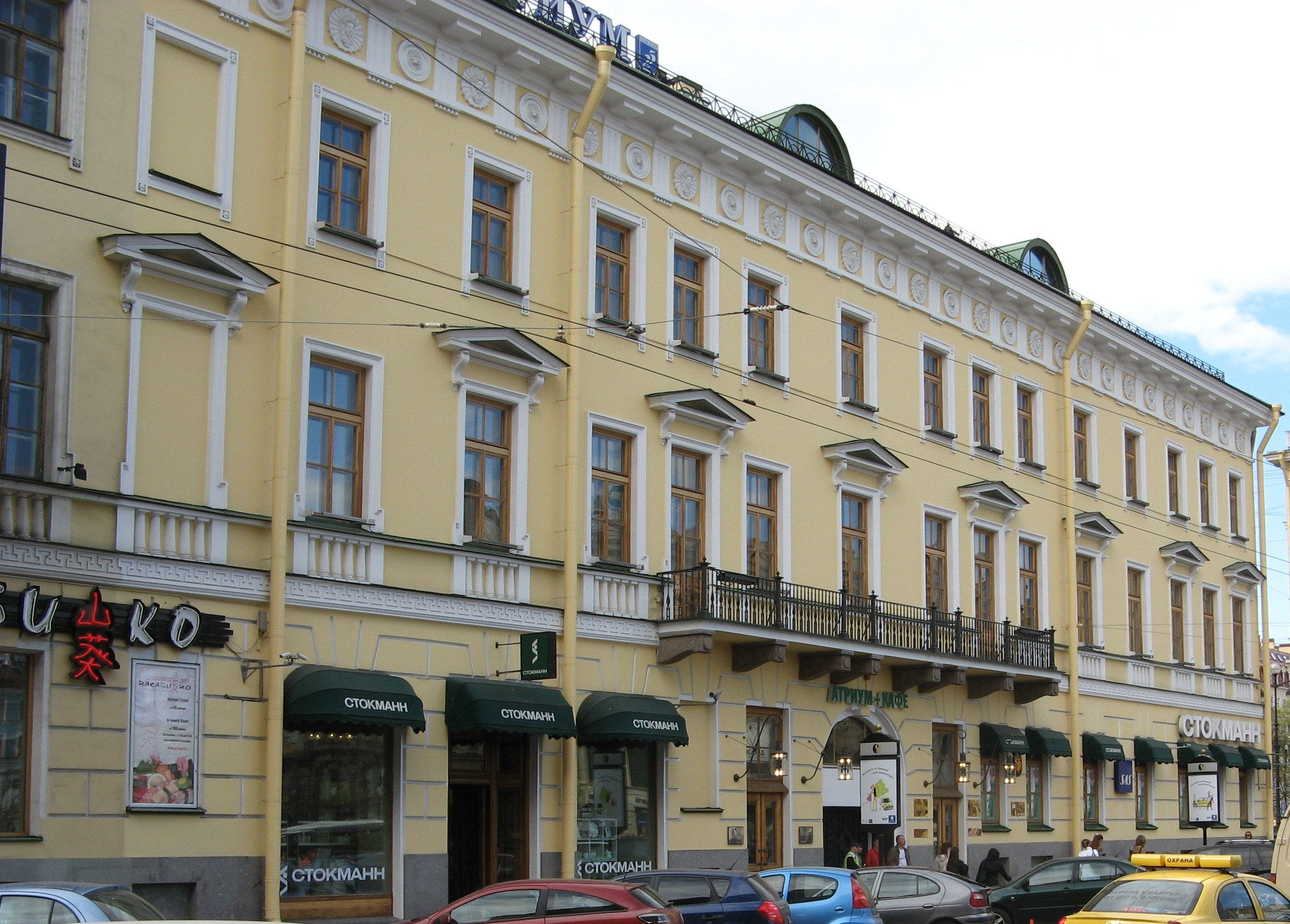
- Kazan Cathedral House in 2011
- Interactive map of the Kazan Cathedral House area
- Alternative names: The house of the clergy of the Kazan

General information
- Architectural style: Russian Neoclassicism
- Location: 25 Nevsky Prospect, Saint Petersburg, Russia
- Coordinates: 59.9355°N 30.3234°E
- Completed: 1813
- Inaugurated: 1817

Design and construction
- Architects: Vasily Stasov, Andrey Voronikhin

Kazan Cathedral House (Russian: До́м Каза́нского собо́ра, romanized: Dóm Kazánskogo sobóra), also widely known as the house of the clergy of the Kazan Cathedral (Russian: До́м церко́внослужителей Каза́нского собо́ра), is a historic building in Saint Petersburg, Russia. The building was built in 1813-1817 in the style of Russian Neoclassicism. Architects—Vasily Stasov, Andrey Voronikhin. Before the Russian Revolution, the house belonged to the clergy of the Kazan Cathedral (since 1813). Location: St. Petersburg, Nevsky Prospect, 25 & Kazanskaya street, 1. Regional object of cultural heritage.

== Bibliography ==
- Кириков Б.М., Кирикова Л.А., Петрова О.В. Невский проспект. — Москва, Санкт-Петербург: Центрполиграф, МиМ-Дельта, 2004.
- Божерянов И. Н. Невский проспект. Культурно-исторический очерк двухвековой жизни C-Петербурга. Юбилейное издание. [В двух томах (пяти выпусках)]. — СПб.: Поставщик Двора Е. И. В. А. И. Вильборг, [1901-1903]. Том 1. Вып.1-2. (1901—1902). [4], IX, 185, 8, LXVI с. с илл.; 33 л. илл. и факсимиле. Том 2. Вып.3-5. (1902—1903). — С. 191-467, 9-14, III, LXVII-LXXVIII с. с илл.; 40 л. илл.

== Gallery ==
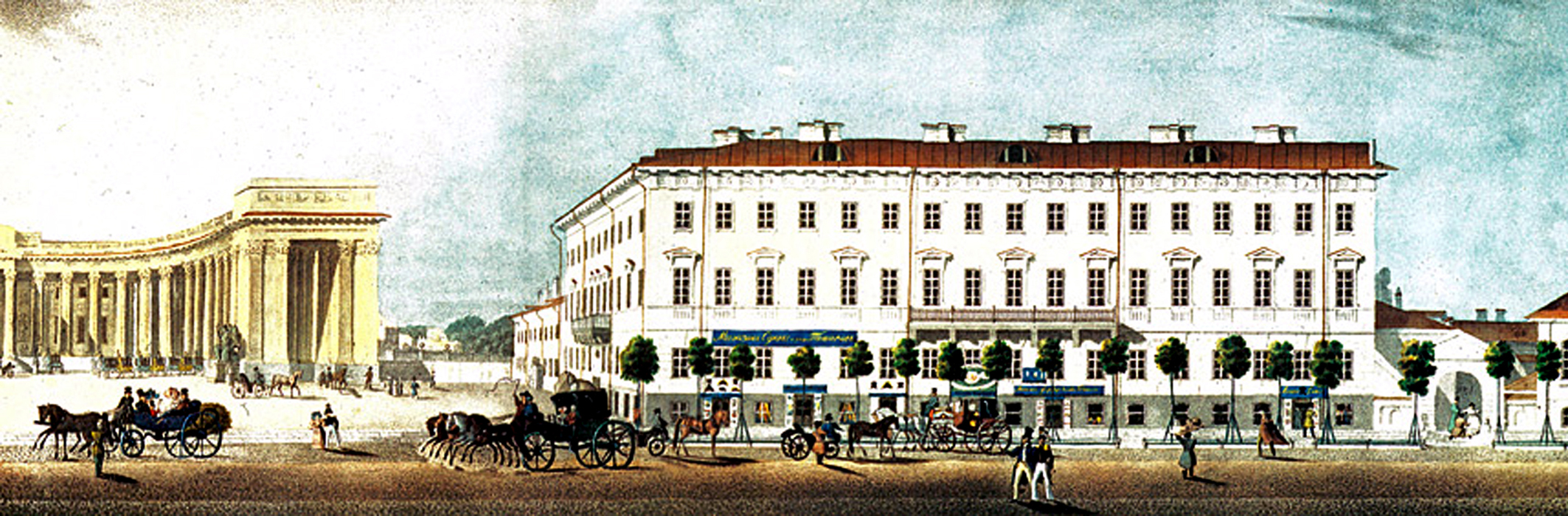
Vasily Sadovnikov. Kazan Cathedral House/ Nevsky Prospect, 25. Lithography 1830-1835
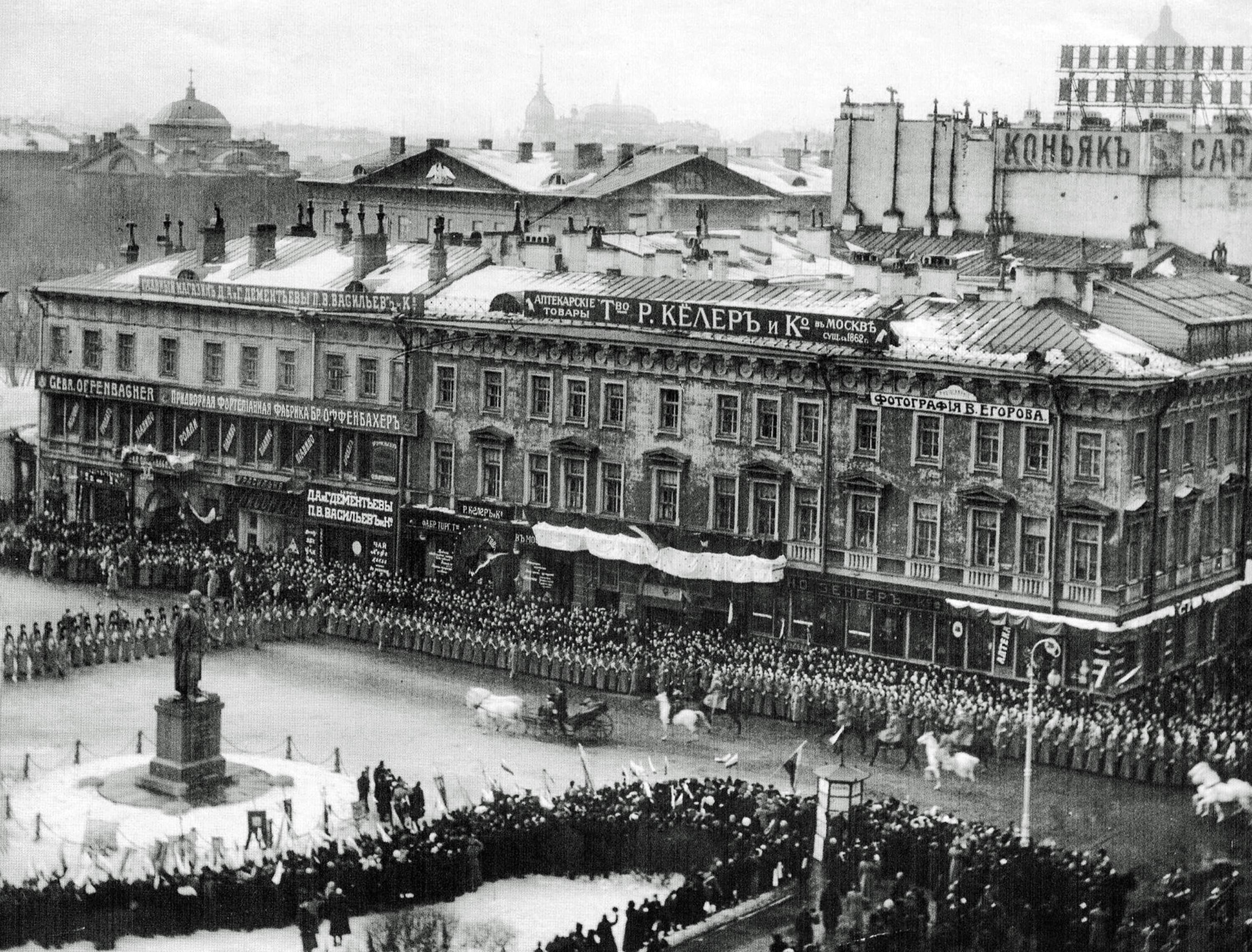
Kazan Cathedral House/ Nevsky Prospect, 25. Celebrating the 300th anniversary of the Romanov dynasty. Photo by Karl Bulla. 1913

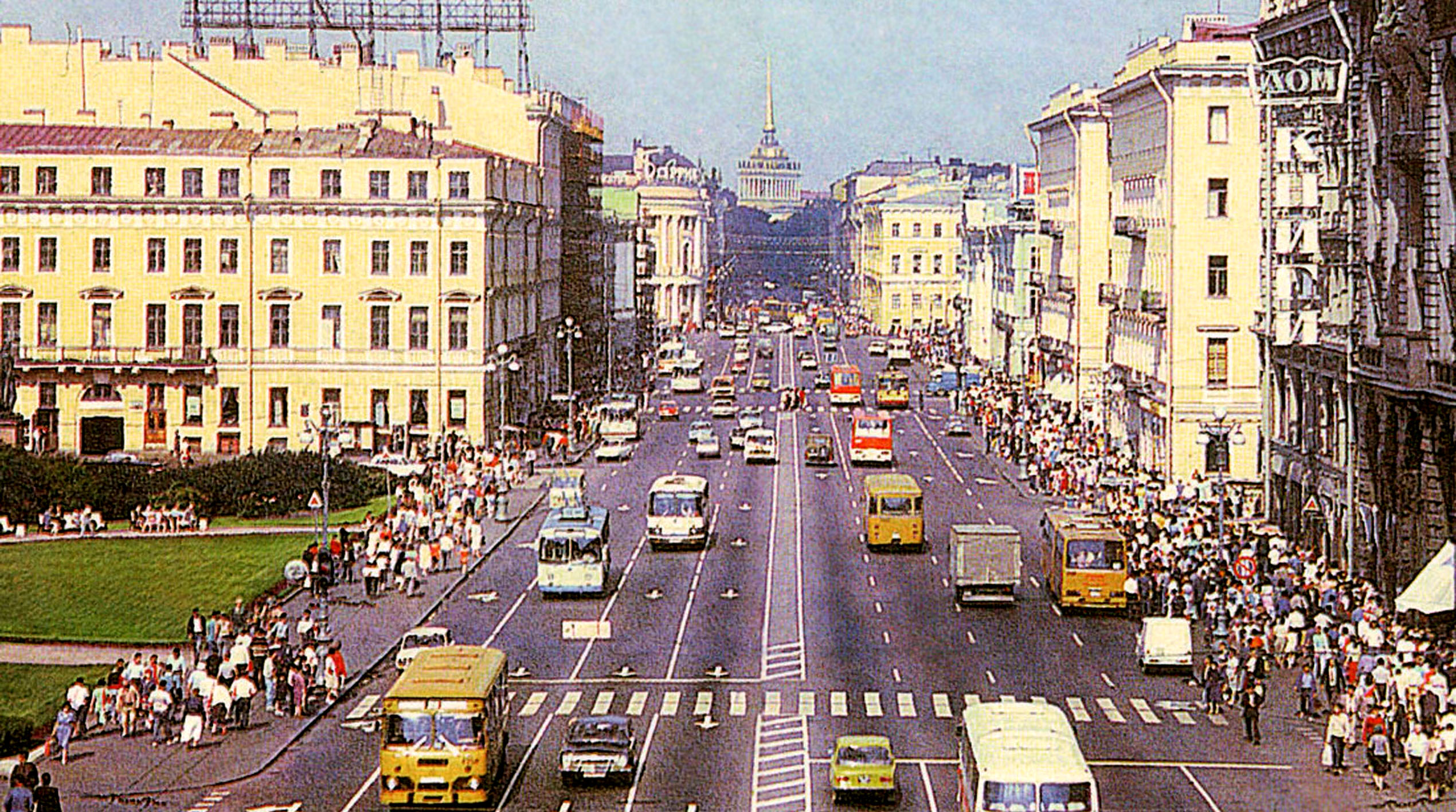
Panorama of Nevsky Prospect. Kazan Cathedral House/ Nevsky Prospect, 25 (on the left). 1987

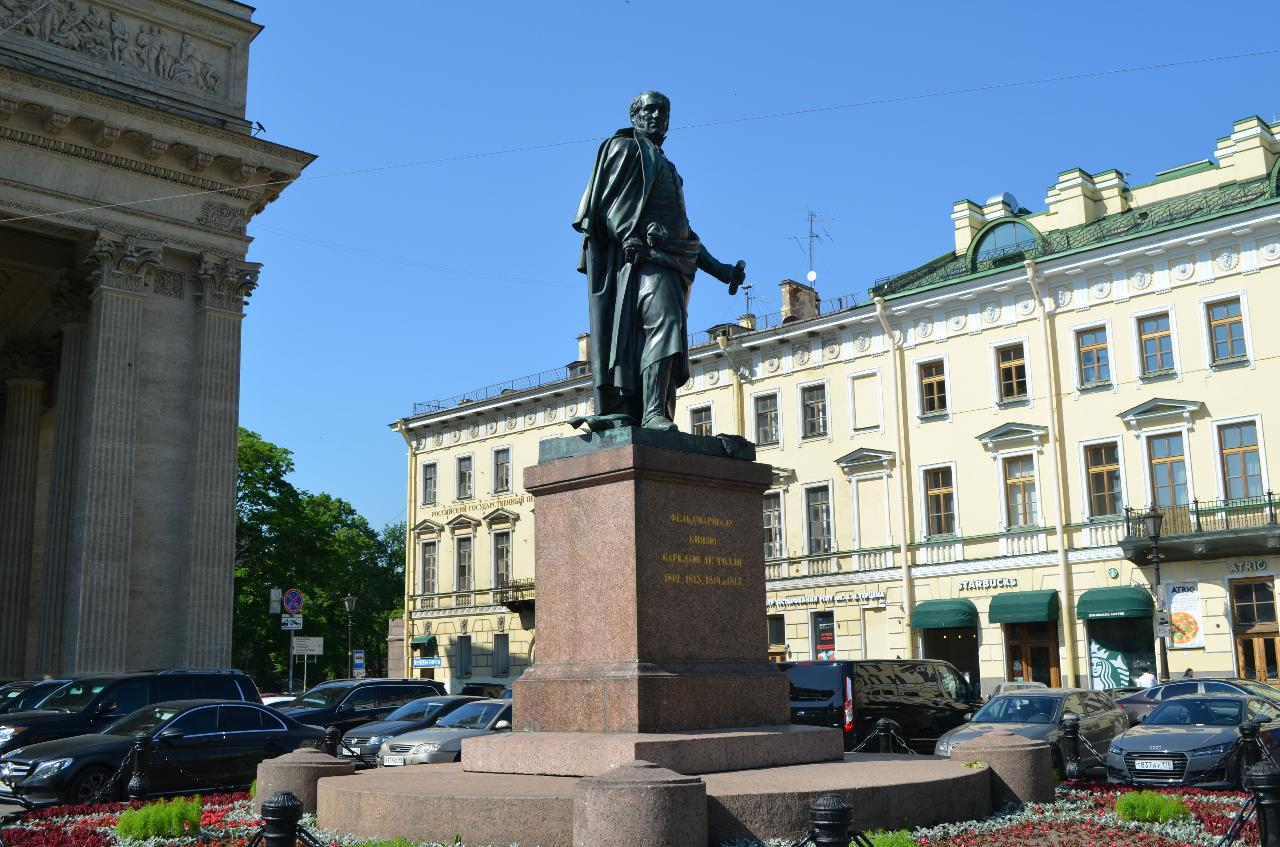
Kazanskaya Ploshchad (Kazan Square) and Kazan Cathedral House. 2019
