= Jansons =

Jansons (feminine: Jansone) is the Latvianized form of the surname Janson. Notable people with the surname include:

- Aigars Jansons (born 1971), Latvian wrestler
- Arvīds Jansons, Latvian conductor
- Dans Jansons, Latvian freestyle skier
- Jānis Alberts Jansons (1892–1971), Latvian folklorist, literary scholar and educator
- Jānis Jansons (born 1982), Latvian floorball player
- Jānis Jansons (bobsledder), Latvian bobsledder
- Jānis Jansons-Brauns (1872–1917), Latvian revolutionary, literary critic and journalist
- Liene Jansone, Latvian basketball player
- Mariss Jansons (1943–2019), Latvian conductor
- Sven Jansons, Dutch athlete
- Ulafs Jāņsons, pen name of Uldis Ģērmanis, Latvian historian, writer, and publicist
- Valija Veščunas-Jansone, Latvian lawyer
- Vera Jansone (1915–2004), Latvian-born American architect
- Zaiga Jansone, Soviet-Latvian tennis player and tennis coach
