= Viktor Bulla =

Russian photographer and filmmaker (1883–1938)

Victor Karlovich Bulla
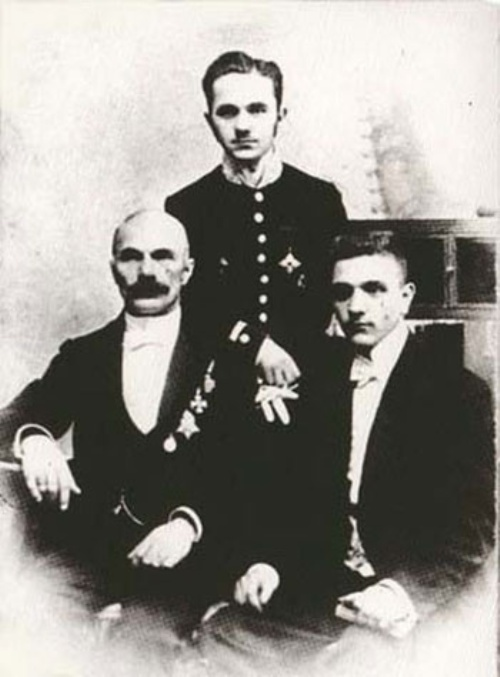
- Karl, Alexander and Viktor Bulla
- Born: Виктор Карлович Булла; 1 August 1883; Saint Petersburg, Russian Empire
- Died: 1 October 1938 (aged 55)
- Citizenship: Russia, Soviet Union
- Occupation: photographer
- Years active: 1899–1938
- Parent: Karl Bulla

Viktor Karlovich Bulla (Russian: Виктор Карлович Булла; 1 August 1883 – 30 October 1938) was a Russian and Soviet photojournalist, photographer and cinema pioneer.

== Biography ==
=== Early life ===
Viktor Bulla was a son of the renowned German photographer Karl Bulla. Raised in a Catholic family, he attended a British School in St. Petersburg in 1899 before studying photography in Germany. After completing his studies, he worked with his brother Alexander in his father's photography firm, Bulla & Sons.

Viktor Bulla's work was first recognized when he was 19 years old, working as a photojournalist for the Siberian Reserve Brigade during the Russian-Japanese war. His reports from the front were published in the journals Niva and Sparks, and were often reprinted in Russian and overseas news publications. He was at the center of wartime events, and was awarded the silver medal for Courage.

=== 20th century and revolution ===
After the war, he returned to his job as a photojournalist in the family photo agency, and soon developed an interest in newsreels. In 1909, he and his brother Alexander Bulla launched a documentary film company Apollo. Viktor was the partnership's cameraman, producer and director. Apollo produced and distributed newsreels, nature films, films covering sporting events (including an international skating competition in Vyborg and a 1910 automobile race from St. Petersburg to Rome and back), and adaptations of classic works of literature (including A. Ostrovsky and M. Maeterlinck's On The busiest place and Blue Bird, and even a fairy tale, The Frog Princess).

After the outbreak of World War I, Viktor returned to work in the family photography agency, shooting the revolutionary events of 1917–1918 in Russia and taking part in the creation of a documentary film on the February Revolution of 1917, titled Chronicle of the Revolution in Petrograd. His dynamic and still shots served as the foundation for directors Sergei Eisenstein and M. Chiaureli in the creation of films about the revolution of 1917.

Viktor photographed the events of the October 1917 Bolshevik coup, and directed the photography of the Petrograd Soviet. He was one of the progenitors of film and photographic depictions of Vladimir Lenin, filming Lenin in the eighth and ninth congresses of the Russian Communist Party in 1919 and 1920, and during the second and third congresses of the Comintern, in 1920 and 1921. He created portraits of Grigori Zinoviev, Lev Kamenev, Joseph Stalin and many other Soviet communist leaders, essentially acting as a staff photographer in Smolny.

In 1928 Viktor and his brother Alexander Bulla submitted 30 photographs to the exhibition Soviet photography over 10 years. The jury awarded them an honorary diploma.

In 1935, the Bulla family's photographic collection, consisting of approximately 132,683 negatives, was handed over to the local archives (Archive of the October Revolution and Socialist Construction of the Leningrad Region).

=== Arrest and execution ===
In 1936, he was dismissed from the position of the agency's head and forbidden to do artistic work. The lab was supposed to do just routine commercial work for the residents of the city.

On 19 July 1938, Bulla was arrested, allegedly following a denunciation from the new director of Bulla photo agency. The Soviet NKVD interrogated him twice. The first round of questioning failed to produce any charges against Bulla, but during the second interrogation he was forced to confess to espionage activities. In addition, the Soviet authorities designated him as an "enemy of the people". Bulla was initially sentenced into exile and "ten years in solitary confinement" which was a euphemism for execution by shooting. Bulla was executed on 30 October 1938. His fate remained unknown for many years, and as a result some unfounded rumours spread about him having died in one of the Soviet prison camps in 1942–1944.

== Relatives ==
Viktor's son, Yuri (born in 1919) also became a photographer and worked in Leningrad, pioneering photojournalism for the newspaper Lenin sparks. He died in 1941 at the Leningrad front.

Bulla's grandson and daughter, Valentina and Andrey Leonovich Kaminski, still live in St. Petersburg.

== Award ==
- Silver Medal for Courage on the St. George Ribbon for his service in the Russian-Japanese war.

== Book ==
- Anthology of Soviet photography, 1917–1940. Moscow: Planet Publisher, 1986.
