= Jensen (given name) =

Jensen is a unisex given name. Notable people with the given name include:

== Men with the name ==
- Jensen Ackles (born 1978), American actor
- Jensen Atwood (born 1976), American actor
- Jensen Gomez (born 1991), Filipino vocalist, musician, and producer
- Jensen Huang (born 1963), Taiwanese and American entrepreneur
- Jensen Karp (born 1979), American writer
- Jensen Lewis (born 1984), American professional baseball pitcher
- Jensen Plowright (born 2000), Australian professional racing cyclist
- Jensen Weir (born 2002), English professional footballer

== Women with the name ==
- Jensen Buchanan (born 1962), American actress
- Jensen Castle (born 2001), American amateur golfer
- Jensen Daggett (born 1969), American actress
- Jensen Kyra (born 1993), Musical artist
- Jensen McRae (born 1997), American singer-songwriter and poet

== See also ==
- Jensen (surname)
- Jensen (disambiguation)
- Jenson (disambiguation)
- Jens (disambiguation)
