= Romanov Tercentenary =

Celebration in the Russian Empire

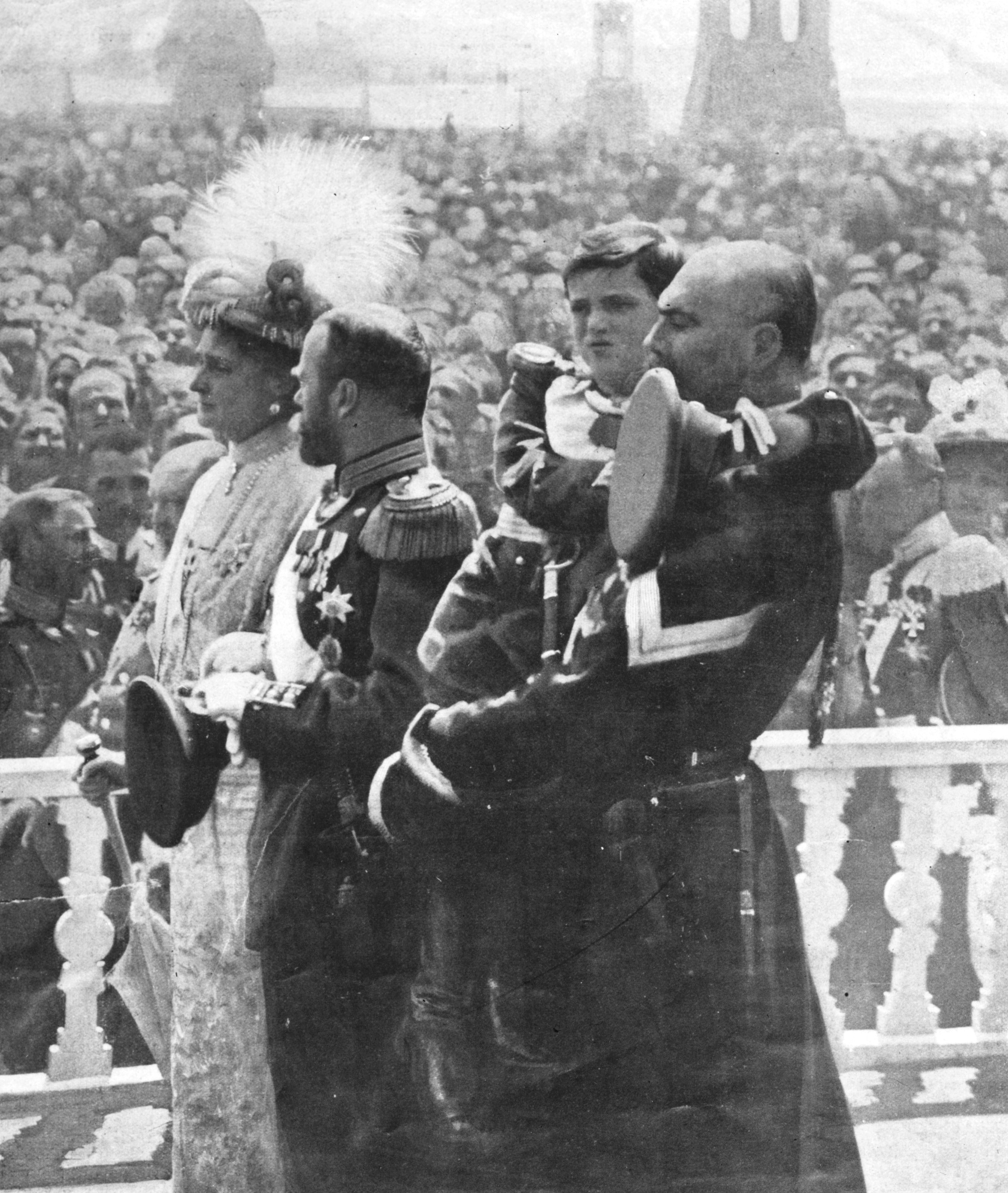
Tsar Nicholas II and Tsarina Alexandra during the tercentenary celebrations in Moscow. Tsarevich Alexei is being carried by a Cossack after collapsing due to haemophilia.

The Romanov Tercentenary (Russian: Трёхсотле́тие до́ма Рома́новых, romanized: Trokhsotlétiye dóma Románovykh, lit. 'Tercentenary of the House of Romanov') was a country-wide celebration, marked in the Russian Empire from February 1913, in celebration of the ruling House of Romanov. After a grand display of wealth and power in St. Petersburg, and a week of receptions at the Winter Palace, the imperial family embarked on a tour following Mikhail I Romanov's route after he was elected tsar by the Zemsky Sobor of 1613, a sort of pilgrimage to the towns of ancient Muscovy associated with the Romanov dynasty, in May.

It has been described as an 'extravaganza of pageantry' and a tremendous propaganda exercise; but among its principal goals were to 'inspire reverence and popular support for the principle of autocracy', and also a reinvention of the past, 'to recount the epic of the "popular tsar", so as to invest the monarchy with a historical legitimacy and an image of enduring permanence at this anxious time when its right to rule was being challenged by Russia's emerging democracy', a retreat 'to the past, hoping it would save them from the future'. Throughout the jubilee, the leitmotiv as it were was the cult of seventeenth century Muscovy, with its patrimonialism (with the tsar owning Russia as a private fiefdom), personal rule with the tsar a representation of God on earth, and the concept of a mystical union between the 'Little Father Tsar' and his Orthodox subjects, who revered and adored him. In the celebrations, the symbols of the tsar were in the centre, with all symbols of the state pushed far into the background.

== History ==
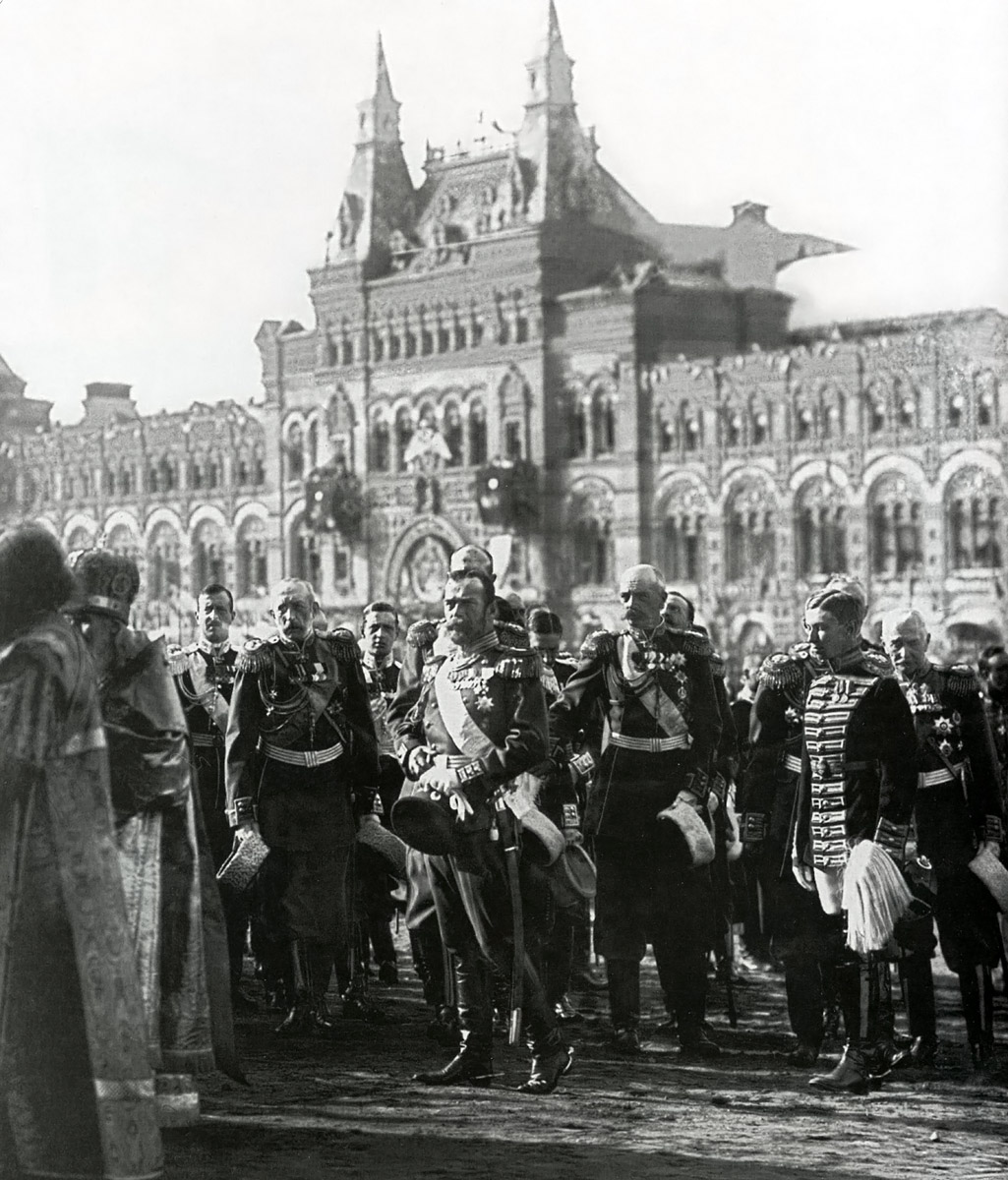
Nicholas II at the Red Square during the Tercentenary

The tercentenary kicked off in the imperial capital Saint Petersburg on a rainy February morning. The event had been on everyone's lips for several weeks leading up the actual date, and dignitaries from across the empire had gathered in the capital's grand hotels: princes from the Baltic and Poland, high-priests from Armenia and Georgia in the Caucasus, and mullahs and tribal chiefs from Central Asia alongside the Khan of Khiva and the Emir of Bukhara. Additionally there was a large group of visitors from the provinces as well as workers, leaving the usual well-dressed promenaders of the Winter Palace outnumbered. The city bustled with these visitors, and Nevsky Prospect experienced among the worst traffic jams in history due to the converging of cars, carriages and trams. The streets were decorated in the imperial colors of blue, red and white, statues were dressed with ribbons and garlands, and portraits of the line of tsars going all the way back to the Romanov dynasty's founder Michael were hung up on the facades of banks and stores. Over tram lines chains of light were hung up, spelling out 'God Save the Tsar' or portraying the Romanov double-headed eagle with '1613–1913' underneath it. For many of the provincial visitors this was their first sight of electric light, and they stood in wonder of the 'columns, arcs and obelisks of light'.

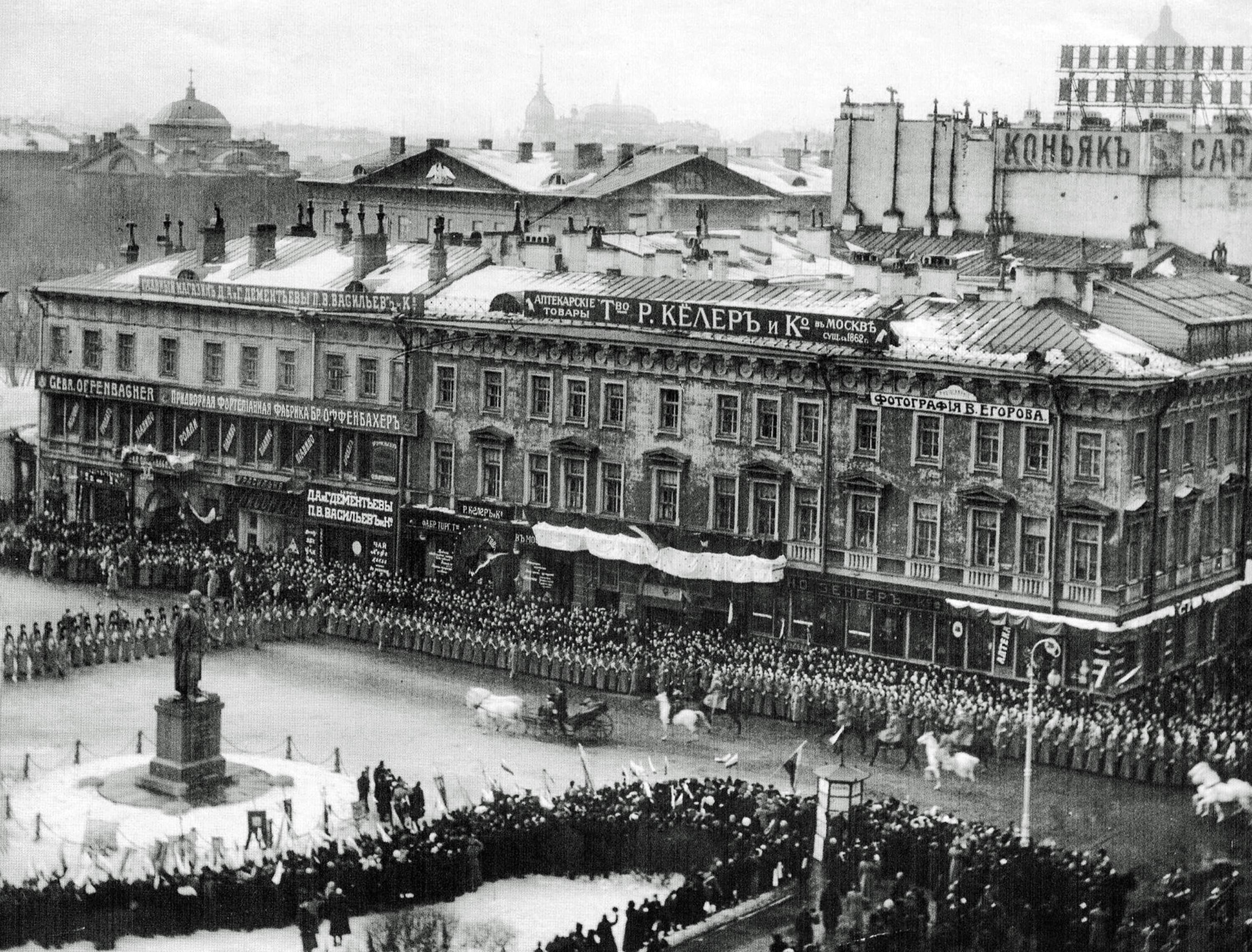
Celebrating the 300th anniversary of the Romanov dynasty. Kazan Cathedral House. Photo by Karl Bulla

The rituals started in the Kazan Cathedral, outside of which stood a white pavilion filled with bromeliads, incense and palms, and where a vast crowd carrying icons, crosses and banners had been gathering since the morning. Inside the Cathedral were Russia's 'ruling class', with grand dukes and princes, marshals of nobility, court members, members of government including ministers, senators, and state councillors alongside duma parliamentarians, senior civil servants, military leaders such as generals and admirals, and provincial governors, city mayors, and zemstvo leaders. Patriarch Gregory IV of Antioch who had arrived especially for the occasion from Greece, led a 'solemn thanksgiving', alongside the three Russian metropolitans and fifty St. Petersburg priests. The imperial family had driven from the Winter Palace in open carriages, escorted by two squadrons of His Majesty's Own Horseguards and Cossack riders donning black caftans and red Caucasian hats. The tsar, Nicholas II, rode for the first time in public since the 1905 Revolution. Along their route were Imperial Guards decorated in 'gorgeous' uniforms, and military bands playing the national anthem. During the ceremony two doves flew down from the dome and hovered for several seconds over Nicholas II and his son, which the Tsar took as God's blessing on his dynasty. The ceremony in the Kazan Cathedral also bore witness to a conflict between Rasputin and Duma President Mikhail Rodzianko. Rodzianko had complained that the seating of the Duma members was at the back, behind those of the state councilors and senators, which he found beneath their dignity. After complaining to the master of ceremonies, pointing out that an assembly of the people had elected Mikhail as tsar in 1613, their seats were swapped with those of the senators. When he went to his new seat, he discovered Rasputin occupying his chair. After a heated exchange of words, only ended by a sergeant-at-arms' intervention, Rasputin left the building in a waiting carriage. Prime Minister Vladimir Kokovtsov was equally outraged by the court's attitude towards the elected government during rituals of the tercentenary.

Factories were closed for a public holiday, and free meals were given out from municipal canteens to celebrate the 300th anniversary. Rumors circulated that pawnshops were offering pawned items back without interest, but once the crowds learned that this was not the case, several pawnshops had their windows smashed. 2,000 prisoners were to be released under amnesty to mark the anniversary, and women gathered outside the city jails hoping their men would be among the released. Later in the afternoon a sound and light show saw large crowds gather in the square to watch. Stalls sold beer and pies, alongside Romanov flags and souvenirs. In the parks there were concerts and parks. When darkness fell Nevsky Prospect 'became one solid mass of people'. Fireworks lit up the sky, and lights 'criss-crossed' the city, and swept across the rooftops, lingering a while over significant monuments. The Admiralty's spire 'burned like a torch', and the Winter Palace was illuminated by three vast portraits of the ruling tsar, Peter the Great and dynasty founder Michael I.

The royal family remained for one week in the capital, receiving guests at the Winter Palace where 'long lines' of dignitaries were waiting to present themselves to the royal couple in the palace's concert hall. A luxurious ball was held in the Noblemen's Assembly, where Grand Duchess Olga attended alongside her parents in one of her first social events. A stir was caused when she danced polonaise with Prince Saltykov, who breached etiquette when he forgot to take off his hat. At Marinsky Theatre, a gala performance of Glinka's A Life for the Tsar was held, which had featured prominently during the jubilee. Meriel Buchanan, daughter of the British Ambassador George Buchanan, remarked how the vast display of jewels and tiaras swayed 'like a field of poppies' when they all arose to greet the tsar. Despite the appearance of Nicholas' former mistress, Mathilde Kschessinska, who came out of retirement to dance the mazurka, the 'sensation of the evening' was tenor Leonid Sobinov, who, standing in for Shaliapin, was dressed as Michael I Romanov – the first time a Romanov tsar had been represented on the stage. Meriel Buchanan also noted how the pale tsarina's fan trembled in her hands as she struggled breathing and how her emotions seemed to have a firm grip over her; she also noted how a small wave of resentment 'rippled over the theatre' as she arose and left after a few whispers to the emperor, not to be seen again the rest of the evening. The empress was strained by the jubilee, and she often left all public functions early with clear signs of distress. Orlando Figes notes that this was because the empress had not appeared in public more than a dozen occasions in a decade, after her son was born a haemophiliac. Also, just before the anniversary her son's condition had taken a turn for the worse, and the view that the tercentenary celebrations was an ideal possibility to improve public opinion of the tsarina, she was only perceived as arrogant and cold.

=== Provincial tour ===
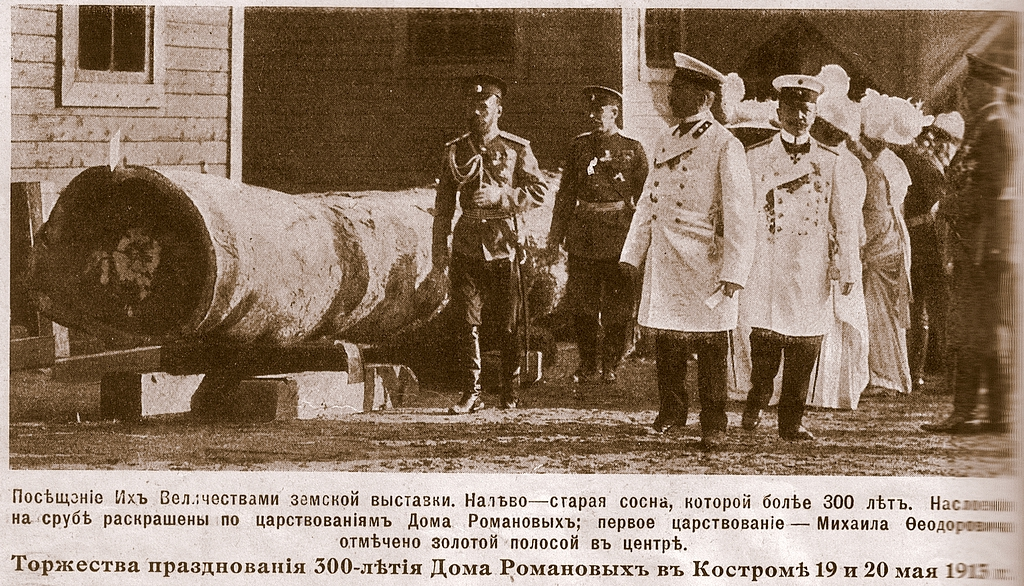
Nicholas II in Kostroma, next to a fell anniversary pine

Three months later, in May, the imperial family went on a tour, a sort of pilgrimage, following the route of Mikhail I after his election as ruler in 1613, and the tour was to visit all ancient towns of Muscovy associated with the founding of the Romanov dynasty. The tour started off in Kostroma, where they arrived in a 'flotilla of steamboats' on the Volga, greeted by a large crowd of townspeople. Here Nicholas visited the Ipatiev Monastery, where Michael had sought refuge from the invading Poles and the Muscovite civil wars, and posed for a photo with the descendants of Boyars who had offered the crown to Mikhail. From there, the tour went to Vladimir, Nizhny Novgorod and Yaroslavl, by rail in a luxurious train. To the monastery town of Suzdal the party had to travel in thirty open-top Renaults, as there were no railways.

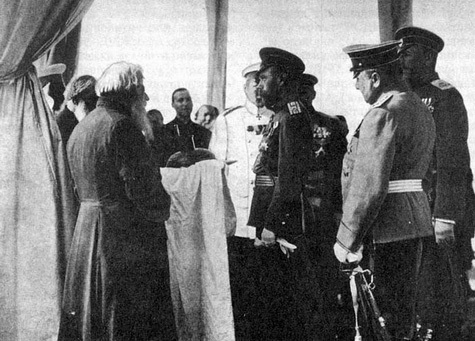
Nicholas II accepts offering of bread and salt from Old Believer in Yaroslavl

The pilgrimage 'climaxed' when the imperial family triumphantly arrived in the historical capital Moscow, site of the crowning of the first Romanov ruler, at Alexandrovsky train station, greeted by a large number of dignitaries. The tsar mounted a white horse and rode alone, sixty feet ahead of the rest of the party and his Cossack guard escort, towards the Kremlin in front of large cheering crowds. The decorations of Tverskaya Street, with velvet banners donning Romanov symbols spanning the boulevard, buildings covered in pennants, flags, and lights 'even more inventive' than those in the capital, garlanded statues of the tsar and a showering of confetti from the people, were 'even more magnificent than in St. Petersburg.' The tsar dismounted in the Red Square, the convergence point of the religious processions throughout the city who flocked to him, where he walked by rows of priests chanting and for prayers entered the Uspensky Cathedral. The young Tsarevich was, along the rest of the family, also supposed to walk the last hundred yards, but he collapsed due to haemophilia, and had to be carried by a Cossack guard to the 'exclamations of sorrow' from the crowds. It was followed by, in the words of historian Orlando Figes, 'another round of pageantry and gastronomy. The ball in the Assembly of the Moscow Nobility was particularly lavish, far beyond the wildest dreams of Hollywood.' During the ball the Empress felt so ill she could hardly stand up, and was only rescued from fainting in public by her husband Nicholas II intervening and leading her away in time.

== Symbolism ==
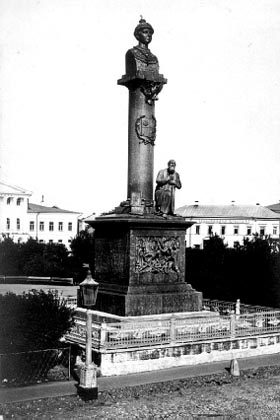
Monument to Michael I and Ivan Susanin in Kostroma (demolished 1917).

The communion between the tsar and his Orthodox subjects was the central theme of the celebrations. Central to this was the cult of Russian peasant Ivan Susanin, which was to show that the 'simple' Russian people loved the tsar. Susanin had lived on the Kostroma Romanov estate, and according to legend he misled the Poles looking to kill Mikhail Romanov on the eve of his ascension to the throne, at the cost of his own life. Performances of Glinka's A Life for the Tsar was staged throughout Russia by schools, regiments and amateur companies. Pamphlets and the penny press printed the story of Susanin ad nauseam, and one newspaper told how Susanin had shown each and every soldier how to fulfil his oath to the sovereign. The image of the seventeenth-century peasant therefore featured prominently in the tercentenary; one example is the Romanov Monument in Kostroma, where a female personification of Russia gave blessings to a kneeling Susanin. In Kostroma Nicholas II was presented with a group of peasants from Potemkin who claimed to be descendants of Susanin.

Jubilee propaganda claimed that the election of the Romanov dynasty in 1613 had been a 'crucial moment of national awakening', and the first real act of the national state of Russia. It was said that the entire country had participated in the election, and that through it, the Romanovs had come to embody the will of the people. This was reflected among other places in the words of one propagandist who wrote that 'The spirit of Russia is incarnate in her Tsar', 'The Tsar stands to the people as their highest conception of the destiny and ideals of the nation.' This in practice meant that Russia and the Romanov dynasty was one and the same, and Nicholas II was presented as Russia incarnate during the anniversary. The newspaper Novoe vremia wrote of this saying that 'In every soul there is something Romanov. Something from the soul and spirit of the House that has reigned for 300 years.'

The religious status of the tsar in the public's consciousness also figured heavily, and his role as Tsar Batiushka ("Father Tsar"), a god on earth. The myth of the good tsar was something the courts propagandists increasingly relied on as the revolutionary crisis grew. The tsar was depicted as a man of modest lifestyle and simple tastes, 'intimately acquainted' with each peasant, and 'carrying for their every need.' For the jubilee a biography – the first ever made for a living tsar – was published, which depicted him as an overlooking father of his people, keeping a compassionate and earnest watch over their needs. It also wrote that he devoted special care to the development of the peasantry, and that he often visited their huts to 'partake their milk and black bread', that he would talk 'genially' with the peasants at official functions, whereafter the peasants would cross themselves and feel happier the rest of their life. It wrote of the 'thousands of invisible threads centr[ing] in the tsar's heart, and these threads stretch to the huts of the poor to the palaces of the rich.' He was also depicted as wearing peasant robes, eating peasant food like borscht and blinies, and sharing their habits. During the tercentenary, pictures were taken of him acting symbolic homages to the peasantry, tasting the rations of soldiers or inspecting new types of ploughs. All of this was to give the impression that the tsar, no matter how trivial something was, came under his attention, and that his influence was omnipresent.

Throughout the jubilee the cult of seventeenth century Muscovy, with its patrimonialism (with the tsar owning Russia as a private fiefdom, votchina), personal rule with the tsar an embodiment of God on earth, and the concept of a 'mystical union' between the 'Father Tsar' and his Orthodox subjects, who revered and adored him as both father and God, had played a central role as the leitmotiv of the celebrations. In the celebrations, the symbols of the tsar was in the centre, with all symbols of the state pushed far into the background.

== Aftermath ==
It has been described as an 'extravaganza of pageantry' and a tremendous propaganda exercise undertaken by the Romanov dynasty in an unstable time for the monarchy. Among its principal goals were to 'inspire reverence and popular support for the principle of autocracy', but also a reinvention of the past, 'to recount the epic of the "popular Tsar", so as to invest the monarchy with a mythical historical legitimacy and an image of enduring permanence at this anxious time when its right to rule was being challenged by Russia's emerging democracy'. It was according to Figes a retreat 'to the past, hoping it would save them from the future'.

The success of the celebrations nurtured a stronger confidence in the tsar's ambitions of a popular autocracy, as the tsar returned from the tour stating that 'my people love me'. His wife, Tsarina Alexandra, wrote to him describing the events as showing how the state ministers 'constantly' threatening the tsar with talks of revolution were cowards, as they only had to show themselves and 'at once their hearts are ours'. Figes notes that the only ones convinced by the illusions of the anniversary were the court itself. Nicholas began looking to move closer to his dream of personal rule, and it also spawned talks of travelling the Russian interior, sailing down the Volga or visiting the Caucasus or Siberia. He also thought about closing the Duma, inspired by his more reactionary ministers, or turning it into a consultative body such as the Muscovite Land Assembly (Zemsky Sobor) of the 1500s.

Fedor Linde, sergeant of the Finland Regiment, was allowed to return to Russia under amnesty to celebrate the tercentenary, after being exiled for his involvement in the organization of an 'academic legion' alongside the Social Democrats to spread propaganda to the working class.

=== Foreign reactions ===
Not only the court, however, was 'swept away' by the rhetoric of the jubilee. The Times wrote of the tercentenary that 'no hope seems too confident or too bright', regarding the Romanov's future in a special edition covering the jubilee. It also reported that stamps depicting the tsar made in commemoration of the anniversary had to be recalled when 'some royalist post-office clerks refused to impress the obliterating postmark on these hallowed visages'. It concluded that 'these loyal and eminently respectable scruples are typical of the mind of the vast masses of the Russian people'. The British Foreign Office agreed, writing that 'nothing could exceed the affection and devotion to the person of the Emperor displayed by the population wherever His Majesty appeared. There is no doubt that in this strong attachment of the masses ... to the person of the Emperor lies the great strength of the Russian autocracy.'

== Bibliography ==
- Emmerson, Charles (2013). 1913: The World before the Great War. London: The Bodley Head. p. 122. ISBN 9781847922267. "london times romanov tercentenary."
- Figes, Orlando (2014). A People's Tragedy: The Russian Revolution 1891–1924. London: The Bodley Head. ISBN 9781847922915.
