= Jannsen =

Jannsen is a surname. Notable people with the surname include:

- Lydia Jannsen (1843–1886), Estonian poet known by the pen name Lydia Koidula
- Johann Voldemar Jannsen (1819–1890), Estonian journalist
- Uwe Jannsen (born 1954), German mathematician

== See also ==
- Jansen (disambiguation)
- Janssen (disambiguation)
