= The Crocodile (short story) =

1865 short story by Fyodor Dostoevsky

- Short story by Fyodor Dostoyevsky
- Original title: Крокодил (Krokodil)
- Country: Russia
- Language: Russian
- Genre: Short story

Publication
- Published in: Epoch
- Publication type: Magazine
- Media type: Print
- Publication date: 1865

"The Crocodile" (Russian: Крокодил, Krokodil) is a short story by Fyodor Dostoyevsky that was first published in 1865 in his magazine Epoch. It is a work of satire, parodying political, social and economic themes prevailing in Russia at the time.

== Synopsis ==
The story relates the events that befall one Ivan Matveyevich when he, his wife Yelena Ivanovna, and the narrator visit the Passage on Nevsky Avenue to see a crocodile that has been put on display by a German entrepreneur. After teasing the crocodile, Ivan Matveyevich is swallowed alive. He finds the inside of the crocodile to be quite comfortable, and the animal's owner refuses to allow it to be cut open, in spite of the pleas from Yelena Ivanovna. Ivan Matveyevich urges the narrator to arrange for the crocodile to be purchased and cut open, but the owner asks so much for it that nothing is done. As the story ends Yelena Ivanovna is contemplating divorce and Ivan Matveyevich resolves to carry on his work as a civil servant as best he can from inside the crocodile.
