= Jensen-Group NV =

Belgium-based international company

- Company type: Public
- Industry: Heavy-duty laundries
- Founded: 1937 in Bornholm, Denmark
- Founder: Jørn Munch Jensen (1932-2012)
- Headquarters: East Flanders, Belgium
- Number of employees: 2,299 (2025)
- Website: www.jensen-group.com

Jensen-Group NV is a Belgium-based international company known for manufacturing machines for the heavy-duty laundry industry.

== History ==
Jensen-Group NV started as a repair shop for dairy equipment in 1937, when it was founded by Ejnar Jensen on the island of Bornholm in the Baltic Sea, Denmark. In 1954, Ejnar Jensen's son Jørn Munch Jensen (1932–2012) took over the leadership of the company.

In 1960, the first folding machine developed by Jensen was installed at Bornholm Laundry. In 1970, the company introduced the Jenstack, the first stacker ever during the era.

In the early 1990s, Jensen acquired AB Metric Interconveyor (garment handling systems), Futurail (monorail systems) and Senkingwerk. In 2008, Jensen launched the CleanTech concept to enhance production.

Between 2015 and 2016, Jensen expanded its product portfolio with newer machines.

In 2020, the company experienced a slowdown in activities as a result of the COVID-19 pandemic, but resumed normal operations in 2023 and beyond.

== Reception and partnerships ==
Jensen-Group is listed and traded on the Brussels Stock Exchange under the ticker symbol "JEN".

On January 1, 2018, Jensen-Group acquired a 30% stake in Inwatec ApS, a Danish company. In March 2023, Jensen-Group and MIURA agreed to a joint venture whereby Jensen acquired 49% of the shares of Inax Corporation (“Inax”), a wholly owned Japanese subsidiary of MIURA.
