= Jansen AG =

Swiss company

- Industry: Metal, steel and plastic industry
- Founded: 1923
- Headquarters: Oberriet (SG), Switzerland
- Number of employees: 600 (2022)
- Website: www.jansen.com

Jansen AG is a family-owned company that develops, manufactures and distributes steel profile systems for windows, doors and facades as well as plastic products for the construction industry. It was founded by Josef Jansen in 1923, starting with 6 employees.

The company started producing steel pipes in 1930. In 1955, plastic tubes were added to the range of products. Today, the plastic product portfolio includes systems for geothermal energy, building technology and piping systems. In 1997, a first new production site outside Switzerland was established in Dingelstädt, Germany. In 2021, Jansen AG decided to focus on steel products for windows, doors and facades, spinning-off its supplies for the automotive industry to Mubea.

As the exclusive licensee of Schüco in Switzerland and Liechtenstein, Jansen also offers architects and processors solutions made of aluminium.

In 2023, Jansen AG acquired Rino Weder AG, a company located in Oberriet SG as well. Through this acquisition, powder coating technology was added to its capabilities.

Jansen AG was able to celebrate its 100-years anniversary in 2023.

Since its beginning, the Jansen Group is 100% family-owned and employs 2024 around 600 people internationally.

== Awards ==
- 2019: European Geothermal Innovation Award
- 2013: Preis der Rheinthaler Wirtschaft
