= Kevin Janssens =

Kevin Janssens may refer to:

- Kevin Janssens (footballer), Belgian football player
- Kevin Janssens (actor), Belgian actor
