= Jenson =

Jenson is an patronymic surname meaning "son of Jen", where Jen is a short form of Old French Jehan i.e. John. It may also be an Americanized form of the surnames Jensen or Jenssen. Jenson is also used as a given name.

Notable people with the name Jenson include:

== Given name ==
- Jenson Altzman (born 2002), American racing driver
- Jenson Brooksby (born 2000), American tennis player
- Jenson Button (born 1980), British racing driver
- Jenson Joseph (born 1966), Antiguan cricketer
- Jenson Seelt (born 2003), Dutch footballer

== Surname ==
Jenson
Origin
- Origin: Germany, Denmark
- Meaning: son of Jens
- Region of origin: Germany, Scandinavia

Other names
- Variant form: Jensen

- Alura Jenson (née Elizabeth Marie Spraggins; born 1977), Italian-born American pornographic actress
- Andrew Jenson (1850–1941), Danish-American church historian for the Latter Day Saints
- Bob Jenson (1931–2018), American politician and educator
- Dan Jenson (born 1975), Australian squash player
- Mary Goodrich Jenson (1907–2004), American aviator and journalist
- Nicolas Jenson (1420–1480), French engraver, pioneer printer and typographer
- Robert Jenson (1930–2017), American Lutheran and ecumenical theologian
- Roy Jenson (1927–2007), Canadian actor and footballer; father of Sasha
- Sasha Jenson (born 1964), American actor; son of Roy
- Vicky Jenson (born c. 1957), American animator

== See also ==
- Jensen (given name)
- Jensen (surname)
- Jens (given name)
