= Janson (name) =

Origin
- Origin: Scandinavian
- Meaning: "son of Jan"

Other names
- Variant forms: Jansson, Jenson, Jansons/Jansone

Janson is a Scandinavian patronymic surname, meaning "son of Jan", derived from Johannes. There are alternate Belgian, Dutch, Danish, Latvian, Norwegian and Swedish spellings.

== Surname ==
- Janson (surname)

== Given name ==
While Janson is uncommon as a given name, notable people with this first name include:

- Janson Junk (born 1996), American baseball player
- Janson van Keulen (1593–1661), variant name of Cornelius Johnson, English portrait painter
