= Heine Jenssen =

Norwegian footballer (born 1965)

Personal information
- Date of birth: 31 December 1969 (age 56)
- Position: Defender

Youth career
- Eidsvold Turn

Senior career*
| Years | Team | Apps | (Gls) |
| 1986–1988 | Eidsvold Turn | | |
| 1989−1997 | HamKam | | |
| 1998 | Hamar | | |

International career
| 1985 | Norway U15 | 5 | (1) |
| 1986 | Norway U16 | 5 | (0) |
| 1988 | Norway U18 | 1 | (1) |
| 1987 | Norway U19 | 1 | (0) |
- * Club domestic league appearances and goals

Heine Jenssen (born 31 December 1969) is a Norwegian footballer who mostly played as a defender for Hamarkameratene, including four seasons in the Eliteserien.

Jenssen grew up in Eidsvoll and started his career as a striker in Eidsvold Turn. He was drafted into Eidsvold Turn’s senior squad ahead of the 1986 season. Representing Norway as a youth international, his first international goal came during the Nordic tournament in the summer of 1985, where he scored the fifth goal in a 7–2 routing of Iceland U15. Contesting the 1986 UEFA European Under-16 Championship the following year, Jenssen also won the Tom Lund scholarship and was rewarded with a trial at a European academy. Youth national team coach Svein Arne Sigernes orchestrated a trial at Bayer Leverkusen together with Terje Olsen. The latter was even offered a contract.

Jenssen scored his second international goal in 1988, and was a candidate for Norway’s 1989 FIFA World Youth Championship squad, but was ultimately not selected, and did not play internationally again.

While playing for Eidsvold Turn on the fourth tier, there were minor inquiries from Strømmen IF and Alvdal IL regarding transfer possibilities. Ahead of the 1989 season, Jenssen moved to second-tier team Hamarkameratene. The team had shown their interest in Jenssen, and also boasted two other players from Eidsvoll, Tom Fodstad and Hallgeir Finbråten.

In Hamkam, Jenssen was repurposed from striker to fullback or wing-back. Hamkam won promotion in 1991, and survived a relegation playoff in 1992. Jenssen lost large parts of 1992 due to injury, but was intent on signing a new contract after his current one expired at the end of 1992. In the 1993 Eliteserien, Hamkam survived again, whereas his former teammate Hallgeir Finbråten played for Lyn who struggled.

Jenssen’s only Eliteserien goal came at home against Brann in 1993. Jenssen stole the ball from the feet of opposing goalkeeper Thor-André Olsen, went around Olsen and scored unopposed. Jenssen claimed that he had studied Olsen before the match and noticed Olsen’s difficulties with handling back-passes.

In 1994 and 1995, Heine Jenssen stated that he particularly struggled with opposing winger Kent Bergersen. Bergersen's team Rosenborg beat Hamkam 6–1 at Lerkendal in 1994, followed by a 9–1 routing in 1995. At the latter occasion, Hamkam's manager had tried to employ high pressure, to Jenssen's dismay: "It went well for 20 minutes, but when we became tired and did not do as we were supposed to, it devolved into – yes, simply put: madness". In the same year, as Hamkam managed to beat Bergersen's new team Vålerenga, Bergersen was neutralized to the point that "Heine Jenssen made Kent Bergersen into a mediocre Third Division player". However, Hamkam ended the 1995 Eliteserien in relegation. In the decisive match against Tromsø away, Jenssen received a red card.

Jenssen aired the possibility of leaving Hamkam in late 1996 because their latest contract offer "entailed only half of what I had expected". After the 1997 season, Jenssen definitely decided to wind down his career, and agreed to join lowly Hamar IL. Originally, Hamkam demanded a transfer fee reportedly in the region of 30–40,000 kr. With Hamar IL being a hobby team, its leader regarded the demand as "silly". Jenssen called it "strange" and would rather retire than costing Hamar IL money to buy. In the end, Hamkam agreed to release Jenssen for free. Hamkam and Hamar IL also reached an agreement of intention that future transfers between the clubs should not involve fees. He retired in 1999.
