= Jansson Stegner =

American painter (born 1972)

Jansson Stegner (born 1972) is an artist based in Santa Barbara, California

Stegner was born in Denver. He is a figurative painter whose works reference his interest in artists such as Zurbarán, El Greco and Goya and often feature severely exaggerated depictions of his subjects’ limbs. A common subject is uniformed police officers.

== Selected exhibitions ==
2008

Unreal, Saatchi Gallery, London

2007

Galerie Rodolphe Janssen, Brussels

Bellwether, New York

2006

Dig Me No Grave, Mike Weiss Gallery, New York

2005

The Parable Show, Grimm/Rosenfeld Gallery, Munich

New Figuration, Gallerie Christina Wilson, Copenhagen

2003

Studio d'Arte Cannaviello, Milan

The Armory Show, Stefan Stux Gallery, New York

Second Seed, One in the Other, London

2000

Carrie Haddad Gallery, Hudson

1998

A Short Show About Something, Red Mill Gallery, Vermont

1997

Grey Days & Dizzy Days, No.5 Temporary Gallery, Merchant City, Glasgow
