= Valija Veščunas-Jansone =

Latvian lawyer

Valija Veščunas-Jansone (1902–1990) was a Latvian lawyer, one of the three women who was awarded the Order of Lāčplēsis. On November 19, 1919, one of the first to cross the Lielupe River during Valka Vashchun's journey, and despite the enemy's overcrowding, took Plani's home where prisoners and trophies were received. She was the head of the women's department of the association "Latvijas Ērgļi".
