= Janssens =

Janssens is a Dutch surname equivalent to Johnson. It is the second most common surname in Belgium, while in the Netherlands, the forms Jansen and Janssen are more common. Notable people with this surname include:

- Abraham Janssens (c. 1573 – 1632), Flemish painter
- A. Cecile J.W. Janssens (1968–2022), Dutch epidemiologist
- Bernard Janssens (1895–?), Belgian racing cyclist
- Cas Janssens (1944–2024), Dutch footballer
- Charles Janssens (1906–1986), Belgian film actor
- Chris Janssens (born 1969), Belgian footballer
- Christophe Janssens (born 1998), Belgian footballer
- Émile Janssens (1902–1989), Belgian general and commander of the Force Publique
- Corneille Janssens (1585–1638), Flemish bishop and founder of Jansenism
- Cornelis Janssens van Ceulen (1593–1661), Dutch portrait painter
- Francis Janssens (1843–1897), Dutch-born Archbishop of New Orleans.
- Franciscus Janssens, General Abbot.
- Frans Janssens (1945–2024), Belgian footballer
- Frans Alfons Janssens, (1865–1924), Belgian biologist who first described chromosomal crossover
- Hieronymus Janssens, Flemish painter from the Baroque
- Jan Janssens (August 1590-after 1650), Flemish Baroque painter
- Jan Willem Janssens (1762–1838), Dutch soldier and statesman
- Jean Janssens (born 1944), Belgian footballer
- Jean-Baptiste Janssens (1889–1964), twenty-seventh Superior General of the Society of Jesus
- Jill Janssens (born 2003), Belgian footballer
- Johann Hermann Janssens (1783–1853), Belgian theologian
- Kevin Janssens (disambiguation), several people
- Ko Janssens (1889–1970), Dutch boxer
- Marcel Janssens (1931–1992), Belgian road bicycle racer
- Mark Janssens (born 1968), Canadian ice hockey forward
- Mathias Janssens (born 1998), Belgian footballer
- Patrick Janssens (born 1956), Belgian politician
- Victor Honoré Janssens (1658–1736), Flemish painter

== See also ==
- Janssen (disambiguation)
