= Janssen =

Janssen may refer to:

== Astronomy ==
- Janssen (lunar crater)
- Janssen (Martian crater)
- Janssen (planet), an exoplanet also known as 55 Cancri e

== Other ==
- Janssen (surname) is a common Dutch surname, cognate of "Johnson"
- Janssen Pharmaceuticals, a Belgian company
  - Janssen Biotech, an American subsidiary
  - Janssen COVID-19 vaccine
- USS Janssen (DE-396), World War II US Navy destroyer escort
- E. Janssen Building, a historic building in Eureka, California

== See also ==
- Jansen (disambiguation)
- Jannsen
- Janssens
