= Jensen Group =

- Type: Private
- Industry: Financial services
- Founded: 1991
- Headquarters: 32 Nevsky Prospect; Saint Petersburg, Russia,
- Key people: Steven Wayne (President)
- Number of employees: >100
- Website: www.jensen.ru

Jensen Group is an investment company of the Russian real estate market. All of the company's efforts are focused on investments in St. Petersburg and the Leningrad region.

== Activity ==
Jensen Group activity is concentrated on:

- Acquisition and development of land and real estate construction.
- Realignment and reconstruction of obsolete industrial objects for their redevelopment and best use.
- Investing in inefficiently used or undervalued assets with good growth potential.

== Assets ==
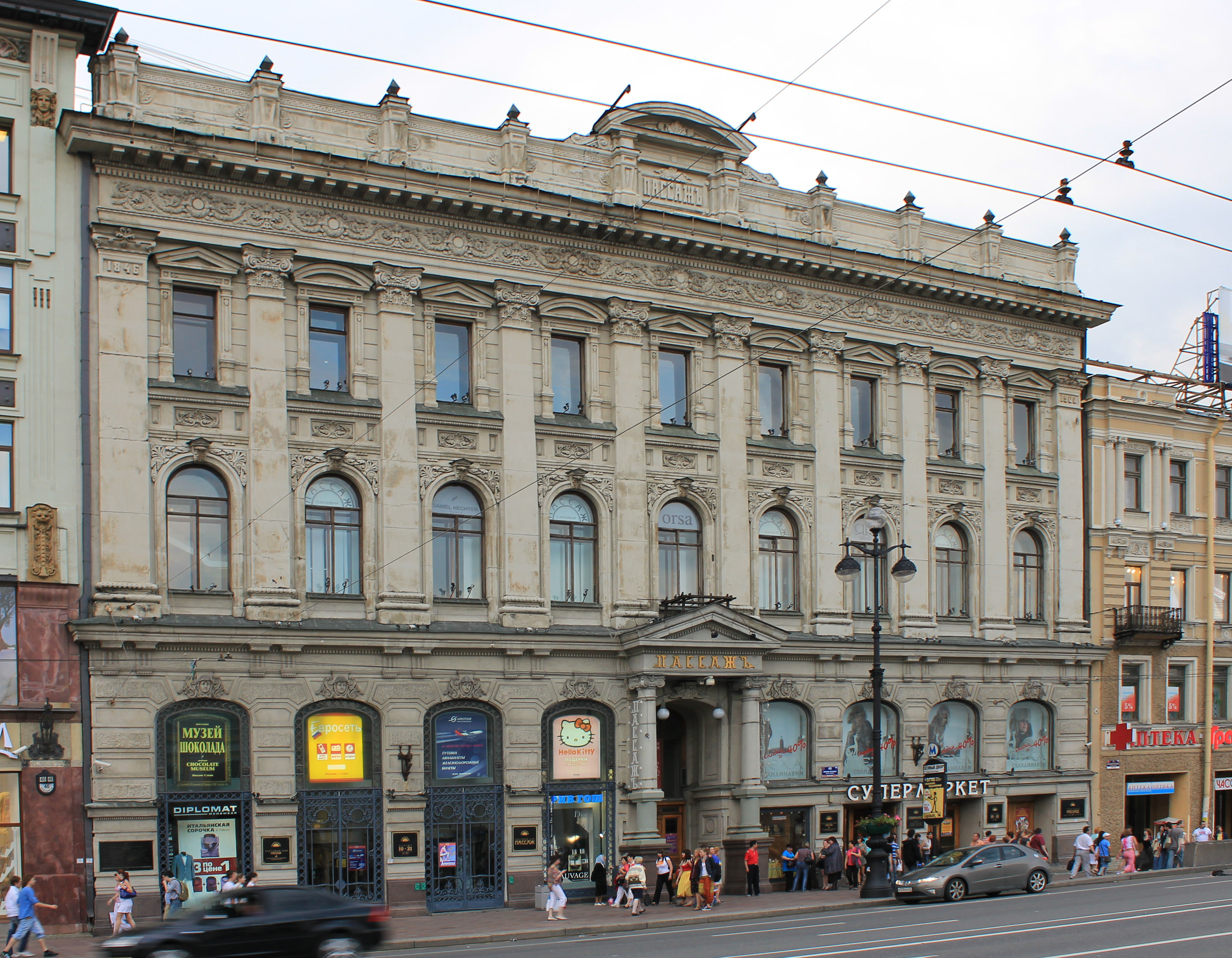
Historic department store "Passage" - the Nevsky Prospect, 48

Jensen Group manages and invests in objects of retail, office, industrial, warehouse and suburban real estate in St. Petersburg.

In September 2011, the VTB Group sold to Jensen Group the historic department store "The Passage" by Nevsky Prospect, 48.

== Funds ==
Jensen Group has had two institutional fund in St. Petersburg. The first (Jensen Russian Real Estate Fund I), with a budget of US$100 million, was established in 2006 and now is closed. Its funds were purchased part of Sestroretsk tools factory, land in Sosnovo and portfolio of trading objects on Nevsky Prospekt, Petrograd side and Sverdlovsaya embankment . Second Foundation (Jensen Russian Real Estate Fund II) was formed in 2008. In January 2011, acquired the business center on the emb. Admiral Makarov, 32, a building of shopping center "Super siva", and in September bought a department store "Passage".
