= Vera Jansone =

Latvian-born American architect (1915–2004)

- Born: Vera Jansone; June 18, 1915; Riga, Latvia
- Died: February 12, 2004 (aged 88); Greenbrae, California, U.S.
- Other name: Vera Jansone-deFisher
- Education: University of Latvia; École des Beaux-Arts; Illinois Institute of Technology
- Occupation: Architect
- Spouse: Emanuel Frederic de Fisher
- Children: 1

Vera Jansone-deFisher (June 18, 1915 – February 12, 2004) was a Latvian-born American architect.

== Personal life ==
In 1952, she married Emanuel Frederic de Fisher and had one daughter, Irina, who eventually became a doctor. Vera and her husband lived in Greenbrae, Marin County, in a house she had designed and built in 1976. Although her work was mainly in large-scale projects and commercial developments, this house, cantilevered over a steep hill, demonstrates the degree to which Jansone was influenced by the International Style.

== List of architectural projects ==
- The Fox Plaza, San Francisco, CA, 1963
- Civic Center, Bosworth, Glen Park, and Balboa Park stations, BART, Bay Area, CA,1964-1968
- Mt. Shasta Mall, Redding, CA, 1973
- Pearl Ridge Shopping Mall, Honolulu, HI, 1974
