= Apraksin Dvor =

Retail area in St. Petersburg, Russia

Coordinates: 59.930678°N 30.327523°E

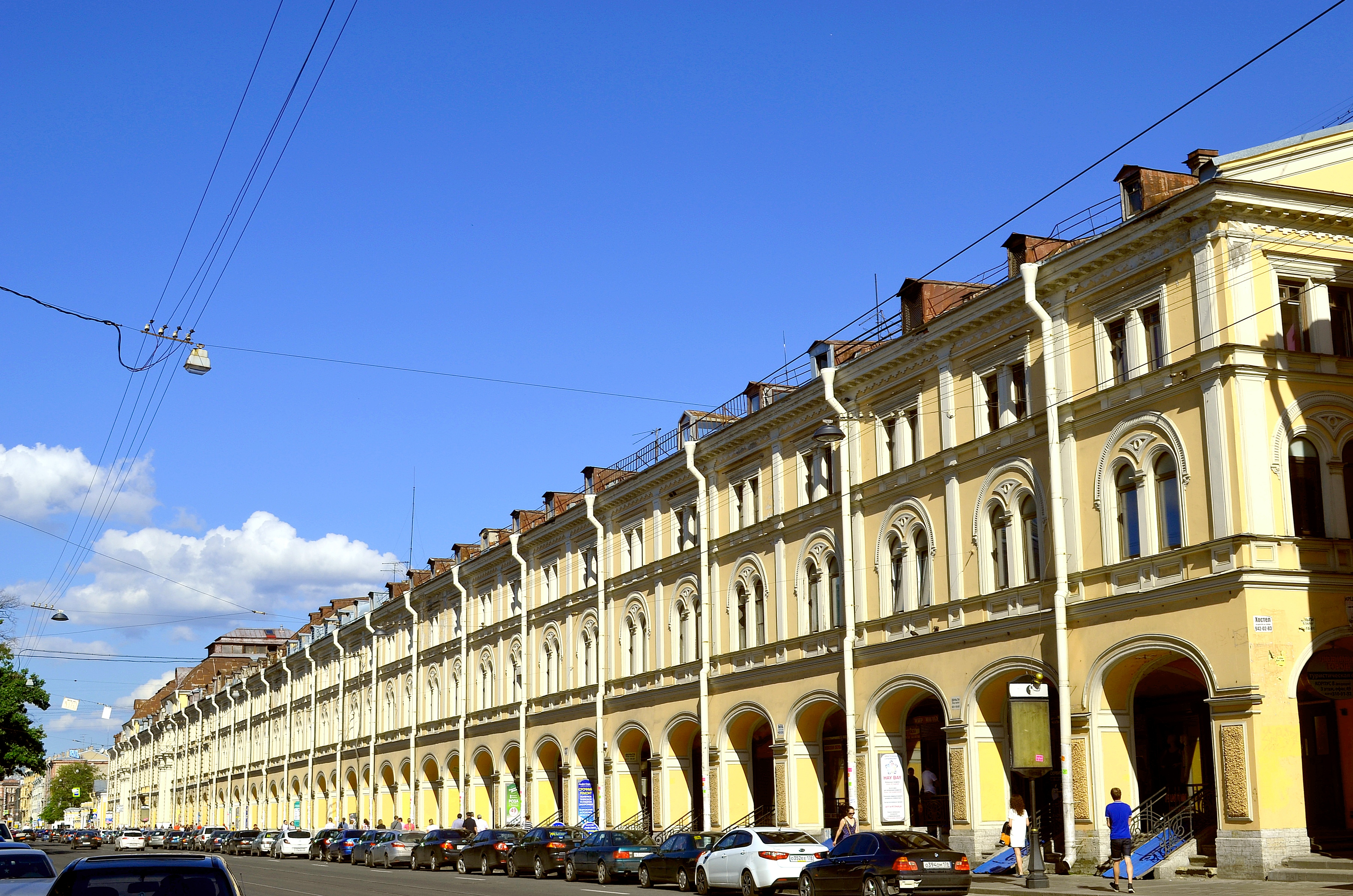
The main frontage on Sadovaya Street dates from the mid-19th century

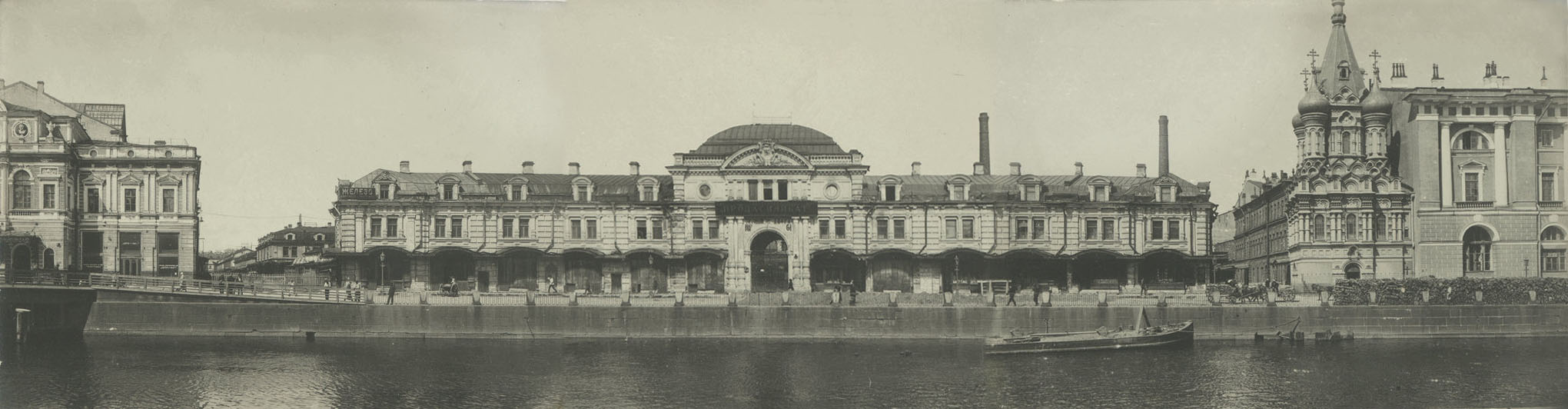
View of Apraksin Dvor from Fontanka Quay in the early 20th century

Apraksin Yard (Apraxin Dvor; Russian: Апраксин Двор) is a market and retail block in Saint Petersburg, Russia, covering 14 hectares (35 acres). It is currently under a massive long-term renovation project. The buildings of Apraksin Dvor stand between Sadovaya Street and the Fontanka River, just southwest of the Alexandrinsky Theatre.

The first market there began in the mid-18th century, deriving its name from Count Apraksin who owned the plot. After a merchant named Shchukin purchased a portion of it, that part became known as Shchukin Dvor. The market buildings were wooden and burnt to the ground in 1782.

A new department store, built to a design by Geronimo Corsini, was opened in the vicinity in 1863. Over the next decade, more than 45 shops were constructed in the area. In 1913, Apraksin Dvor contained more than 500 shops. A further 270 small wholesale enterprises were located in the grounds of Shchukin Dvor.

After the Russian Revolution of 1917, most buildings of Apraksin Dvor were given over to use as depots and warehouses.

By the beginning of the 21st century, Apraksin Dvor was a large city of block of small, downmarket shops facing the street with an open-air market – mostly clothing and accessories – on the inside: an enormous downmarket retail area in the middle of the ever more upscale city center. A long-term renovation plan was instituted; the market stalls were removed in 2008–09 to the Grazhdansky Rynok market on the periphery of the city.
