= Jenson (disambiguation) =

Jenson is a surname and male given name.

Jenson may also refer to:

- Adobe Jenson, a typeface based on the work of printer Nicolas Jenson
- Jenson (band), German rock band
- Jenson Tunnel, railroad tunnel in Oklahoma
- Jenson, Arkansas, a place in Arkansas, United States
- Jenson, Kentucky, United States

== See also ==
- Jens (disambiguation)
- Jensen (disambiguation)
