= Jensen (surname) =

Origin
- Region of origin: Northern Europe

Other names
- Variant form: Jenson

Jensen is a surname of Northern European origin.

The surname Jensen was first found in Holstein, where this family made important contributions toward the development of this district from ancient times. Always prominent in social and political affairs, the family formed alliances with other families within the Feudal System and the nation. Although branches of this family are to be found in the Netherlands and Denmark, German branches were distinct and had their own history from early on.

== List of persons with the surname ==
=== A ===
- Adolf Jensen (1837–1879), composer
- Al Jensen (born 1958)
- Alexis Jensen, American softball player
- Anabel Jensen, American educator and author
- Anders Thomas Jensen (born 1972)
- Anne Elisabet Jensen (born 1951)
- Arnold Jensen, American politician
- Arthur Jensen (actor) (1897–1981)
- Arthur Jensen (1923–2012)
- Ashley Jensen (born 1969), British actress
- Axel Jensen (1932–2003)

=== B ===
- Barry Jensen (born 1954), rugby league footballer
- Benjamin Jensen (born 1975)
- Betty Lou Jensen
- Bhumi Jensen (1983–2004)
- Bjarne Jensen (umpire) (born 1958), Danish cricket umpire
- Bjørg Eva Jensen (born 1960)
- Brian Jensen (footballer born 1968), Danish football defender
- Brian Jensen (footballer born 1975), Danish football goalkeeper

=== C ===
- Captain C. W. Jensen, American policeman
- Carsten Jensen (born 1952), Danish author
- Carter Jensen (born 2003), American baseball player
- Christian Jensen (disambiguation)
- Christoffer Jensen
- Claus Jensen (born 1977), Danish football player
- Cole Jensen (born 2001), American soccer player
- Cornelius Jensen (1814–1886), sea captain and politician
- Curtis Jensen (born 1990), American shot put thrower

=== D ===
- Daniel Jensen (born 1979), Danish footballer
- David Jensen (born 1982), American investment advisor
- Darren Jensen (born 1960)
- David Jensen (born 1950)
- David A. Jensen (born 1965)
- Debra Jensen (born 1958)
- Dennis Jensen (born 1962)
- Derrick Jensen (American football) (1956–2017)
- Derrick Jensen (activist)
- Dick Jensen (1942–2006) Hawaiian entertainer
- Ditte Jensen (born 1980)
- Doron Jensen (born 1958), American restaurateur
- Dorte Juul Jensen
- Dwight Jensen

=== E ===
- Egon Jensen (politician) (1928–1985), Danish politician.
- Eirik Jensen (born 1957), Norwegian drug trafficker and former policeman
- Elaine Jensen (born 1955)
- Elín Metta Jensen (born 1995) Icelandic footballer
- Elwood V. Jensen (1920–2012), American biologist
- Eric Jensen (disambiguation), several people
- Erik Jensen (disambiguation), several people
- Erik Flensted-Jensen (1908–1993)
- Eugen Jensen (1871–1957)
- Eulalie Jensen (1884–1952)
- Eva Skafte Jensen (born 1966), Danish linguist

=== F ===
- Frank Jensen (born 1961)

=== G ===
- Georg Jensen (1866–1935), Danish silversmith
- Gurli Vibe Jensen (1924–2016), Danish missionary, priest and writer
- Gyde Jensen (born 1989), German politician

=== H ===
- J. Hans D. Jensen (1907–1973)
- Hayley Jensen (born 1983)
- Hedvig Antoinette Isabella Eleonore Jensen, known as Elvira Madigan
- Heidi Jensen (born 1966), Danish retired middle-distance runner
- Heike Jensen (born 1965), German volleyball player
- Helene Jensen, Danish curler
- Henning Munk Jensen (born 1947)
- Henrik Wann Jensen (born 1970)
- Holger J. Jensen (1900–1966), Danish painter

=== I ===
- Ingrid Jensen (born 1966)
- Isak Jensen (born 2003), Danish footballer

=== J ===
- Jackie Jensen (1927–1982), American baseball player
- Jacob Jensen
- James A. Jensen (1918–1998)
- Jan Jensen (born 1968), American basketball coach
- Jan Krogh Jensen (1958–1996), Danish gangster
- Jane Jensen (video game designer) (born 1963)
- Jane Jensen (cricketer)
- Jane Jensen (musician) (born 1968)
- Jay E. Jensen (born 1942)
- Jeffrey Jensen (born 1965/1966)
- Jens Jensen (landscape architect) (1860–1951)
- Jens Jensen (politician) (1865–1936)
- Jens Berendt Jensen (born 1940), Danish rower
- Jens Christian Jensen (1928–2013), German art historian and curator
- Jens Fink-Jensen (born 1956)
- Jens Kristian Jensen (1885–1956), Danish gymnast
- Jens S. Jensen (1946–2015), Swedish photographer and writer
- Jesper B. Jensen (born 1977), speedway rider
- Jim Jensen (disambiguation), several people
- Joakim Jensen, Norwegian ice hockey player
- Joanna Jensen (born 1970), British businesswoman
- Johan Jensen (1898–1983), Danish boxer
- Johan Jensen (1859–1925), Danish mathematician
- Johannes Jensen (aviator) (1898–1978), flying ace
- Johannes Vilhelm Jensen (1873–1950)
- John Jensen (disambiguation), several people, also Jon Jensen, Jonathan Jensen and Johnny Jensen
- Jorgen Arendt Jensen, Danish engineer
- Jørgen Jensen (1944–2009)
- Jørgen Christian Jensen
- Judy Jensen (born 1953)

=== K ===
- Kai Jensen (1897–1997), Danish athlete
- Karen Jensen (born 1944), American actress
- Karolina Jensen (born 2003), Danish curler
- Katharina Jensen (born 1986), German politician
- Katrine Evelyn Jensen (born 1996), Danish politician
- Kirsa Jensen, New Zealand girl who disappeared in 1983
- Kirsten Jensen (curler) (born 1952), Danish curler and coach
- Klavs F. Jensen (born 1952), chemical engineer
- Kris Jensen (born 1942), musician

=== L ===
- Larsen Jensen (born 1985)
- Lasse Jensen, professor of chemistry
- Leland Jensen (1914–1996)
- Leslie Jensen (1892–1964)
- Louise Jensen (1971–1994), Danish murder victim
- Luke Jensen (born 1966), American tennis player

=== M ===
- Magnus Georg Jensen (born 1995), Danish politician
- Marcus Jensen (born 1972), American baseball player and coach
- Maren Jensen (born 1956), American model and actress
- Marie-Louise Jensen (born 1964), English author
- Mark Jensen (born 1976), American football player
- Marlin K. Jensen (born 1942), LDS church historian
- Martin Jensen (disambiguation), several people
- Merrill Jensen (1905–1980), American historian
- Michael C. Jensen (born 1939), economist
- Michael Jensen (racing driver) (born 1975), Danish racing driver
- Michael Jepsen Jensen (born 1992), speedway rider
- Mikkel Jensen (footballer born 1977)
- Mikkel Jensen (racing driver) (born 1994), Danish racing driver
- Morten Jensen (disambiguation)
- Murphy Jensen (born 1968)

=== N ===
- Nash Jensen (born 1999), American football player
- Nicholas Jensen (born 1989), Danish ice hockey player
- Nick Jensen (born 1990), Danish ice hockey player
- Nicklas Jensen (born 1993), Danish ice hockey player
- Niclas Jensen (born 1974), Danish footballer and football agent
- Nicolaj Jensen (born 1994), gamer
- Niels Peter Jensen (1802–1846), Danish composer and musician
- Nils Riddervold Jensen (1863–1938), Norwegian politician

=== O ===
- Olivia Jensen (born 1993), Indonesian actress and model
- Otto Jensen (bishop) (1856–1918), Norwegian Lutheran bishop and politician

=== P ===
- Patrik Jensen (born 1969), Swedish guitarist
- Paul Hilmar Jenson (1930–2004), Norwegian philatelist
- Peter Jensen (bishop) (born 1943), Australian Anglican theologian and academic
- Peter Skov-Jensen (born 1971), Danish footballer and goalkeeper
- Peter Vindahl Jensen (born 1998), Danish footballer
- Phillip Jensen, Australian Anglican cleric
- Ploypailin Mahidol Jensen (born 1981), American pianist
- Poul Jensen (footballer born 1899) (1899–1991), Danish footballer
- Poul Jensen (footballer born 1934) (1934–2000), Danish footballer

=== R ===
- Rasmus Jensen (priest) (died 1620), Danish Lutheran priest
- Rasmus Jensen (speedway rider) (born 1993), Danish motorcycle rider
- Richard A. Jensen (1934–2014), American theologian
- Richard J. Jensen (born 1941), American historian
- Roald Jensen (1943–1987), Norwegian footballer
- Robert Jensen (disambiguation), several people
- Rod Jensen (born 1979), Australian rugby league footballer
- Roger Jensen (1933–2001), American photographer
- Ronald Björn Jensen (1936–2025), American mathematician
- Roxanne Jensen, American politician from North Dakota
- Roy C. Jensen (1909–2011), American farmer and politician
- Ryan Jensen (born 1991), NFL player

=== S ===
- Scott Jensen (Minnesota politician) (born 1954), American politician
- Scott Jensen (Wisconsin politician) (born 1960), American politician
- Shelley Jensen, American television director and producer
- Sirikitiya Jensen (born 1985), Thai royal
- Siv Jensen (born 1969), leader of the Norwegian Progress Party
- Søren Gade Jensen (born 1963), Danish politician and Defence Minister
- Sririta Jensen (born 1981), Thai model and actress
- Steve Jensen (1955–2022), ice hockey player

=== T ===
- Thit Jensen (1876–1957), Danish writer
- Thomas Jensen (disambiguation)
- Tine Jensen (born 1957), Norwegian psychologist
- Tobias Jensen (born 2004), Danish basketballer
- Todd Jensen, American bass guitarist
- Tomas Villum Jensen (born 1971), Danish actor and film director
- Tully Jensen, American model and actress

=== U ===
- Uffe Ellemann-Jensen (1941–2022), Danish minister of foreign affairs

=== V ===
- Valther Jensen (1888–1982), Danish athlete
- Vernon K. Jensen (1912–1982), American veterinarian and politician
- Viggo Jensen (disambiguation), several people
- Viktor Jensen (born 1987), Icelandic/British race car driver

=== W ===
- Whitney Jensen (born 1992), American ballet dancer
- Wilhelm Jensen (1837–1911), German writer and poet
- William B. Jensen (1948–2024), American chemist and chemical historian
- Woody Jensen (1907–2001), American college baseball coach

== Fictional characters ==
- Clay Jensen, a character in the novel and series 13 Reasons Why
- Adam Jensen, a character in the video game series Deus Ex
- Molly Jensen, lead female character played by Demi Moore in the 1990 film Ghost

== See also ==
- Jensen (disambiguation)
