= Fyfield, Hampshire =

Village and parish in Hampshire, England

Coordinates: 51.219270°N 1.578755°W

Fyfield
- Village
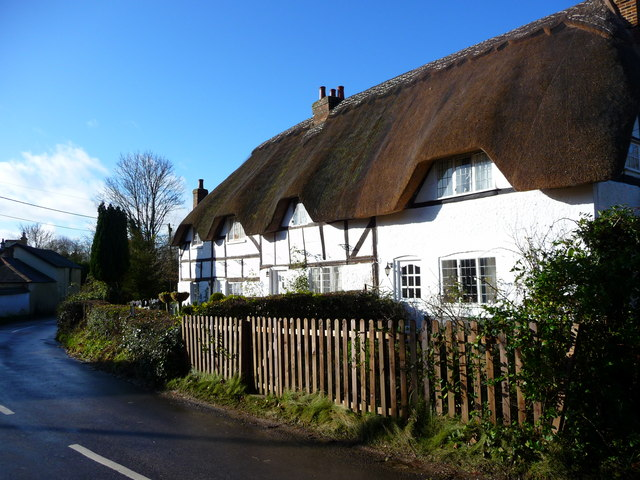
- Thatched cottage in the village

- Location within Hampshire
- Area: 5.233 km^{2} (2.020 sq mi)
- Population: 429 (2021 Census )
  - Density: 81.97 km2
- OS grid reference: SU2951646759
- District: Test Valley
- Shire county: Hampshire
- Region: South East
- Country: England
- Sovereign state: United Kingdom
- Post town: Andover
- Postcode district: SP11
- Dialling code: 01264
- Police: Hampshire and Isle of Wight
- Fire: Hampshire and Isle of Wight
- Ambulance: South Central
- UK Parliament: Romsey and Southampton North

Fyfield is a village and civil parish in Test Valley, a borough in west Hampshire, England. The village is located in close proximity to the villages of Thruxton, Kimpton, Appleshaw and Weyhill. The closest major population hub is that of the town of Andover, Hampshire. Fyfield is located very close to the Hampshire-Wiltshire border, which also marks the regional border of South East England (that includes Fyfield) and South West England. Some near by settlements in Wiltshire include: Ludgershall and Tidworth. Part of Redenham Park lays within the parish.

== Transport and road network ==
The village is almost entirely located on Fyfield Road, this is a 2 lane road that spans the village, however the road narrows about halfway through the village. Within the area of the parish there are also the roads Fyfield Lane and Privet Lane, these both connect to Fyfield Road in the village, and both also come off of the A342, which forms the eastern border of the parish. The village is also located in proximity of the A303, this can be accessed via Thruxton or Weyhill.

=== Bus network ===
Although there are 3 sets of bus stops in the village, as of 2024 no bus service services these stops.

Geographically there are two sets of bus stops located along the A342 in the parish, these being 'The Beeches' and 'East Lodge'. However, Stagecoach lists these as Appleshaw stops. According to Stagecoach there are two bus stops for Fyfield, 'Prebbles Lodge' and 'White House', these are both located in the civil parish of Appleshaw. Salisbury Reds lists different names for some of these stops. 'The Beeches' is listed as 'Redenham Park House', and 'White House' is listed as 'Fyfield Lane' NW-bound (towards Ludgershall and Salisbury), and as 'Appleshaw Turn' SE-bound (towards Andover). All of these stops are serviced by the Activ8 Salisbury-Andover route operated by both Salisbury Reds and Stagecoach South.

The only other service that comes close to Fyfield is the Stagecoach number 5 to Andover. This services stops in Thruxton and Weyhill.

=== Rail ===
There are no railway stations in the parish, however there is the track of the unused Ludgershall branch line, branching from Andover and ending in Ludgershall. Historically this track had a station in Weyhill.

The closest in-use railway stations are those of Andover railway station and Grateley railway station. These are both located on the West of England line, and are operated by South Western Railway (SWR). Half-hourly trains operate from Andover to London Waterloo via Basingstoke.

== Places and businesses in Fyfield ==
Fyfield has a church, officially: St Nicholas, Church of Fyfield. This church was listed in the Domesday Book of 1086; its current form is believed to date from the 14th Century.

In the village there is the Andover Aikido Club for martial arts.

== Education ==
=== Primary education ===
The village has a joint Primary School in Kimpton, officially: Kimpton, Thruxton and Fyfield C of E Primary School. The Village is also in proximity of Appleshaw which has its own primary school: St Peter's C of E Primary School.

=== Secondary education ===
Fyfield sits in the catchment area of Harrow Way Community School, with a school bus which picks up in the village, as well as the other neighbouring villages of Thruxton and Appleshaw. Some students also choose to go to John Hanson Community School via the Activ8 bus.

=== Further education ===
Currently Andover College can be accessed via the Activ8 bus. Students can take the Activ8 to Andover bus station, and from there take a bus to Winchester: the 75 is normal service, with the 74 running directly to the college, and the 73 running to the college via Sparsholt College.

== Politics ==
At the 2024 general election in the UK, Fyfield was part of the Romsey and Southampton North constituency, whose MP is Caroline Nokes of the Conservative Party. Prior to the 2024 general election, Fyfield was a part of the North West Hampshire constituency.
