= Bruce Lamb =

English cricketer

Personal information
- Born: 25 August 1878; Andover, Hampshire, England
- Died: 21 March 1932 (aged 53); Andover, Hampshire, England
- Batting: Right-handed

Domestic team information
- Years: Team
- 1898–1901: Hampshire

Career statistics
Competition	First-class
Matches	4
Runs scored	29
Batting average	4.14
100s/50s	–/–
Top score	8
Catches/stumpings	2/–
- Source: Cricinfo, 8 January 2010

Bruce Lamb JP (25 August 1878 — 21 March 1932) was an English first-class cricketer and solicitor.

The son of Thomas Lamb, he was born at Andover in August 1878. He was educated at Marlborough College, becoming a solicitor for the family firm Lamb and Son shortly after completing his education. A club cricketer for Andover Cricket Club, he made his debut in first-class cricket for Hampshire against Yorkshire at Southampton in the 1898 County Championship. He made two further first-class appearances in 1898, against Cambridge University and Leicestershire. Three years later, he made a final first-class appearance against the touring South Africans. In his four first-class matches, he scored 29 runs at an average of 4.14. In addition to playing cricket, Lamb also played football for Andover F.C.

Lamb served in the Royal Wiltshire Yeomanry, being appointed as a second lieutenant in April 1908, with promotion to captain following in April 1911. He served with the Royal Wiltshire Yeomanry during the First World War, during the course of which he was promoted to the rank of temporary major in October 1915. Following the war, he was conferred with the Territorial Decoration in May 1919. Prior to the war, Lamb had served as a deputy coroner for Andover District, and was a justice of the peace. He was active within civic life in Andover, being elected to the Town Council in 1907 and was made an alderman in 1923. He was formerly the chairman of his local Conservative association.

Lamb had been unwell for many years, suffering from a severe and progressive form of heart disease, coupled with unstable mental health. Having failed to return home from his office on 21 March 1932, his wife sent a clerk to his office to check on him. There, he was discovered dead, with the gas supply to the fire in his office having been turned on. An inquest held a few days later returned a verdict of "suicide while of unsound mind".
