= Catherine Merridale =

British writer and historian

Catherine Merridale FBA
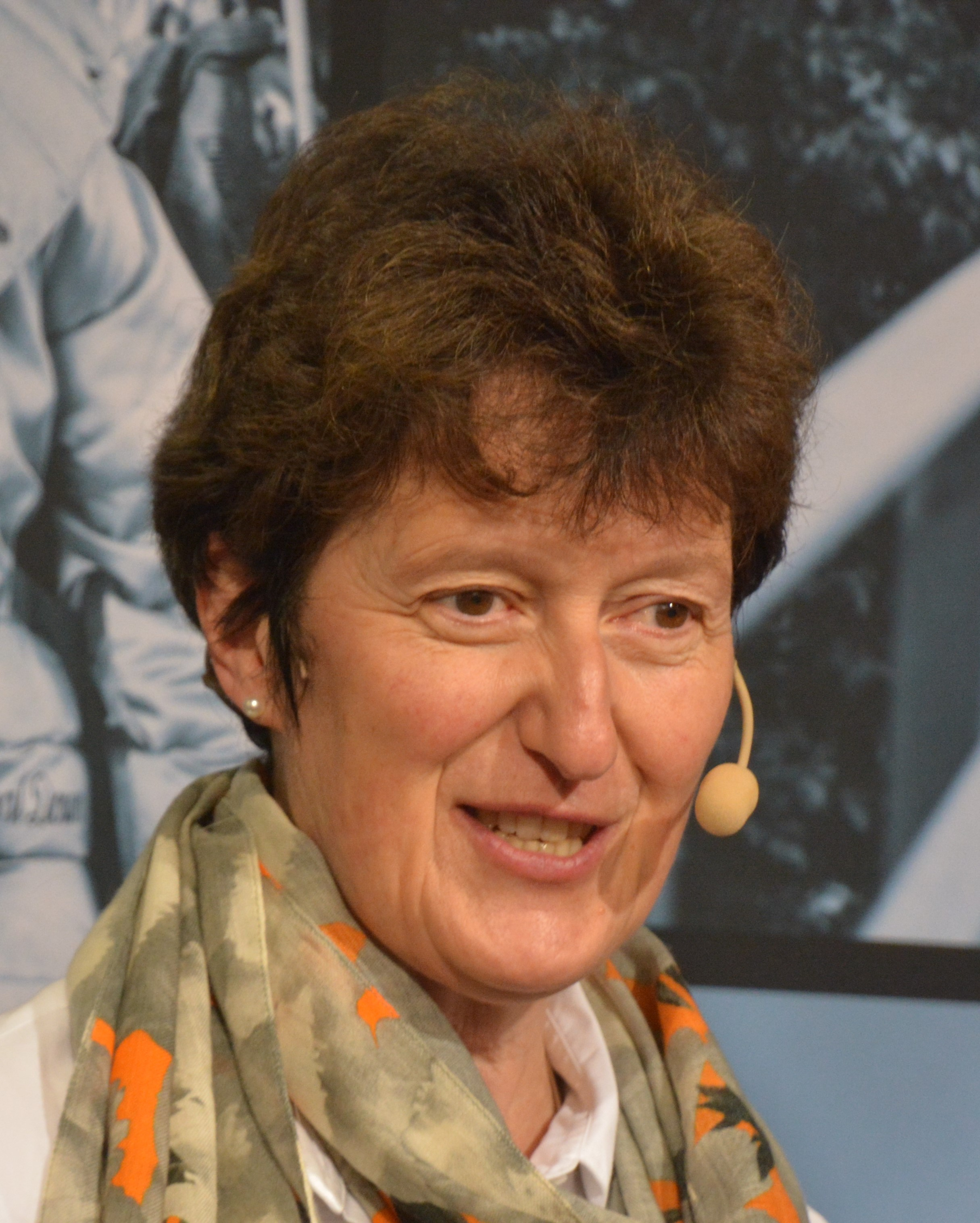
- Merridale at the Göteborg Book Fair in Sweden, 2017
- Born: 12 October 1959 (age 66)
- Citizenship: United Kingdom

Academic background
- Education: King's College, Cambridge; University of Birmingham
- Thesis: The Communist Party in Moscow 1925-1932 (1987)
- Doctoral advisor: R. W. Davies

Academic work
- Discipline: History
- Sub-discipline: Russian history; Stalinism; contemporary history; oral history
- Institutions: Queen Mary, University of London; Institute of Historical Research, University of London

Catherine Anne Merridale, FBA (born 12 October 1959) is a British writer and historian with a special interest in Russian history.

== Early life and education ==
Merridale was born on 12 October 1959 to Philip and Anne Merridale. She was educated at Andover Grammar School, a state school in Andover, Hampshire, and at Cricklade College, a further education college that is also in Andover. She studied history at King's College, Cambridge, graduating with a first class Bachelor of Arts (BA) degree in 1982. She continued her studies at the Centre for Russian and East European Studies of the University of Birmingham, and completed her Doctor of Philosophy (PhD) degree under the supervision of R. W. Davies in 1987. Her doctoral thesis was titled "The Communist Party in Moscow 1925-1932".

== Academic career ==
Merridale was Professor of Contemporary History at Queen Mary, University of London from 2004 to 2014. She has been a senior research fellow at the Institute of Historical Research, University of London, since her retirement from full-time academia in 2014.

=== Research interests ===
In an interview with The Independent, Merridale recalls how she became interested in Russia and its past. She began studying Russian in school and first visited the country at the age of 18. She said of her first impression of Russia, "Going from the then ghastly Soviet airport, everything in Moscow was grey and cold and hard. Suddenly in the middle of the city were these golden cupolas and enormous redbrick walls with peculiar swallowtail battlement pattern that didn’t look Russian, but did at the same time." When she began work on her higher degrees, Merridale spent a year living in Moscow and observing the changes occurring during that time. In another interview with Waterstones.com, Merridale summarises her perspective of Russian history, "my message is that we have to take each generation of Russian leaders as they are and not keep assuming that Russia is fated to follow a special path and will always be the same. That there is a Russian destiny."

== Later career ==
Having retired from her academic career, Merridale became a freelance writer in 2014. She has written for the London Review of Books, the New Statesman, The Independent, The Guardian, and the Literary Review. She has also contributed to BBC Radio. The author has spoken out publicly about the issues of publishing books in the field of history. There is much more pressure to publish shorter articles than full-length books, a "great shame" according to Merridale, author of multiple history books.

Merridale's debut fiction novel Moscow Underground was published in 2025. Moscow Underground was named one of the best historical fiction books of 2025 by The Sunday Times.

== Selected works ==
=== Non-fiction ===
- Merridale, Catherine (1990). Moscow Politics and the Rise of Stalin: The Communist Party in the Capital, 1925–32. New York: St. Martin's Press. ISBN 0312047991. OCLC 21337606.
- Merridale, Catherine (2001). Night of Stone: Death and Memory in Twentieth-Century Russia. New York: Viking. ISBN 0670894745. OCLC 44573540.
- Merridale, Catherine (2006). Culture and Combat Motivation. London: Sage Publications. OCLC 67636955.
- Merridale, Catherine (2006). Ivan's War: life and death in the Red Army, 1939–1945. New York: Metropolitan Books. ISBN 0805074554. OCLC 60671899.
- Merridale, Catherine (2013). Red fortress: history and illusion in the Kremlin. New York: Metropolitan Books, Henry Volt and Company. ISBN 978-0805086805. OCLC 827256860.
- Merridale, Catherine (2016). Lenin on the Train. UK: Penguin. ISBN 978-0141979939. OCLC 944462944.

=== Novels ===
- Moscow Underground (2025)

== Honours ==
- UK Heinemann Award for Literature for Night of Stone
- New York Military Affairs Symposium's Arthur Goodzeit Prize for best book on Military History for Ivan's War
- Pushkin House Book Prize for Red Fortress
- Wolfson History Prize for Red Fortress
- She was elected a Fellow of the British Academy, the United Kingdom's national academy for the humanities and the social sciences, in 2016.
