= John Hanson Community School =

Location
- Floral Way; Andover, Hampshire, SP10 3RH; England
- Coordinates: 51.2052°N 1.5041°W

Information
- Type: Community school
- Motto: Inspire, Care, Succeed
- Established: 1569
- Local authority: Hampshire
- Department for Education URN: 116405 Tables
- Ofsted: Reports
- Headteacher: Erin Sudds
- Gender: Coeducational
- Age: 11 to 16
- Enrolment: 983 as of April 2022
- Website: http://www.jhanson.hants.sch.uk/

John Hanson Community School is a coeducational community secondary school, located in Andover, in the English county of Hampshire.

It was formerly known as Andover Grammar School, which dates back to the 16th century and is the oldest school in Andover.

It is administered by Hampshire County Council which coordinates the schools admissions. The school offers GCSEs and BTECs as programmes of study for pupils.

== History ==
Until the late sixteenth century, schooling in Andover was limited to a nunnery and a priory offering education to a limited number of boys and girls. Winchester college graduate John Hanson sought to change this by leaving a £200 endowment in his will, to found a new free school for the children of Andover. Hanson died in 1571; this date is often cited as the year that the school opened, however town records show that the first headmaster Anthony Twitchin was not appointed until 1582, His initials and the year were inscribed in a foundation stone of the original school building; this stone has been moved to each subsequent site and can be found in the reception area of the current school.

Other benefactors included local tradesmen and prominent local families, who made donations of money and resources in the early days of the school. The surnames of Richard Kemys, Richard Blake and Hugh Marshall (the school's second headmaster) were used alongside that of John Hanson as the names for the school's "houses" until the early 21st century.

The original school opened in 1582 in the grounds of St Mary's Church, accessed via Andover's famous Norman arch. It was extended in 1618 and rebuilt in 1773, before being demolished in 1847, when the church itself was demolished and replaced with the current church. The site of John Hanson's "Andover Free School" is now a shrubbery.

In 1845 the school was renamed Andover Grammar School and Martha Gale, a resident of Church Close, donated a house to provide a new site for the school, as well as money for development. The house is now Andover Museum, which was opened by former pupil Lord Denning in 1981.

In 1925 the school moved to a new purpose-built site on Weyhill Road, with the entrance in Croye Close. An open-air swimming pool was built in the 1930s, and in the 1950s the school was extended with state-of-the-art science labs and a new dining hall, with integral kitchens and an impressive theatrical stage.

In 1974, the school was renamed John Hanson School in honour of its founder. According to a promotional brochure for the town published in the early 1970s, the John Hanson name had originally been intended for the new college, which was ultimately designated Cricklade College. More new buildings, known as the A Block, were added, providing art studios, a large sports hall and well equipped home economics classrooms. Pre-fabricated huts were installed, as the school expanded. In 2001, now renamed John Hanson Community School, the school moved to its current site on Floral Way. The Croye Close buildings were demolished and the site is now a small housing estate, with roads named after Lord Denning and Richard Kemys.

== Notable former pupils ==
=== Andover Grammar School ===
- Frank Barnaby, nuclear physicist and Director of the Stockholm International Peace Research Institute
- Cyril Berry, author
- Chris Britton, the lead guitarist of The Troggs
- Alfred Denning, lawyer and judge
- Norman Denning, Vice Admiral of the Royal Navy
- Catherine Merridale, historian
- Richard Trowbridge (1920-2003), 25th Governor of Western Australia

=== John Hanson Community School ===
- Brodi Hughes (born 2004), footballer for Chelsea F.C.
