= George Bull (cricketer) =

English cricketer

Personal information
- Full name: George Bull
- Role: Bowler

Domestic team information
- Years: Team
- 1900: Hampshire

Career statistics
Competition	First-class
Matches	2
Runs scored	12
Batting average	6.00
100s/50s	0/0
Top score	10
Balls bowled	36
Wickets	0
Bowling average	–
5 wickets in innings	–
10 wickets in match	–
Best bowling	–
Catches/stumpings	0/–
- Source: Cricinfo, 2 January 2009

George Bull was an English first-class cricketer. He was a fast bowler.

Bull made two first-class appearances for Hampshire in the 1900 County Championship against Yorkshire and Essex. On debut against Yorkshire at The Circle, Hull, Bull started the match as a substitute fielder for Yorkshire after two of their players were late arriving; he was only on the field for ten minutes but took the catch to dismiss his own captain, Charles Robson, in Schofield Haigh's first over. Batting at number 11, he ended Hampshire's first-innings of 128 unbeaten on 0, while in Yorkshire's first-innings total of 460, he bowled six wicketless overs. In Hampshire's second-innings of 61 all out, he was dismissed for 2 runs by Wilfred Rhodes, with Yorkshire winning by an innings and 271 runs. Against Essex at the County Ground, Leyton, Hampshire had been playing with ten men until Bull arrived on the final day. Batting in their second-innings, he scoring 10 runs before he was dismissed for 10 by Bill Reeves, as Essex won the match by 206 runs.

Bull played club cricket for Andover. In a match against Newbury on 14 July 1900, he took all ten wickets in the first innings, finishing with figures of 10 for 45.
