= Cyril Berry =

British newspaper editor

C J J Berry
- Born: Cyril J J Berry; 17 April 1918; Andover, Hampshire, England
- Died: 4 November 2002 (aged 84)
- Occupations: Author and homebrew circle founder
- Writing career
- Notable works: First Steps in Winemaking, 1960

Cyril J J Berry (17 April 1918 – 4 November 2002) was a writer known for his book First Steps in Winemaking, which has sold more than three million copies worldwide.

== Homebreewing ==
Throughout the first half of the 20th century, homebrewing in Britain was limited by taxation, prohibition, and scarcity of ingredients during wartime. One of the earliest modern attempts to regulate private production was the Inland Revenue Act 1880 (43 & 44 Vict. c. 20) in the United Kingdom; this required a 5-shilling homebrewing licence. In the UK, in April 1963, the UK Chancellor of the Exchequer, Reggie Maudling removed the need for the 1880 brewing licence.

Following the end of sugar rationing in 1953 after the Second World War, and the repeal of the brewing licence, interest in brewing at home started to thrive. Berry was instrumental in this phenomenon as one of the founders of the first British amateur winemakers' circle in Andover, Hampshire and three other English counties in the 1950s. The movement grew quickly from these beginnings.

== Career ==
By 1961 over 100 wine circles operated in the UK. A 1962 estimate of membership put numbers at 30,000 in the UK. Berry was one of the founders of the National Association of Winemakers (UK) and served as its first chairman from 1960 to 1967. In 1963 he was instrumental in establishing the Winemaking National Guild of Judges (now National Guild of Wine and Beer Judges) and was one of its early chairmen.

Berry also produced the Amateur Winemaker magazine and published First Steps in Winemaking, 130 New Winemaking recipes, and Home Brewed Beers and Stouts.

Prior to his retirement in 1967, Berry worked as a newspaper editor, most notably for the Andover Advertiser. Berry served as mayor of Andover in 1972–73. He was an alumnus of the Andover Grammar School and published Old Andover, a collection of local photos and records dating from 1840 to 1960.

Berry died in Nerja, Spain, in 2002.

== First Steps in Winemaking ==
First Steps in Winemaking is notable as a resource for winemaking technique and recipe and is still in print following its original publication in 1960. It includes methods for traditional grape wines, as well as "country wines" using seasonal fruit and vegetables, tinned and dried ingredients, and commercial juices. It is the source for the simplest common method for measuring alcohol by volume in wine:

- $ABV = (Starting SG - Final SG)/7.36$

== Publications ==
First Steps in Winemaking, ISBN 978-1-85486-139-9

130 New Winemaking Recipes, ISBN 978-0-900841-63-7

Home-Brewed Beers and Stouts, ISBN 978-1-85486-123-8
