= Sparsholt College =

Agricultural college in Sparsholt, England

Sparsholt College Group
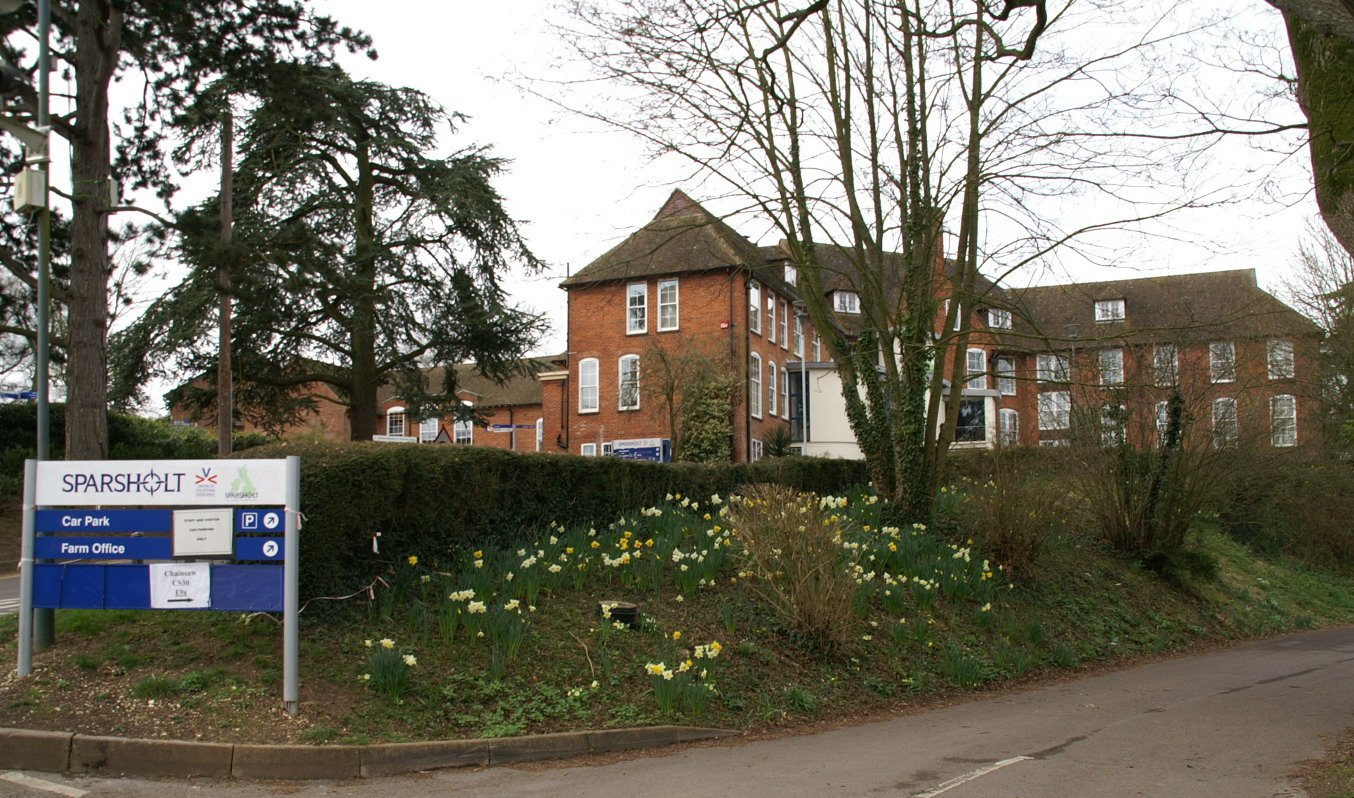

Location
- Westley Lane; Sparsholt, Hampshire, SO21 2NF; England; 51.084756°N 1.392444°W

Information
- Type: Further education college
- Established: 1899
- Local authority: Hampshire County Council
- Department for Education URN: 130698 Tables
- Ofsted: Reports
- Head teacher: Julie Milburn
- Gender: Coeducational
- Age: 14+
- Website: http://www.sparsholt.ac.uk/

Sparsholt College, formerly also known as Hampshire College of Agriculture, is a Further Education (FE) and Higher Education (HE) college located at Sparsholt near Winchester, with a secondary campus in Andover, both in Hampshire in the south of England. The college provides courses from sixth form to degree level.

The college covers primarily countryside-based subjects including Agriculture, Engineering, Fishery Studies, Equine Studies, Forestry and Woodland Management, Game and Wildlife Management, Horticulture, Sport and Outdoor Education and Animal Management. There are currently more than 1900 full-time and 3000 part-time students including around 450 at HE level.

== Origins and history ==
The college originated as Hampshire's first Farm School, set up by the County Council at Lower Mill Farm, Old Basing near Basingstoke in 1899. This replaced some peripatetic agricultural training using horse drawn vans which had been operating since 1891.

It moved to its present site at Westley Farm, Sparsholt in 1914. The County Council purchased part of what was then a larger Westley Farm the previous year, Lower Mill Farm being leased and no longer adequate for the expanding curriculum.

Higher Education at the college began in 1983 at HND level with Fishery Studies. Current BSc(Hons) degrees include Animal Management and Garden Design.

Under the terms of the Further and Higher Education Act 1992, the college became independent of Hampshire County Council in 1993.

The college merged with Cricklade College, Andover in 2007. This is now known as Andover College.

In August 2015 it was announced with partner Ecotricity they will be building an Anaerobic digester that will take grass-cutting from local farms and supply the resulting gas to the grid with an overall aim of training students in the technology.

The long-running BBC Radio 4 program Gardeners' Question Time has a base at the college known as the Potting Shed, and a demonstration garden. It runs annual open days at the college.

== Alumni ==
Some prominent former students of the college include:

- Charlie Dimmock - T.V. presenter and gardener.
- Tom Hart Dyke - horticulturist, plant hunter and designer of the World Garden of Plants.
