= Winton Community Academy =

Location
- London Road; Andover, Hampshire, SP10 2PS; England; 51.2099°N 1.4646°W

Information
- Type: Academy
- Department for Education URN: 138920 Tables
- Ofsted: Reports
- Principal: Myles Preston
- Gender: Mixed
- Age: 11 to 16
- Website: https://www.liftwinton.org/

Winton Community Academy (formerly Winton School) is a mixed secondary school located in Andover in the English county of Hampshire.

== History ==
The school converted to academy status on 1 November 2012 and was renamed Winton Community Academy. It had been known as Winton School, and was a community school under the direct control of Hampshire County Council. The school continues to coordinate with Hampshire County Council for admissions, but has been sponsored by the Academies Enterprise Trust since 2012.

== Academic standards ==
This table shows the proportion of pupils achieving 5 GCSEs A-C (including English and Maths). Data is taken from the November 2015 datasets held by the Department for Education, as indicated in the footnotes. School and College Performance Tables.

Academy Name	2011	2012	2013	2014	2015	OFSTED Grade	DfE Warning or Pre Warning
Winton Community Academy	27%	40%	36%	33%	26%	Inadequate	25 Nov 2013
National maintained school results	59%	59%	60%	57%	56%		

Cells coloured red represent 5 GCSE A-C (including English and Maths) results which are below the minimum standards expected by the Government floor target, OFSTED grades which indicate standards need to be improved or Department for Education letters stating that standards are 'unacceptably low.' Cells in darker grey indicate schools which have left AET or data which arose for periods of time before or after the schools were part of AET.

Winton's first set of results as an AET Academy saw 36% of students achieve 5 GCSES A-C (including English and Maths). As this figure fell short of the minimum standards outlined in the government’s floor target of 40% 5 GCSEs A-C (including English and Maths), the headteacher Chris McShane, resigned. The academy was placed into Special Measures by OFSTED, which stated that:

students make inadequate progress in English and mathematics and most other subjects because of inadequate teaching. Achievement is inadequate because GCSE results are below that of other schools nationally, and students do not make the progress that they are capable of.

In November 2013 Lord Nash, on behalf of the Department for Education, issued a Pre-Warning Notice to the Academies Enterprise Trust stating that:

the Secretary of State considers that the standards of performance at Winton Community Academy are unacceptably low and are likely to remain so unless he intervenes.

The Academies Enterprise Trust appointed Sharon Watts as interim principal to lead on improvements at the academy. But exam results fell still further in summer 2014, dropping to 33% 5 GCSEs A-C (including English and Maths). In the Autumn of 2014 Nathan Thomas was appointed as the new principal and led the academy through a successful OFSTED inspection. Thomas stated:

Winton is making the first footsteps to the outstanding school the community deserves. There’s a real momentum in the Academy with absolute commitment from all stakeholders to rapidly get the school back to being a centre of academic excellence in the community.

The students are the politest and most courteous children I have ever worked with, the staff are determined to get the school to ‘good’ by September next year, which will mean the academy is improving every day

In order to bring about improvement the academy introduced new teaching techniques, including days when students did not use pens. There was also a focus on introducing house captains and getting students more involved in the running of the school.

However concerns remained about how the academy was doing and so in April 2015 Sir George Young, the outgoing MP, and his successor Kit Malthouse met with Ian Comfort, the head of Academies Enterprise Trust in order to stress the importance of raising standards at Winton Community College. Sir George stated:

the school recognises that it has to raise its game. The school has much going for it – small classes and motivated teachers – and the predicted outcomes for this year’s exam results are a significant improvement on last year.

In the summer of 2015, despite well publicised efforts to improve attendance, optimistic predictions and claims by OFSTED that standards were improving, Academy results fell further and only 26% of pupils achieved 5GCSEs A-C (including English and Maths). This meant that Winton Community Academy remained, for the third year in a row, below the Government minimum standards for schools (known as the 'floor target')

== Extracurricular life ==
In 2014 the academy put on a performance of Dick Wittington funding its expansion of the arts through charity activities such as bag packing at local supermarkets. Although in Sept 2013 a fire caused serious damage to Winton Academy, this did not prevent the academy going on to open a new Sports and Rugby centre. During 2015 there was a significant drive to improve library facilities and Dame Lucy Jeanne Neville-Rolfe visited the school to give advice on business and entrepreneurship.

== The role of the sponsor ==
Academies Enterprise Trust support for Academies at the local level is led by the AET Regional Director of Education (known as a RDE). The 2014 OFSTED report about AET explained that ‘some academy leaders said that there was too much variability in the support and challenge offered by Regional Directors employed by AET.'. In September 2015 an Ofsted inspection at Winton Academy noted that:

The Assistant Regional Director is a frequent visitor to the academy, as is the Regional Director of Education for AET. They hold the Principal to account tightly

Leaders and managers are not taking effective action towards the removal of special measures.

During 2015 the RDE for Winton Community Academy was Elizabeth (Libby) Nicholas. Libby Nicholas was previously a deputy headteacher at an Independent girls school, Sutton High School and then an interim headteacher at independent girls school South Hampstead High School during the summer term in 2013. In December 2015 it was announced that she was leaving Academies Enterprise Trust in order to join Reach4, a new Multi Academy Trust.
