= Rookwood School =

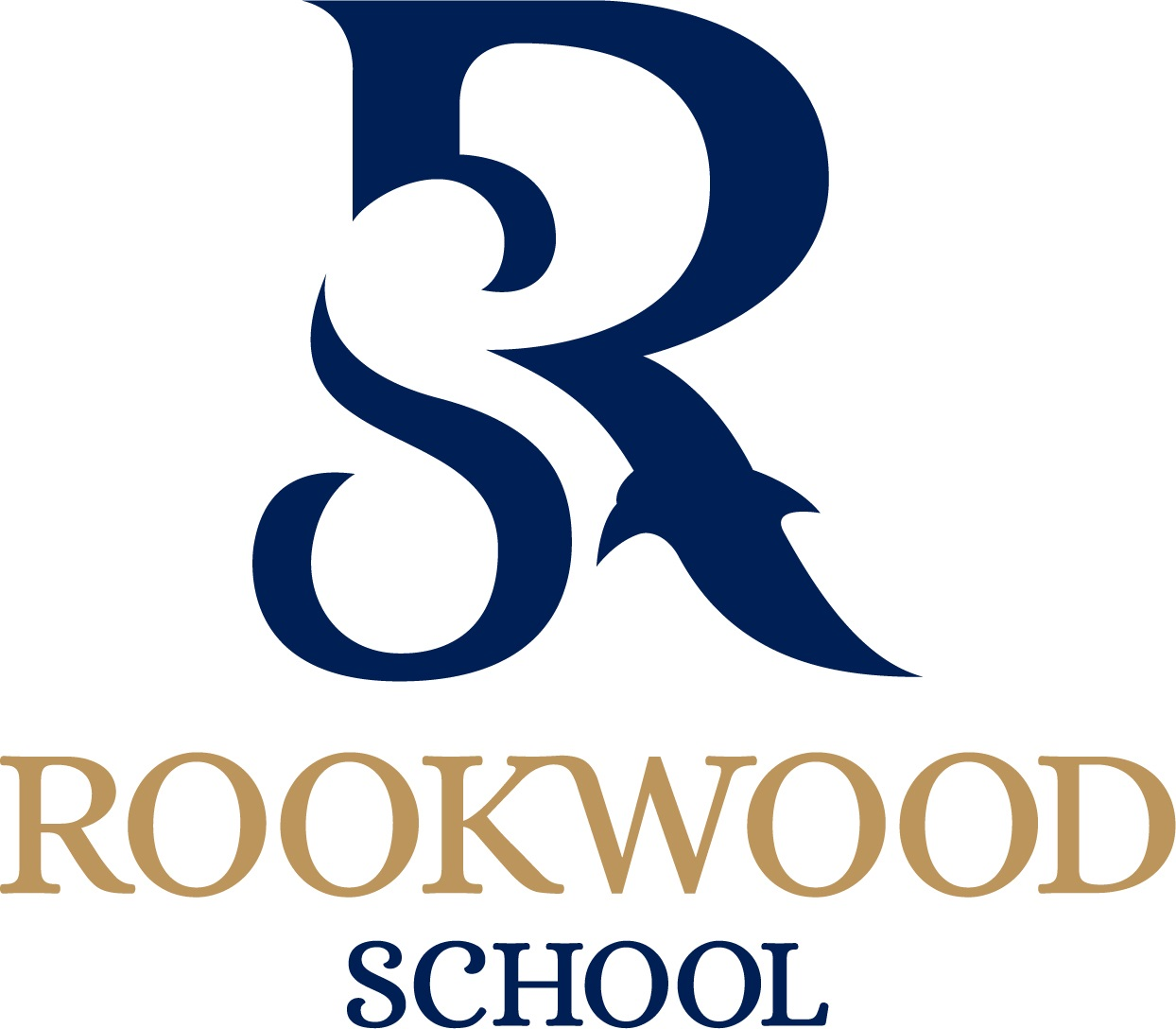

Location
- Weyhill Road; Andover, Hampshire, SP10 3AL; England; 51.20668°N 1.49313°W

Information
- Type: Private day and boarding
- Motto: Sapere Aude
- Established: 1934
- Local authority: Hampshire County Council
- Department for Education URN: 116513 Tables
- Headteacher: Paul Robinson
- Gender: Coeducational
- Age: 2 to 16
- Enrolment: 330~
- Website: http://www.rookwoodschool.org

Rookwood School is an independent day and boarding school for children aged 2 to 16, located on a campus off Weyhill Road in Andover, Hampshire, England.

== History ==
The school was founded in 1934 as a girls' school and moved to its current site in 1946. Boys were admitted to the Senior School in 2003.

== Heads ==
2024–present Mr P Robinson

2017 - 2024 Mr A Kirk-Burgess

2016 - 2017 Dr M Whalley

2015/16 Winter term Mr David Bown (acting)

2010-2015 Mrs Louise Whetstone

2000-2010 Mrs Margaret Langley

Previous Headmistresses: Mrs Shelia Hindle, Miss Kathleen Tanner

== Organisation ==
The school has three departments: the Lower School consisting of (Pre-School, Pre-Preparatory and Prep School), Senior School and Little Rooks (nursery)

== Academics ==
Rookwood School opened a new sixth form in September 2021. It was closed in 2026 due to decreasing students, resulting in "numbers that are no longer sufficient to sustain a Sixth Form that is both educationally enriching and financially viable." Students who have left the school are known as 'Old Rooks'.

== Boarding ==
Although most of its pupils are day pupils Rookwood has boarding provision for a small number of boarders. There are two boarding houses: Beechwood (for girls) and Oakwood (for boys).
