= Hanson Turner =

Recipient of the Victoria Cross

Hanson Victor Turner
- Born: 17 July 1910; Andover, Hampshire, England
- Died: 7 June 1944 (aged 33); Manipur, British India
- Burial place: Imphal War Cemetery
- Military career
- Allegiance: United Kingdom
- Branch: British Army
- Rank: Sergeant
- Units: Duke of Wellington's Regiment; The West Yorkshire Regiment
- Conflicts: Second World War: Pacific War; Burma campaign; Burma campaign 1944; Operation U-Go †
- Awards: Victoria Cross

Hanson Victor Turner VC (17 July 1910 – 7 June 1944) was an English recipient of the Victoria Cross, the highest and most prestigious award for gallantry in the face of the enemy that can be awarded to British and Commonwealth forces.

== Details ==
Turner was 33 years old, and an acting sergeant in the 1st Battalion, The West Yorkshire Regiment (The Prince of Wales's Own), British Army during the Second World War. He was awarded the VC for his actions on 6/7 June 1944 during Operation U-Go at Ningthoukong, India, when he almost "single-handedly" and with "doggedness and spirit of endurance of the highest order" held off Japanese attacks until the morning by running back to replenish his supplies. He was killed while throwing a grenade.

=== Citation ===
In Burma, at Ningthoukong on the night of 6th–7th June, 1944, an attack was made by Japanese with medium and light machine guns. The attack largely fell on the position held by a platoon of which Serjeant Turner was one of the Section Commanders. The enemy were able to use grenades with deadly effect. Three machine-guns in the platoon were destroyed and the platoon was forced to give ground. Serjeant Turner with coolness and fine leadership reorganised his party and with a doggedness and spirit of endurance of the highest order repelled all attacks. The position was held throughout the night. When it was clear that the Japanese were attempting to outflank the position, Serjeant Turner, armed with grenades, boldly and fearlessly attacked them single handed. He went back five times for more grenades; and on the sixth occasion, still singlehanded, he was killed while throwing a grenade among the enemy. His conduct on that night will ever be remembered by the Regiment. His superb leadership and undaunted will to win in the early stages of the attack was undoubtedly instrumental in preventing the enemy plan from succeeding. The number of enemy found dead the next morning was ample evidence of the effect his grenade throwing had had. He displayed outstanding valour and had not the slightest thought of his own safety. He died on the battlefield in a spirit of supreme self-sacrifice.

— the London Gazette 15 August 1944

The citation refers to Ningthoukong as being in Burma, but it is actually in the state of Manipur in India.

== Legacy ==
Although Hanson Victor Turner was 'originally' a 'Duke', he was serving with The West Yorkshire Regiment (The Prince of Wales's Own) when he was awarded his VC. When his medal was put up for sale, at auction, it was purchased by the Halifax Town Council, as he was a local, Halifax, resident. It is displayed in The Duke of Wellington's Regiment Regimental Museum in Bankfield Museum, Halifax, West Yorkshire, England.
