= William Morrant Baker =

English physician and surgeon

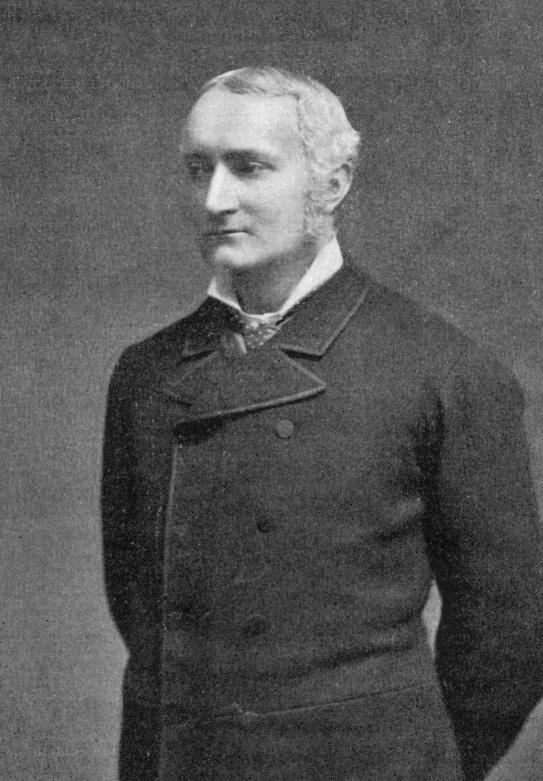
William Morrant Baker from his obituary in the British Medical Journal in 1896.

William Morrant Baker (20 October 1839, Andover, Hampshire, England – 3 October 1896, Pulborough, Sussex) was an English physician and surgeon. He first described the condition now known as Baker's cyst.

== Life ==
William Morrant Baker was the son of a solicitor in the Hampshire town of Andover. He was apprenticed to the local surgeon, Mr. Payne. In 1858 he entered St. Bartholomew's Hospital Medical School in London and qualified in 1861.

Baker became Sir James Paget's assistant for many years. From 1869 until 1885, he was lecturer in general anatomy and physiology at St. Bartholomew's Hospital. He was elected an assistant surgeon to the hospital in 1871 and a surgeon in 1882. He resigned his post as surgeon in 1892 due to his locomotor ataxia. He was then appointed a governor of the hospital.

Baker was also surgeon, later consultant surgeon, to the Evelina Children's Hospital, London and was examinator of general anatomy and physiology at the Royal College of Surgeons.

== Work ==
He wrote a number of articles on bone and joint problems. He became regarded as an expert in renal surgery, particularly nephrolithomy. He first described the knee joint problem Baker's cyst which is named after him, as are Baker's cannula, a flexible tracheal cannula and Baker's disease a defect of the periarticular ligaments. Baker's other major contribution was his original description in 1873 of a kind of infective dermatitis known today as erysipeloid.

== Bibliography ==
- Handbook of Physiology by William Senhouse Kirkes (1823–1864). (Editor)
- Statistics of cancer. Transactions of the Medico-Chirurgical Society of London, Vol. XIV.
- Erythema serpens. St. Bartholomew's Hospital Reports, 1873, 9: 198–211. on Rosenbach's erysipeloid.
- The formation of abnormal synovial cysts in connection with the joints. II. Saint Bartholomew's Hospital Reports, London, 1885; 21: 177–190. On Baker's cyst.
- Baker's cyst: formation of abnormal synovial cysts in connection with joints. Medical Classics, 1941; 5: 805–820.
