= Rooksbury Mill =

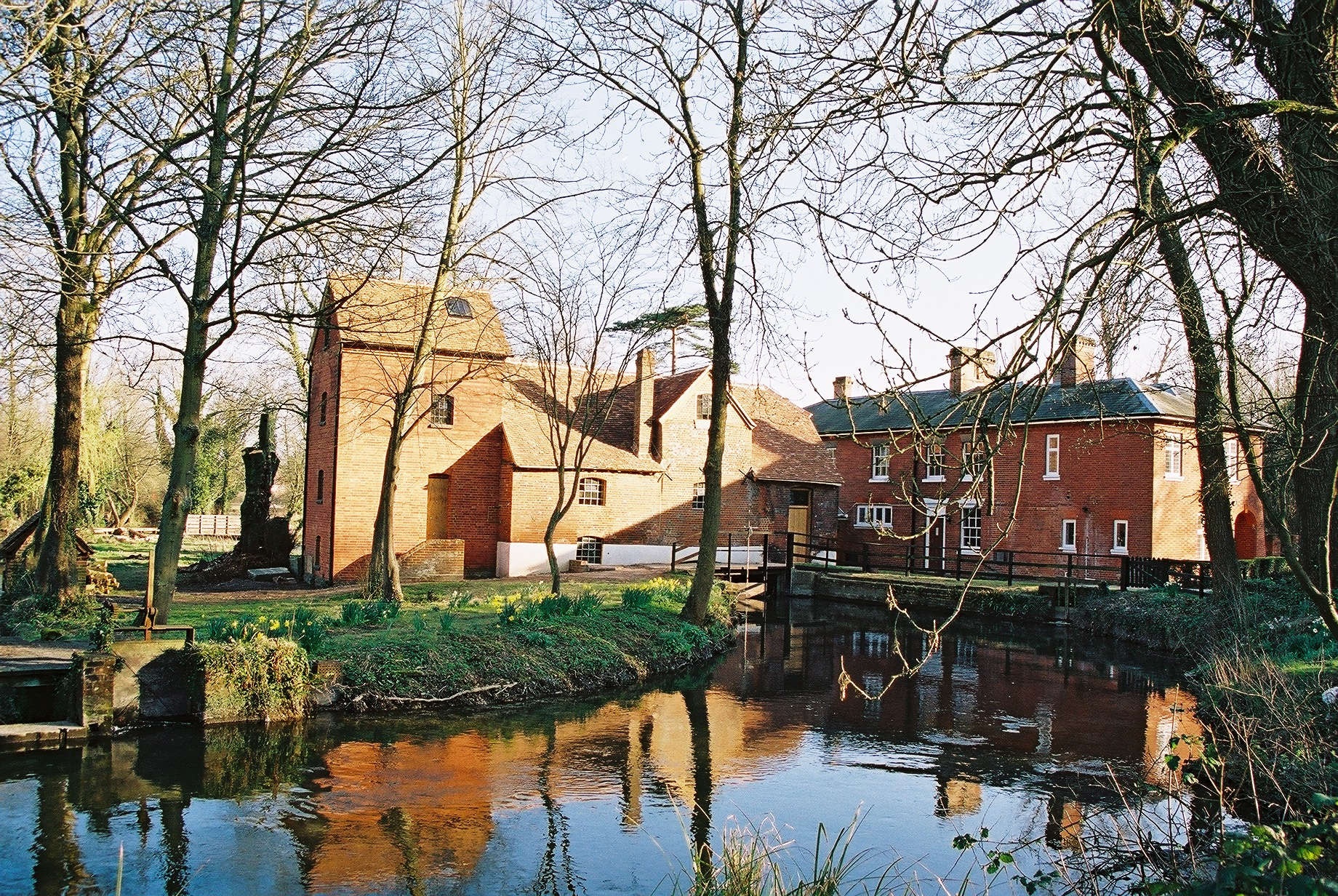
- Rooksbury Mill and Mill House

- Location within Hampshire
- 51°11′57″N 1°29′37″W
- Type: Watermill
- Location: Rooksbury Road, Andover
- OS grid reference: SU 35485 44557

Site notes
- Area: Hampshire
- Owner: Private

Listed Building – Grade II
- Official name: Rooksbury Mill
- Designated: 24 June 1983
- Reference no.: 1236564

Rooksbury Mill is an old watermill on the River Anton in Andover, Hampshire, England, and a Grade II listed building. The building and its associated structures are privately owned, but the surrounding land is owned by the Test Valley Borough Council and managed as a local nature reserve.

Although the present mill building dates from the late 16th or early 17th century, Rooksbury Mill may be one of the eleven mills that, according to the Domesday Book, existed in Andover in 1089.

On the afternoon of Friday 29 May 1812, a barn at Rooksbury Mill was struck by lightning and set ablaze. The fire completely destroyed the barn and its contents, a nearby stable, and two carts. It was reported that the ″instantaneous and complete destruction″ of one of the carts excited particular astonishment. Two men sheltering next to the barn escaped permanent harm, though one of them was temporarily blinded. At that time the Mill was in the possession of the Holloway family.

On the evening of Thursday 9 November 1843 another, though apparently accidental, fire destroyed a thatched barn that stood on exactly the same site as the 1812 barn fire. Although there were numerous people present, nothing could be done to extinguish the blaze, which also threatened the adjacent house and the Mill building, all being in the ownership of John Rawlinson, Esq. The barn eventually collapsed, destroying a large quantity of wheat and a threshing machine that had been in use at the time. The estimated cost of the damage was about £1,000. One cause of concern was that the Andover fire engine did not arrive until nearly one hour after the fire had begun.

Flour milling ceased at the site in the early 20th century, after which the mill building went through a series of uses, including being used as a small theatre. The Test Valley Borough Council sold the building in 2002, shortly after it had been devastated by fire following an arson attack. The new owners restored the building in 2003, rebuilding much of the original structure.

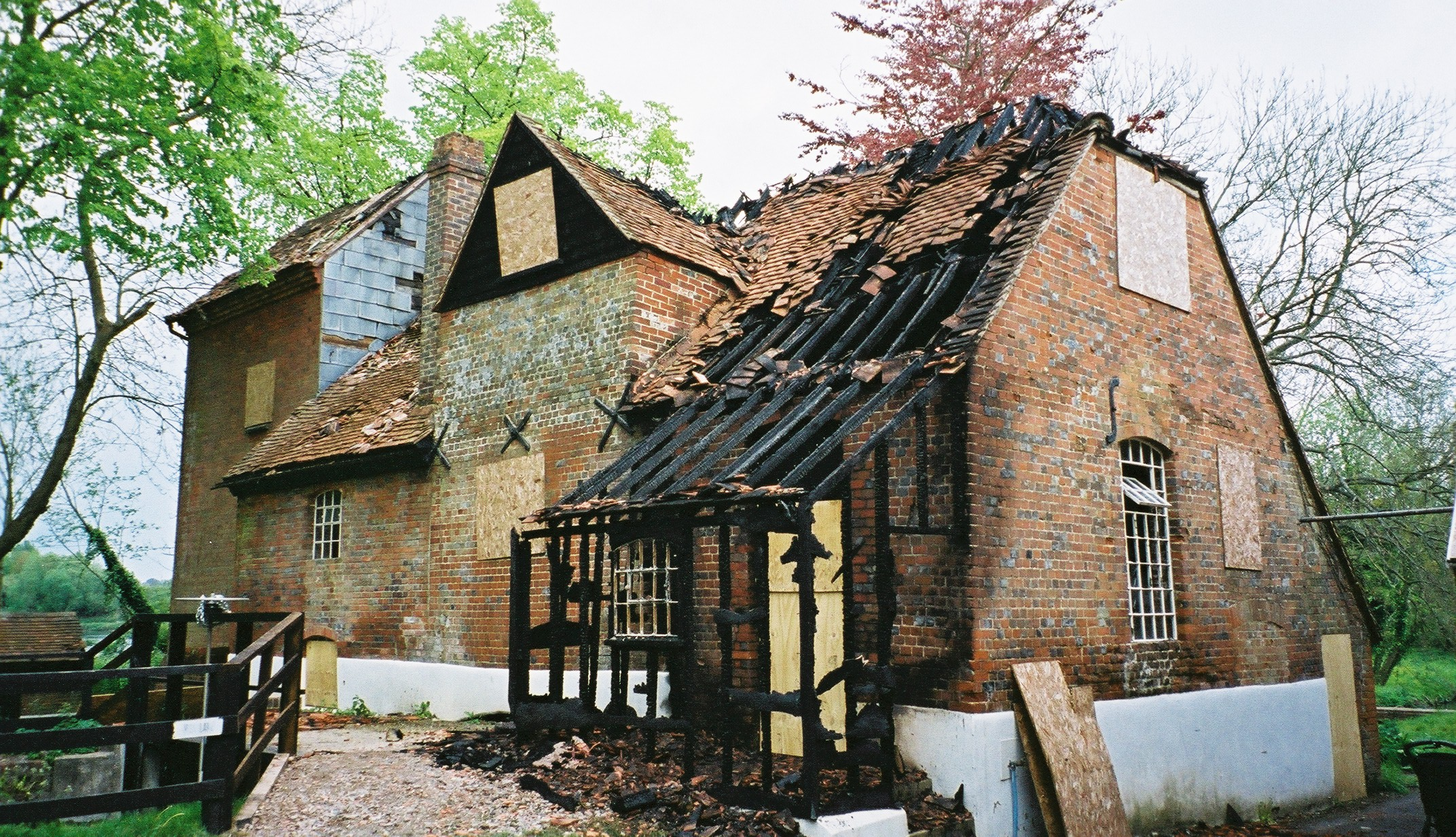
The mill after the fire in 2002

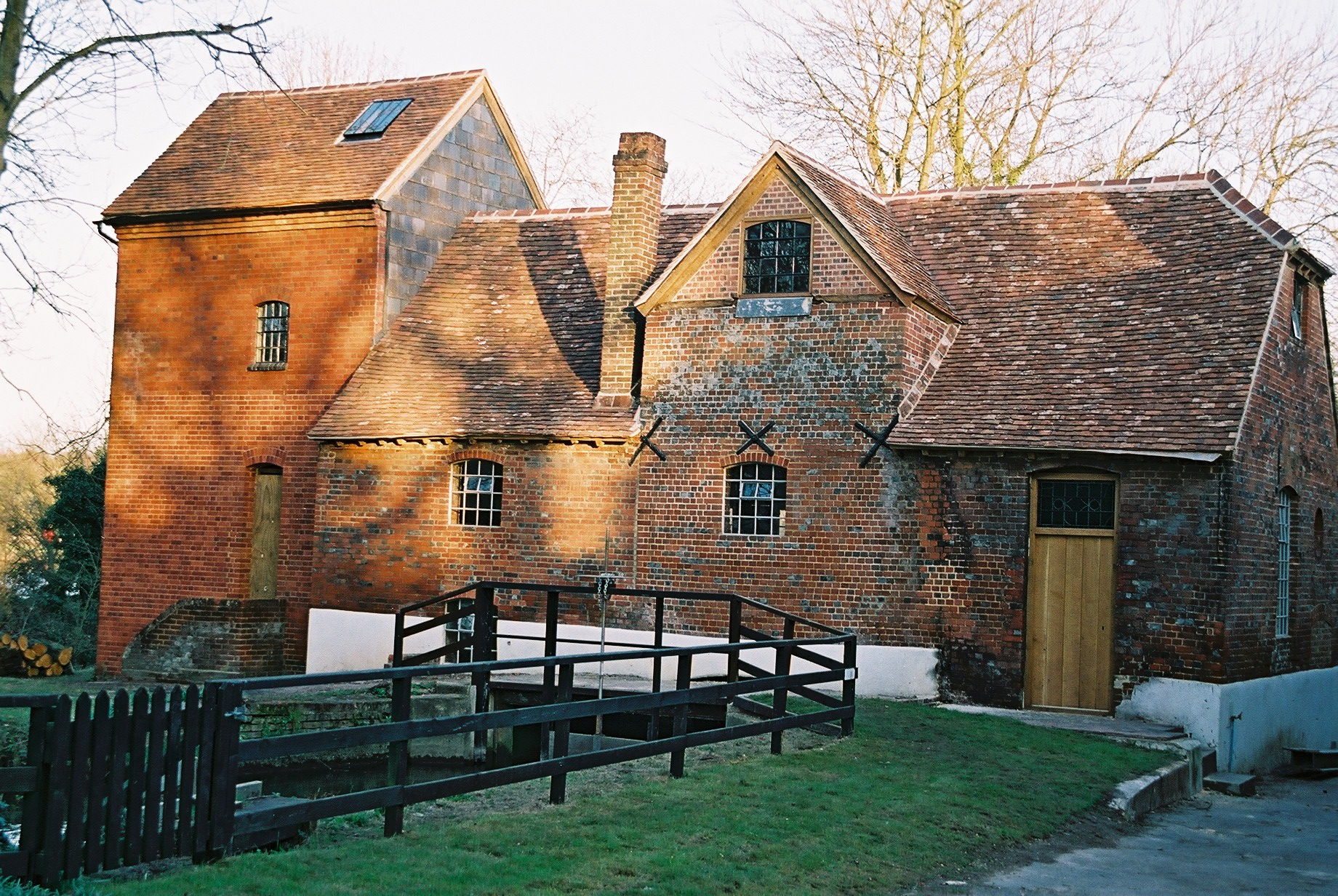
The mill after restoration in 2003

== See also ==
- River Anton
- List of watermills in the United Kingdom
