= Robert Jensen (disambiguation) =

Robert Jensen (born 1958) is a professor of journalism at the University of Texas at Austin.

Robert or Bob Jensen may also refer to:

- Robert Jensen (economist) (born 1970), professor of economics at the Wharton School of the University of Pennsylvania
- Robert C. Jensen (1928–2011), American farmer and politician
- Robert W. Jensen (artist) (1929–2018), American painter, singer and dancer
- Robert R. Jensen (born 1949), American mathematician
- Robert A. Jensen (born 1965), crisis management expert
- Robert Jensen (television personality) (1973–2026), Dutch television personality
- Robert Jensen (footballer) (1895–1967), Danish footballer
- Bob Jensen (American football) (Robert Peter Jensen, 1925–2015), American football player
- Robert Jensen (died 1958), American murder victim of Charles Starkweather

== See also ==
- Robert Jenson (1930–2017), American theologian
