= Eva Skafte Jensen =

Danish linguist (born 1966)

Eva Skafte Jensen (born 1966) is a Danish linguist and researcher at the Danish Language Council.

Her research is focused on the Danish language, its use on social media and history, especially changes in the use of case.

She is included in the Royal Danish Academy, a member of the board for Det Danske Sprog- og Litteraturselskab (The Danish Language and Literature Society) and series editor of the journal Ny Forskning i Grammatik (New Research in Grammar). She has also been a participant in the podcast Klog på Sprog broadcast on the national Danish radio DR P1.

== Biography ==
Eva Skafte Jensen became cand.phil. in Nordic philology in 1994, and PhD in 2001 with a dissertation on Danish sentential adverbs and their word order properties, both degrees from the University of Copenhagen. Then, in 2001-2003 she was a postdoc financed by the Carlsberg Foundation after which she became associate professor at Roskilde University. During this position, she finished a dissertation on the nominative case earning her the higher doctorate (dr.phil). In 2012, she moved to the Danish Language Council as a senior researcher.

== Selected publications ==
- Therkelsen, Rita; Skafte Jensen, Eva (2009). Dramatikken i grammatikken. Roskilde: Institut for kultur og identitet, Roskilde universitet. ISBN 978-87-7349-747-0. OCLC 488333658.
- Jensen, Eva Skafte (2011). Nominativ i gammelskånsk - afvikling og udviklinger: med udgangspunkt i Skånske Lov i Stockholm B 69 (in Danish). København: Universitets-Jubilæets danske Samfund. ISBN 978-87-7674-605-6. OCLC 811005217.
- Jensen, Eva Skafte (2013). "Ordklasseproblemer, tilfældet sådan". LexicoNordica. 20: 55–74.
- Jensen, Eva Skafte (2021). "Et system i stadig bevægelse. Pronominalkasus i dansk". Danske Studier. 2021: 45–71.
