= Robert Jensen (economist) =

American economist (born 1970)

Robert T. Jensen
- Born: December 20, 1970 (age 55)

Academic background
- Education: Princeton University

Robert Todd Jensen (born December 20, 1970) is an American economist who currently works as a professor of economics and the director of the program on social enterprise at the Yale School of Management. His research focuses on the microeconomics of international poverty and economic development.

== Biography ==
Robert Jensen graduated magna cum laude from Williams College with a B.A. in economics in 1993, followed by a Ph.D. in economics from Princeton University in 1998. Thereafter, Jensen worked at the John F. Kennedy School of Government (Harvard University) from 1998 to 2007, first as an assistant professor of public policy (1998–2002) and then as an associate professor (2002–07). In 2008, Jensen moved to the Luskin School of Public Affairs (UCLA), where he was made full professor in 2012. In 2013, he further moved to the Wharton School of the University of Pennsylvania, where he has been the David B. Ford Professor of Business Economics and Public Policy since 2016, served as department chair since 2014 and acted as a director of the Huntsman Program in International Studies and Business since 2016. He moved to Yale in 2018. Additionally, Jensen has held visiting professorships at Brown University and the Ecole des Hautes Etudes en Sciences Sociales.

In terms of professional service, he currently serves as an associate editor for the Quarterly Journal of Economics and has served on the editorial boards of the Journal of Development Economics (2010–16) and Economic Development and Cultural Change in addition to being a referee to various academic journals. He is associated with several economic research institutes, including the National Bureau of Economic Research (since 1998), J-PAL, and the International Growth Centre.

== Research ==
Robert Jensen's research concentrates on the microeconomics of international poverty and economic development in relation to a variety of topics such as gender, health, education, fertility and the role of markets and private enterprises. Findings of research conducted by him and his co-authors include the following:

- The adoption of mobile phones by Kerala fishermen and wholesalers dramatically reduced price dispersion and eliminated waste by providing ongoing and accurate information on market demand and prices;
- Correcting students' excessively low perceptions of the returns to secondary education by providing them with information is effective in substantially delaying the end of their schooling;
- Introducing cable television may significantly decrease fertility, son preference, and the reported acceptability of domestic violence by exposing communities to information about alternative values and lifestyles;
- Jensen and Nolan Miller find strong evidence for rice being a Giffen good, i.e. a good for which demand decreases as price decreases, in Hunan province;
- Large food price subsidies for two households may not improve and even deteriorate nutrition by allowing consumers to substitute towards foods with higher nonnutritional attributes.
