= Thomas Jensen =

Thomas Jensen may refer to:

- Thomas Jensen (conductor) (1898–1963), Danish orchestra conductor
- Thomas Jensen (politician) (born 1970), Danish politician
- Thomas Skriver Jensen (born 1996), Danish politician
- Thomas Andie (Thomas Andie Jensen, born 1972), Danish football player
- Tom Jensen (1948–2026), American politician from Kentucky
