= Katharina Jensen =

German politician (born 1986)

Member of the Landtag of Lower Saxony
- Incumbent
- Assumed office 8 November 2022

Personal details
- Born: 6 January 1986 (age 40)
- Party: Christian Democratic Union (since 2016)

Katharina Jensen (born 6 January 1986) is a German politician serving as a member of the Landtag of Lower Saxony since 2022. She has served as spokesperson for consumer protection policy of the Christian Democratic Union group in the Landtag since 2024.
