= Jorgen Arendt Jensen =

Jorgen Arendt Jensen from the Technical University of Denmark, Lyngby, Denmark was named Fellow of the Institute of Electrical and Electronics Engineers (IEEE) in 2012 for contributions to medical ultrasound imaging systems.
