= Baker's cyst =

- Other names: Popliteal cyst
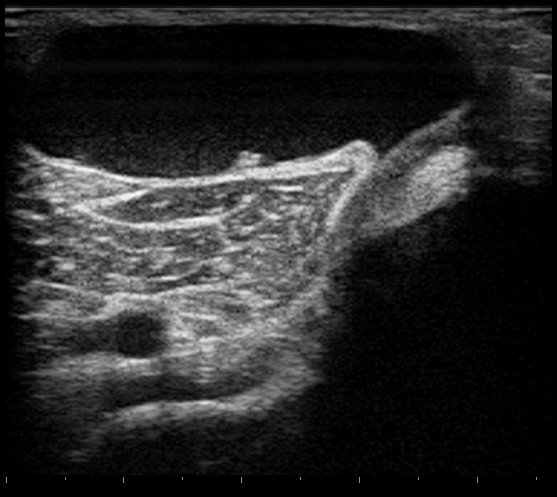
- Ultrasound image of Baker's cyst
- Specialty: Rheumatology
- Symptoms: None, swelling behind the knee, stiffness, pain
- Complications: Deep vein thrombosis, peripheral neuropathy, ischemia, compartment syndrome
- Usual onset: Gradual
- Risk factors: Knee problems such as osteoarthritis, meniscal tears, rheumatoid arthritis
- Diagnostic method: Confirmed by ultrasound or MRI
- Differential diagnosis: Deep venous thrombosis, aneurysms, ganglion cyst, tumors
- Treatment: Supportive care, aspiration, surgery
- Frequency: c. 20%

A Baker's cyst, also known as a popliteal cyst, is a type of fluid collection behind the knee. Often there are no symptoms. If symptoms do occur these may include swelling and pain behind the knee, or knee stiffness. If the cyst breaks open, pain may significantly increase with swelling of the calf. Rarely complications such as deep vein thrombosis, peripheral neuropathy, ischemia, or compartment syndrome may occur.

Risk factors include other knee problems such as osteoarthritis, meniscal tears, or rheumatoid arthritis. The underlying mechanism involves the flow of synovial fluid from the knee joint to the gastrocnemio-semimembranosus bursa, resulting in its expansion. The diagnosis may be confirmed with ultrasound or magnetic resonance imaging (MRI).

Treatment is initially with supportive care. If this is not effective aspiration and steroid injection or surgical removal may be carried out. Around 20% of people have a Baker's cyst. They occur most commonly in those 35 to 70 years old. It is named after the surgeon who first described it, William Morrant Baker (1838–1896).

== Signs and symptoms ==
Symptoms may include swelling behind the knee, stiffness, and pain. If the cyst breaks open, pain may increase, and there may be swelling of the calf. Rupture of a Baker's cyst may also cause bruising below the medial malleolus of the ankle (Crescent sign).

== Cause ==
In adults, Baker's cysts usually arise from almost any form of knee arthritis (e.g., rheumatoid arthritis) or cartilage (particularly a meniscus) tear. Baker's cysts in children do not point to underlying joint disease. Baker's cysts arise between the tendons of the medial head of the gastrocnemius and the semimembranosus muscles. They are posterior to the medial femoral condyle.

The synovial sac of the knee joint can, under certain circumstances, produce a posterior bulge, into the popliteal space, the space behind the knee. When this bulge becomes large enough, it becomes palpable and cystic. Most Baker's cysts maintain this direct communication with the synovial cavity of the knee, but sometimes, the new cyst pinches off. A Baker's cyst can rupture and produce acute pain behind the knee and in the calf and swelling of the calf muscles.

== Diagnosis ==
Diagnosis is by examination. A Baker's cyst is easier to see from behind with the patient standing with knees fully extended. It is most easily palpated (felt) with the knee partially flexed. Diagnosis is confirmed by ultrasonography, although if needed and there is no suspicion of a popliteal artery aneurysm then aspiration of synovial fluid from the cyst may be undertaken with care. An MRI image can reveal presence of a Baker's cyst.

An infrequent but potentially life-threatening complication, which may need to be excluded by blood tests and ultrasonography, is a deep vein thrombosis (DVT). Quick assessment of the possibility of DVT may be required where a Baker's cyst has compressed vascular structures, causing leg edema, as this sets up conditions for a DVT to develop.

A burst cyst commonly causes calf pain, swelling and redness that may mimic thrombophlebitis.

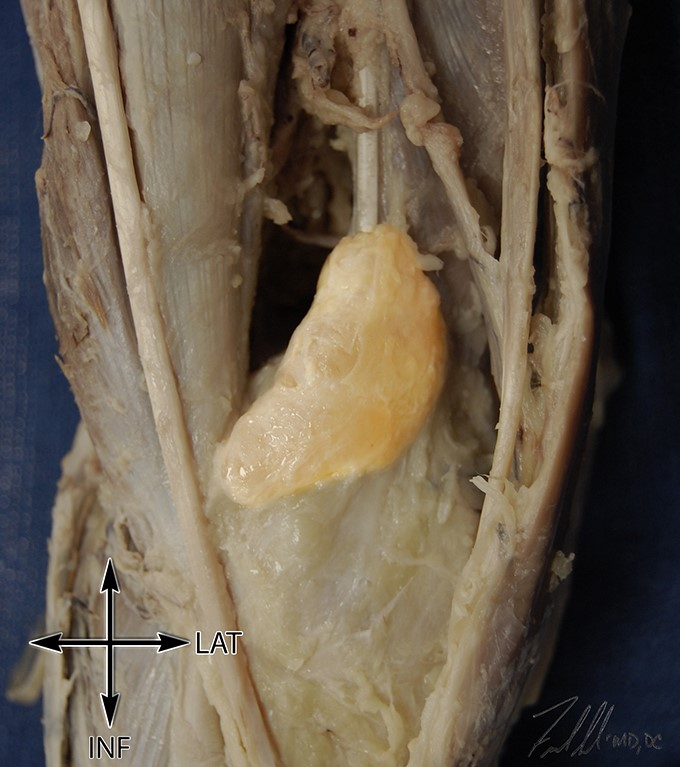
A specimen from a cadaver of a Baker's cyst in popliteal space

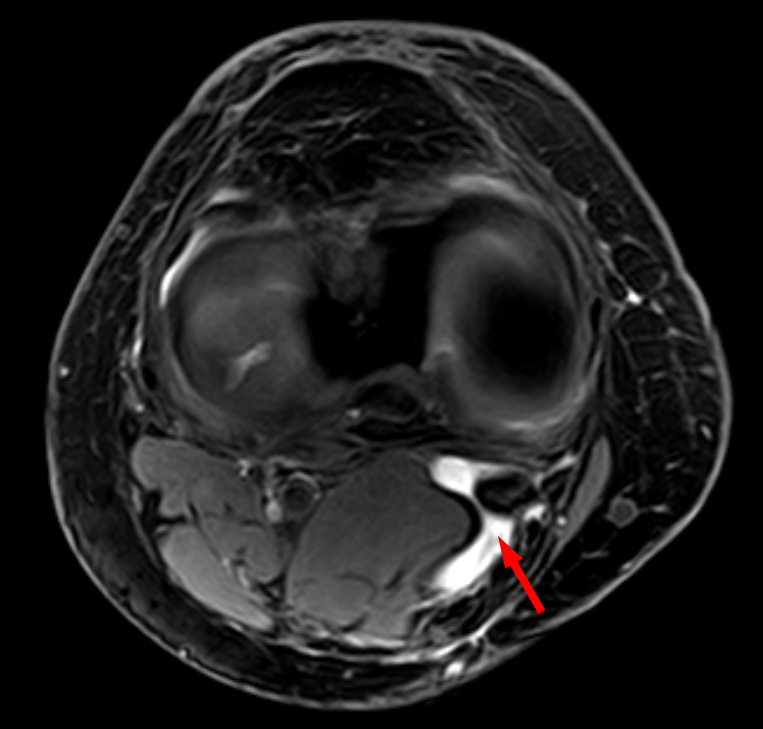
Baker's cyst on axial MRI with communicating channel between the semimembranosus muscle and the medial head of the gastrocnemius muscle

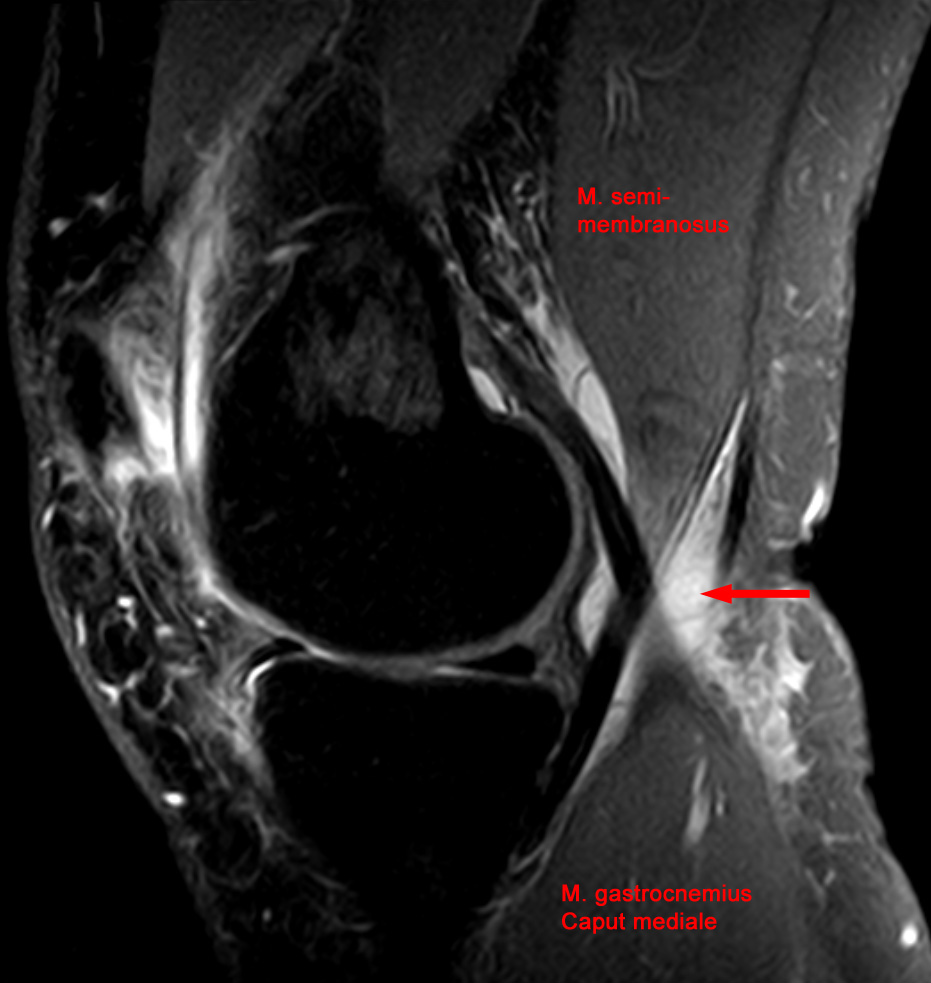
Baker's cyst on MRI, sagittal image

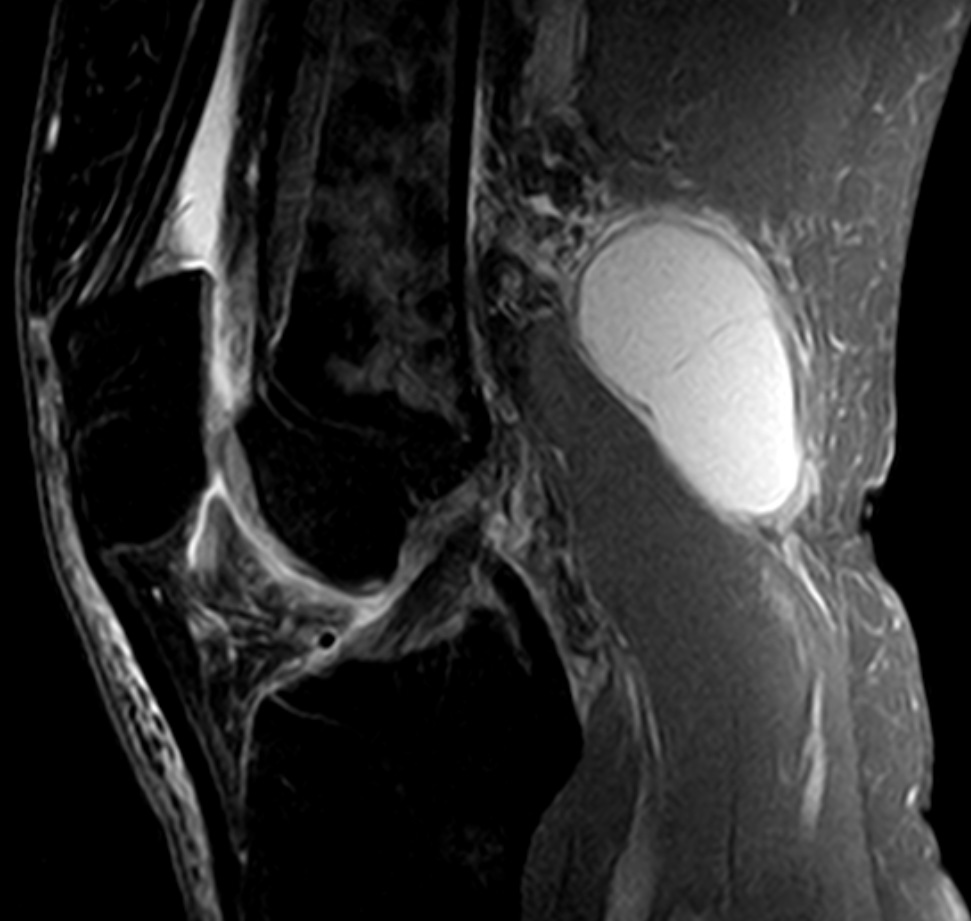
Baker's cyst on MRI, sagittal image

== Treatment ==
Baker's cysts usually require no treatment unless they are symptomatic. It is very rare that the symptoms are actually coming from the cyst. In most cases, there is another disorder in the knee (arthritis, meniscal (cartilage) tear, etc.) that is causing the problem. Initial treatment should be directed at correcting the source of the increased fluid production. Often rest and leg elevation are all that is needed. If necessary, the cyst can be aspirated to reduce its size, then injected with a corticosteroid to reduce inflammation. Surgical excision is reserved for cysts that cause a great amount of discomfort to the patient. A ruptured cyst is treated with rest, leg elevation, and injection of a corticosteroid into the knee.

=== Exercise ===
Many activities can put strain on the knee, and cause pain in the case of Baker's cyst. Avoiding activities such as squatting, kneeling, heavy lifting, climbing, and running can help prevent pain. Despite this, some exercises can help relieve pain, and a physiotherapist may instruct on hamstring stretching to reduce pressure on the Baker's Cyst, and strengthening exercises for the quadriceps and/or the patellar ligament.
