= Harrow Way Community School =

Location
- Harrow Way; Andover, Hampshire, SP10 4LW; England; 51.2167°N 1.5012°W

Information
- Type: Community school
- Motto: Learning For Life, Success For All
- Religious affiliation: any
- Local authority: Hampshire
- Department for Education URN: 116431 Tables
- Ofsted: Reports
- Headteacher: Dawn German
- Gender: Coeducational
- Age: 11 to 16
- Enrolment: 1000~ as of September 2026
- Website: http://www.harrowway.hants.sch.uk/

Harrow Way Community School is a coeducational community secondary school. It is located on the Harrow Way in Andover, in the English county of Hampshire.

It is administered by Hampshire County Council which coordinates the school's admissions. Harrow Way has also gained specialist status as a Maths and Computing College. The school offers GCSEs, BTECs and other level 1 and 2 courses as programmes of study for pupils.

== History ==
Harrow Way School was opened in September 1967.

Heads:

- 1967-88: Alan Garner
- 1988-2004: Chris Overton
- 2004-11: Charlie Currie
- 2011-12: Mark Warren, acting head
- 2012–2023: Michael Serridge
- 2023–Present: Dawn German

== Ofsted judgements ==
The school was visited by Ofsted in 1995, 2000, 2002, 2007, 2013, 2017 and 2022.

As of 2026, the school's most recent judgement was Good, in 2022.
