= John Jensen (disambiguation) =

John Jensen (born 1965) is a Danish football manager and former player.

John(ny) or Jon(athan) Jensen may also refer to:

- Jon A. Jensen, American military officer
- Jon J. Jensen (born 1965), American lawyer and judge
- John Jensen (cartoonist), Australian-British cartoonist and caricature artist
- John Jensen (footballer, born 1937), Danish footballer
- John Jensen (costume designer), American costume designer
- John Jensen (public servant) (1884–1970), Australian senior public servant
- John Erik Jensen (born 1945), Danish Olympic rower
- John W. Jensen (1926–2012), American politician from Iowa
- Johnny Jensen (born 1972), Norwegian handball player
- Johnny E. Jensen (born 1947), Danish cinematographer
- Johnny Jensen (rallycross), Danish rallycross driver in FIA European Rallycross Championship
- Johnny Jensen (actor), American actor, see List of General Hospital characters
- Johnny Rønne Jensen (born 1974), Danish figure skater
- Jonathan Asp Jensen, Danish footballer
