= Andover Museum and Museum of the Iron Age =

Museum

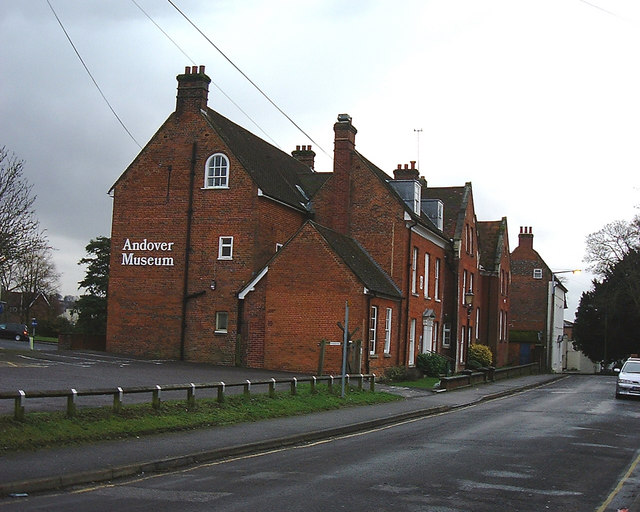
- Andover Museum of the Iron Age
- Location: 6 Church Cl, Andover SP10 1DP, UK
- Coordinates: 51.2101°N 1.4773°W
- Type: History museum
- Collection size: Iron age exhibits
- Website: www.hampshireculture.org.uk/museum-iron-age

Andover Museum and Museum of the Iron Age is a museum with two collections: the Andover Museum focuses on the history of the town of Andover, and the Museum of the Iron Age serves as a major focus for museum and educational activities surrounding archaeological work at the nearby Danebury hill fort. It is run by Hampshire Cultural Trust.

== History ==
The museum opened in 1986. The museum is in a Georgian town house built in the 1750s. The museum houses items from the Bronze Age along with arts and crafts from the Iron Age. The BBC referred to the museum in their "Iron Age Sites in Britain: Explore the Iron Age sites of England, Wales and Scotland." The Times has described it as "the best explanation of Iron Age life available".
