= Erik Jensen =

Erik Jensen may refer to:

- Erik Jensen (actor), American film, television and theater actor, playwright
- Erik Jensen (American football) (born 1980), former American football player
- Erik Jensen (boxer) (1921-1987), Danish Olympic boxer
- Erik Jensen (footballer), Danish footballer
- Erik Jensen (hurdler) (born 1962), Danish Olympic hurdler
- Erik Jensen (Greenlandic politician)
- Erik Jensen (writer), author and journalist, co-writer of 2019 film Acute Misfortune
- Erik Aalbæk Jensen (1923–1997), Danish writer
- Erik Kuld Jensen (1925–2004), Danish football player
- Erik Pondal Jensen, Danish footballer

== See also ==
- Eric Jensen (disambiguation)
- Eirik Jensen, Norwegian former policeman turned criminal
- Erik Flensted-Jensen (1908–1993), founder and leader of the Danish Gym Team
- Knut Erik Jensen (born 1940), Norwegian film director
