= Martin Jensen =

Martin Jensen may refer to:

== Other people ==
- Martin Jensen (DJ), Danish DJ and music producer
- Martin Jensen (sound engineer), American sound engineer
- Marlin K. Jensen (born 1942), general authority of the Church of Jesus Christ of Latter-day Saints

== Sports ==
- Martin S. Jensen (born 1973), Danish footballer
- Martin Jensen (footballer) (born 1978), Danish footballer
- Martin Jensen (cricketer) (born 1976), Danish cricketer
- Martin Jensen (triple jumper) (1942–2016), Norwegian triple jumper
