= Lasse Jensen =

American theoretical chemist

Lasse Jensen is a professor of theoretical chemistry at Pennsylvania State University whose works have appeared in such chemistry journals as the Journal of the American Chemical Society, Journal of Physical Chemistry A, Journal of Chemical Physics and the Chemical Society Reviews, among others. He got his bachelor's degree from University of Copenhagen in 1998 and two years later obtained master's from the same place. Four years later he got his Ph.D. from the University of Groningen and till 2007 worked as a postdoc at the Northwestern University along with George C. Schatz. He is well-recognized by many honors and awards for the theoretical investigations of plasmon-enhanced vibrational spectroscopies and the development of a hybrid atomistic electrodynamics-quantum mechanical model. As of 2017 he is author or coauthor of over 100 peer-reviewed articles, generating more than 6400 career citations and an h-index of 45. Jensen is a recipient of the 2010 Presidential Early Career Award for Scientists and Engineers.
