= James Jensen =

James or Jim Jensen may refer to:

- James A. Jensen (1918–1998), paleontologist, known as Dinosaur Jim
- James H. Jensen (1864–1943), Wisconsin state assemblyman
- James Jensen (The Sadhu), character in The Sadhu
- Jim Jensen (reporter) (1926–1999), American TV journalist
- Jim Jensen (wide receiver) (born 1958), known as "Crash" Jensen
- Jim Jensen (Nebraska politician) (born 1934), Nebraska state senator
- Jim Jensen (running back) (born 1953), running back who mostly played for the Denver Broncos
