= Viggo Jensen (disambiguation) =

Viggo Jensen may refer to:

- Viggo Jensen, Danish gymnast and Denmark's first Olympic gold medalist
- Viggo Jensen (footballer, born 1921), Danish footballer for Hull City who won a bronze medal at the 1948 Summer Olympics
- Viggo Jensen (footballer, born 1947), Danish footballer and football manager who has managed Estonia, the Denmark under-21s, and a number of Danish clubs
