= Morten Jensen =

Morten Jensen may refer to:

- Morten Jensen (sailor) (born 1951), Norwegian Olympic sailor
- Morten Jensen (football coach) (born 1980), Norwegian football coach
- Morten Jensen (long jumper) (born 1982), Danish track and field athlete
- Morten Jensen (footballer) (born 1987), German football goalkeeper
- Morten Haastrup Jensen (born 1989), Danish football goalkeeper
- Morten Jensen (ice hockey) (born 1997), Danish ice hockey player
