= Eric Jensen =

Eric Jensen may refer to:

- Eric Jensen (racing driver) (born 1970), Canadian race team owner and race car driver
- Eric Jensen (Neighbours), a character from the soap opera Neighbours

== See also ==
- Erik Jensen (disambiguation)
