= Christian Jensen =

Christian Jensen may refer to:

- Christian Albrecht Jensen (1792–1870), Danish portrait painter
- Christian Jensen (politician) (1823–1884), Norwegian politician
- Christian E.O. Jensen (1859–1941), Danish pharmacist and botanist
- Christian Cornelius Jensen (1883–1940), German classical philologist
- Christian Ludvig Jensen (1885–1978), Norwegian barrister, politician and organizational leader
- Christian Jensen (weightlifter) (1888–1947), Danish Olympic weightlifter
