= Andover, Hampshire =

Town in Hampshire, England

Coordinates: 51.208°N 1.480°W

Andover
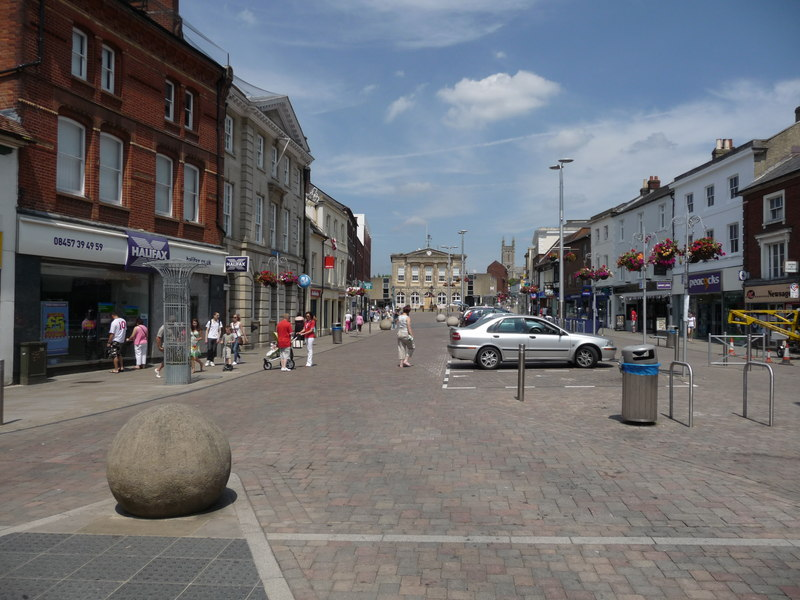
- High Street with Andover Guildhall at the top of the street

- Location within Hampshire
- Population: 52,753 (2021 Census)
- OS grid reference: SU3646
- Civil parish: Andover
- District: Test Valley
- Shire county: Hampshire
- Region: South East
- Country: England
- Sovereign state: United Kingdom
- Post town: Andover
- Postcode district: SP10, SP11
- Dialling code: 01264
- Police: Hampshire and Isle of Wight
- Fire: Hampshire and Isle of Wight
- Ambulance: South Central
- UK Parliament: North West Hampshire
- Website: Town Council

Andover (/ˈændoʊvər/ AN-doh-vər) is a town in the Test Valley district of Hampshire, England. The town is on the River Anton, a major tributary of the Test, and lies alongside the major A303 trunk road at the eastern end of Salisbury Plain, 18 miles (29 km) west of the town of Basingstoke. It is 14 miles (23 km) from Winchester, 35 miles (56 km) north of Southampton and 65 miles (105 km) from London.

The town developed as a centre for grain milling and wool processing, and in the 20th century it took on a significant Armed Forces presence.

== History ==
=== Early history ===
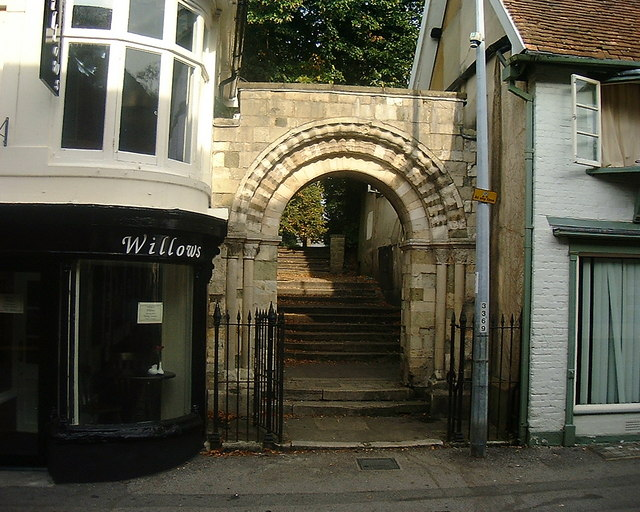
Norman arch c. 1150, all that remains of the Old Church of St Mary

Andover's name is recorded in Old English in 955 as Andeferas, and is thought to be of Celtic origin: compare Welsh onn dwfr = "ash (tree) water". The first mention in history is in 950 when King Edred is recorded as having built a royal hunting lodge there. In 962 King Edgar called a meeting of the Saxon 'parliament' (the Witenagemot) at his hunting lodge near Andover. Of more importance was the baptism, in 994, of a Viking king named "Anlaf" (allied with the Danish king, Sweyn Forkbeard). The identity of that man was either Olav Tryggvason (king of Norway) or Olof Skötkonung (king of Sweden). The baptism was part of a deal with the English king, Æthelred the Unready, whereby the Viking stopped ravaging England and returned home.

At the time of the Domesday Book (1086), Andovere had 107 adult male inhabitants and probably had a total population of about 500. It was a relatively large settlement; most villages had only 100 to 150 people. Andover had six watermills which ground grain to flour. The town's relative isolation implies a market for grain and flour. In 1175 Andover bought a royal charter granting certain townspeople rights and forming a merchant guild which took over local governance (see ancient borough); guild members elected two officials (bailiffs) who ran the town. In 1201 King John gave the merchants the right to collect royal taxes in Andover themselves. In 1256 Henry III gave the townspeople the right to hold a court and try criminals for offences committed in Andover. Andover sent MPs to the parliaments of 1295 and 1302–1307. The town was ravaged by two serious fires, in 1141 and 1435. Andover remained a small market town. Processing wool appears to have been the main industry and street names in the area of the town known as "Sheep Fair" commemorate this. A weekly market, and an annual fair were held.

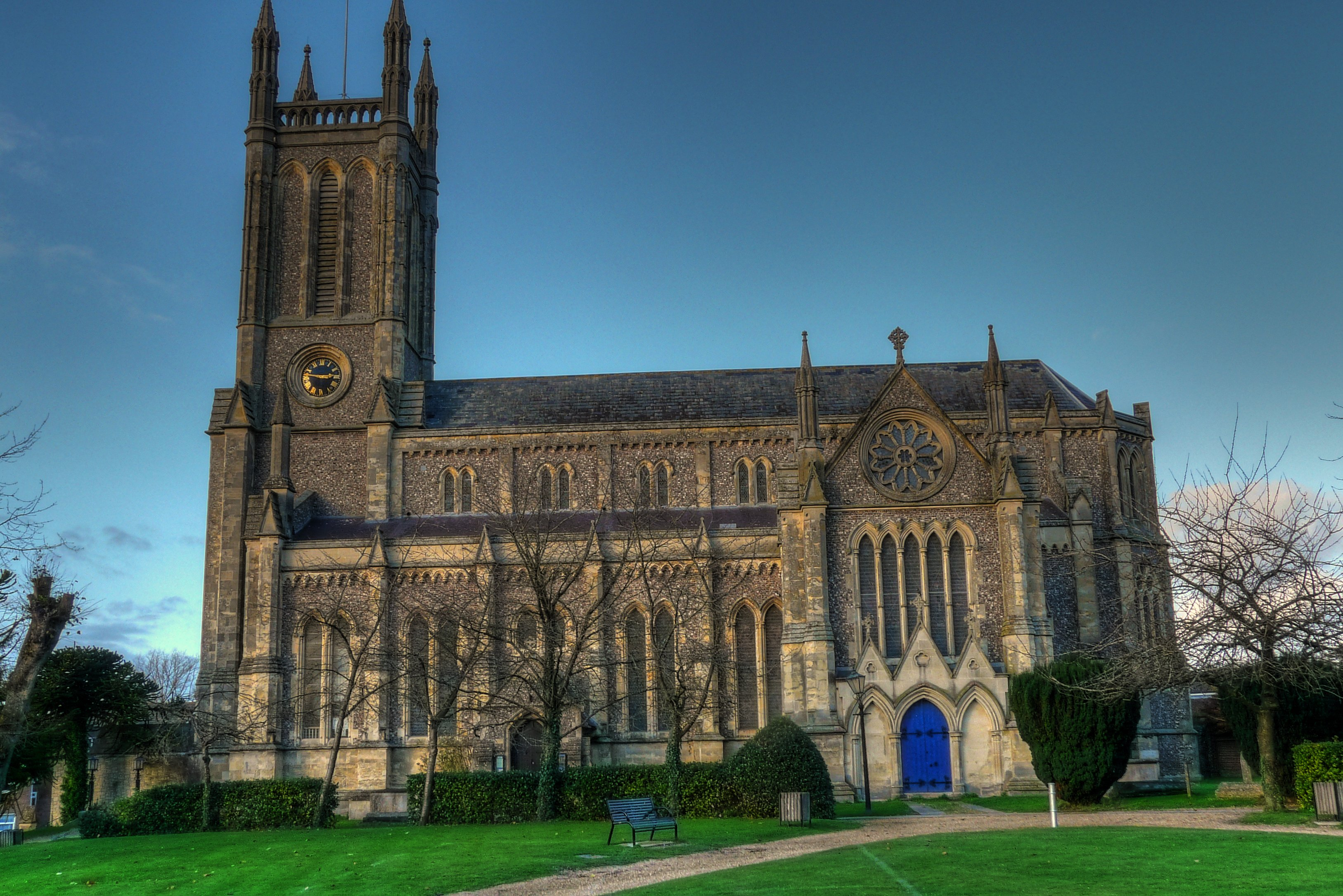
St Mary's Parish Church

As well as the Church of St Mary, the town had a priory and a hospital run by monks, dedicated to St John the Baptist, and also a lepers hostel to St Mary Magdalene. In 1538 during the Reformation Henry VIII closed the priory and the hospital. In 1571 a free school for the boys of Andover was established in the grounds of St Mary's Church. This in time became Andover Grammar School, and in the 1970s it became John Hanson Community School. The school has occupied various sites in the town over the course of its history and is currently located in Floral Way.

In 1599 the town received a new charter from Elizabeth I. The merchants guild was made a corporation and the number of annual fairs was increased from one to three. Like other towns Andover suffered from outbreaks of plague. There were outbreaks in 1603–1605, 1625–1626 and 1636.

=== 18th and 19th century ===
During the 18th century, being on the main Exeter – Salisbury – London road, the place became a refuelling or overnight stop for stagecoaches and other passing trade. More than 30 coaches passed through the town each day. In 1789 a canal to Southampton was opened, though this was never a commercial success and closed in 1859. In 1836 the Borough established a small police force: for the most part two constables and a gaoler.

Andover was linked to Basingstoke and thus to London on its new railway to Salisbury (shortly thereafter to Exeter beyond) when Andover junction station was opened on 3 July 1854. A railway from the 1860s ran to Southampton, built on the bed of the canal, for about 100 years, until 1964. The land, together with the adjacent gasworks and P.M. Coombes woodyards, was then sold to the TSB Trust Company who later built their headquarters there. In 1883, Andover was linked to Swindon and destinations further north with the Swindon, Marlborough and Andover Railway.

The population grew from 3,304 in 1801 to 5,501 in 1871. During the 19th century the town acquired all the usual additions: a theatre in 1803, gas street lighting in 1838, a fire station and cottage hospital in 1877, a swimming pool opened in 1885 and a recreation ground opened in 1887. A water company was formed in 1875 to provide piped water to the town and a system of sewers and drains was built in 1899–1902. The public library opened in 1897. Despite this burgeoning of the amenities of the town, in 1845–1846 a notorious scandal brought to light evidence of beatings, sexual abuse and general mistreatment of workhouse inmates by the overseers. The enquiry and public reaction led indirectly to the Poor Law Act, principally involving segregation of a now-obligatory infirmary for local people from the workhouse for the able-bodied, but also better governance. The town was one of the boroughs reformed by the Municipal Reform Act 1835.

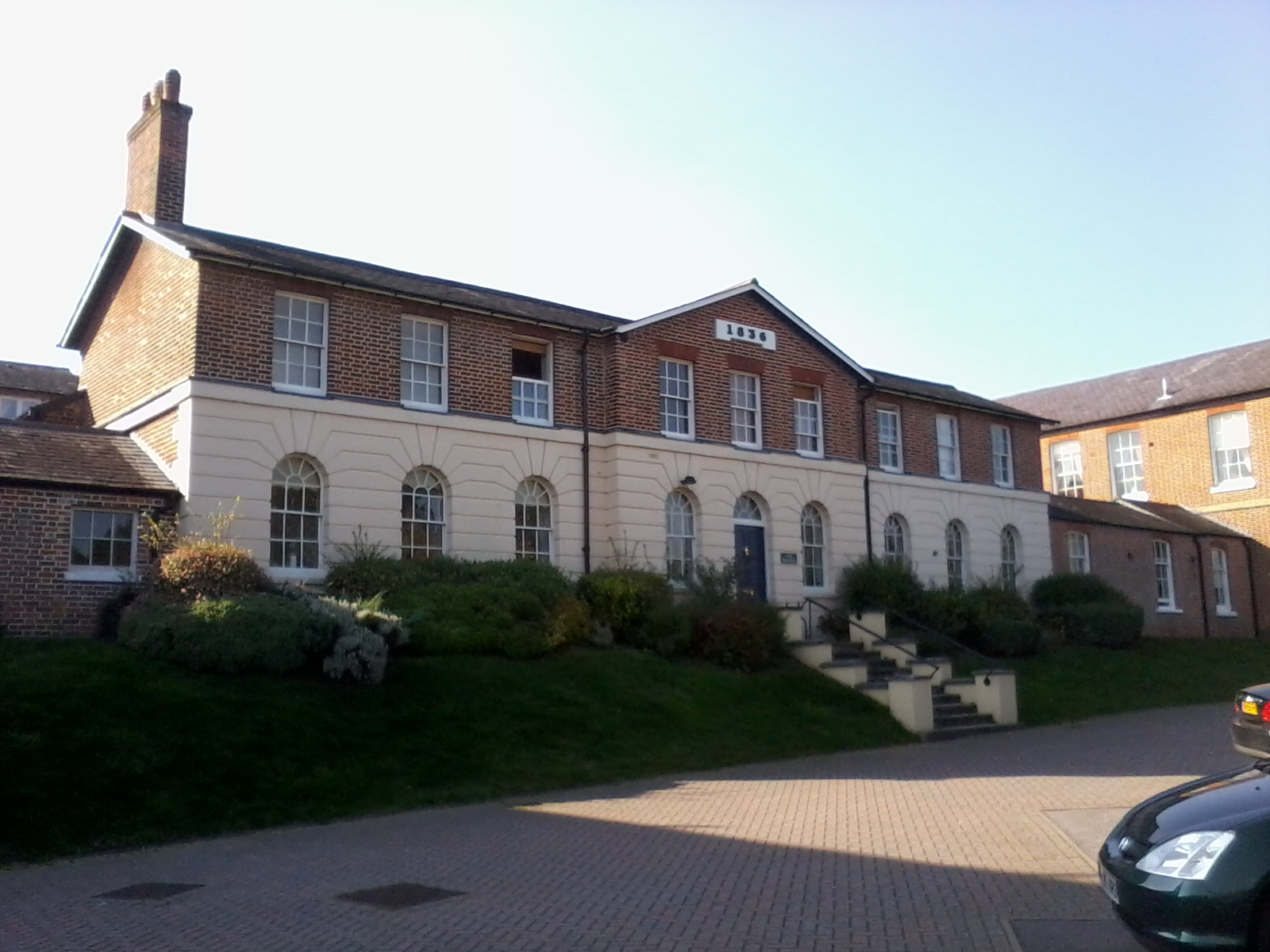
The former workhouse

The woollen industry had declined but new industries took its place. Taskers Waterloo Ironworks opened at Anna Valley in 1809 and flourished. Many examples of the machinery produced by Taskers can be seen at the Milestones Museum in Basingstoke. Andover Guildhall, which enjoys a prominent location in the High Street, opened in 1825.

=== Modern history ===
==== Employment ====
The town's largest employer is the Ministry of Defence. RAF Andover was opened on Andover Airfield, to the south of the town, during the First World War and became the site of the RAF Staff College.

In 1926, the Andover War Memorial Hospital was opened by Field Marshall Edmund Allenby. The hospital currently provides inpatient rehabilitation, day hospital services, a minor injury unit and an outpatient unit, and is operated by Hampshire Hospitals NHS Foundation Trust, with some services being provided by Southern Health NHS Foundation Trust.

In 1932, Andover gained a new industry when the printers for Kelly's Directory moved to the town.Slowly the town grew from about 11,000 and by 1960 had a population of about 17,000, because already some Londoners were being housed in the first of the council houses and flats being constructed.

During the Second World War, the RAF Staff College was the headquarters of RAF Maintenance Command, and gained a unique place in British history, as the first British military helicopter unit, the Helicopter Training School, was formed in January 1945 at RAF Andover. The airfield is no longer in use although the RAF retains a link to the area through the presence of 1213 (Andover) Squadron, Air Training Corps. When the RAF left the site became the Headquarters of the Quartermaster General and later Logistics Executive.

In 2001, the Defence Logistics Organisation (DLO) was formed and Andover became one of its major sites. Since 2012, the site has been the home of Army Headquarters. The Armed Forces Chaplaincy Centre is based locally at Amport House, as is the Army Air Corps Centre and the Museum of Army Flying at Middle Wallop.

Major industries include Twinings, Cengage, Simplyhealth and the Stannah Group. Among the proposals in the council's Borough Local Plan 2006 are plans to develop the former site of RAF Andover to Class B1, B2 and B8 uses. This site has been partially developed and is named Andover Business Park.

==== Housing ====
In the 1950s the Borough Council was approached with plans for Andover to become an overspill town for London, to build houses and take people and industry relocated from the overcrowded capital. In 1961 a plan was drawn up to expand to a population of some 47,000 by 1982, with 9,000 new homes to be built. The first new council houses were ready by 1954, and by 1981 the population had risen to 51,000. A bypass, industrial estates and a shopping centre in the town centre, called the Chantry Centre, were built.

In the 2000s, developers began extending the town with estates such as Saxon Fields, Augusta Park, Picket Twenty and more recently, Peake Way.

==== Arts and culture ====
Andover has a purpose-built arts and entertainment venue owned & managed by Test Valley Borough Council called The Lights. This hosts professional artists throughout the year. The venue has a 249 fully raked auditorium, a business suite, a dance studio and a craft studio. The Lights has attracted international artists such as Michael McIntyre.

The Town Museum (Andover Museum and Museum of the Iron Age), based in the former John Hanson Free School building, which was added in 1986 and houses the finds from excavations at nearby Danebury hillfort.

==== Politics ====
For Westminster elections, Andover is in the constituency of North West Hampshire, which since 2015 has been represented in the House of Commons by Kit Malthouse for the Conservatives.

Previously, Andover was the name of a constituency of the House of Commons of the Parliament of England from 1295 to 1307, and again from 1586, then of the Parliament of Great Britain from 1707 to 1800, and of the Parliament of the United Kingdom from 1801 to 1918. It was a parliamentary borough, represented by two Members of Parliament (MPs) until 1868, and by one member from 1868 to 1885. The name was then transferred to a county constituency electing one MP from 1885 until 1918.

There are three tiers of local government: Hampshire County Council, Test Valley Borough Council and Andover Town Council.

Three electoral divisions each elect one member of the county council – Andover South, Andover West and Andover North; the latter two extend considerable distances into the surrounding rural areas. In the south-east, the Andover Down area is part of Test Valley Central division.

Test Valley Borough Council was created in the local government reorganisation of 1974 to replace the councils of Andover borough and Andover rural district. The parish is divided into six wards, each electing two or three members of the borough council.

After the 1974 changes, Andover was an unparished area until the Andover Town Council was revived in May 2010. Since 2017, the chair of the council has had the title of town mayor. As of 2026 the council has 15 members.

== Transport ==
=== Bus ===
Buses in Andover all service Andover, Hampshire Bus Station, with a majority using this as their end/start point. It is located in the centre of town, off Western Avenue (the A3057) and West Street. It is built on the side of the multi-story car park, joined to the Chantry Centre, the local shopping centre. As of September 2024, only two bus companies service the bus station. These are: Stagecoach South, and Salisbury Reds . Hampshire Community Transport also offers a route, however this is not open to all as it has to be registered for.

Almost all areas of the town are served, and there are longer distance connections to the surrounding towns and villages. The majority of the buses in the town are operated by Stagecoach South, including inter-urban services to Basingstoke and Salisbury.

The Active8 service connects the smaller town of Tidworth with Andover and Salisbury, and is operated by both Stagecoach and Salisbury Reds, a brand of Go South Coast. This service is rare in Hampshire in that the operators provide a combined timetable and accept each other's tickets.

=== Railway ===
Andover's railway station is run by South Western Railway and is close to the town's centre. Trains run to Salisbury, Yeovil Junction, Exeter St Davids, Basingstoke and London Waterloo (with a usual intermediate stop at Woking) and some stopping services to places such as Whitchurch.

In April 2017, the Department for Transport predicted that train journey times between Andover and London Waterloo would be reduced by nearly 20 per cent after awarding the South Western franchise to South Western Railway; journey times to/from Waterloo to be cut by about 11 to 13 minutes from late 2018.

Andover previously had a second station, Andover Town, in the town centre on the Andover to Redbridge Line. The line and the station closed to passengers in September 1964 as part of the Beeching Axe.

=== Roads ===
The A303, a main route from London to South West England, essentially bounds the town to the south. The M4 motorway, to the north, can be reached by way of the A34 trunk road, which continues to Birmingham; or via Marlborough, Wiltshire.

== Demographics ==
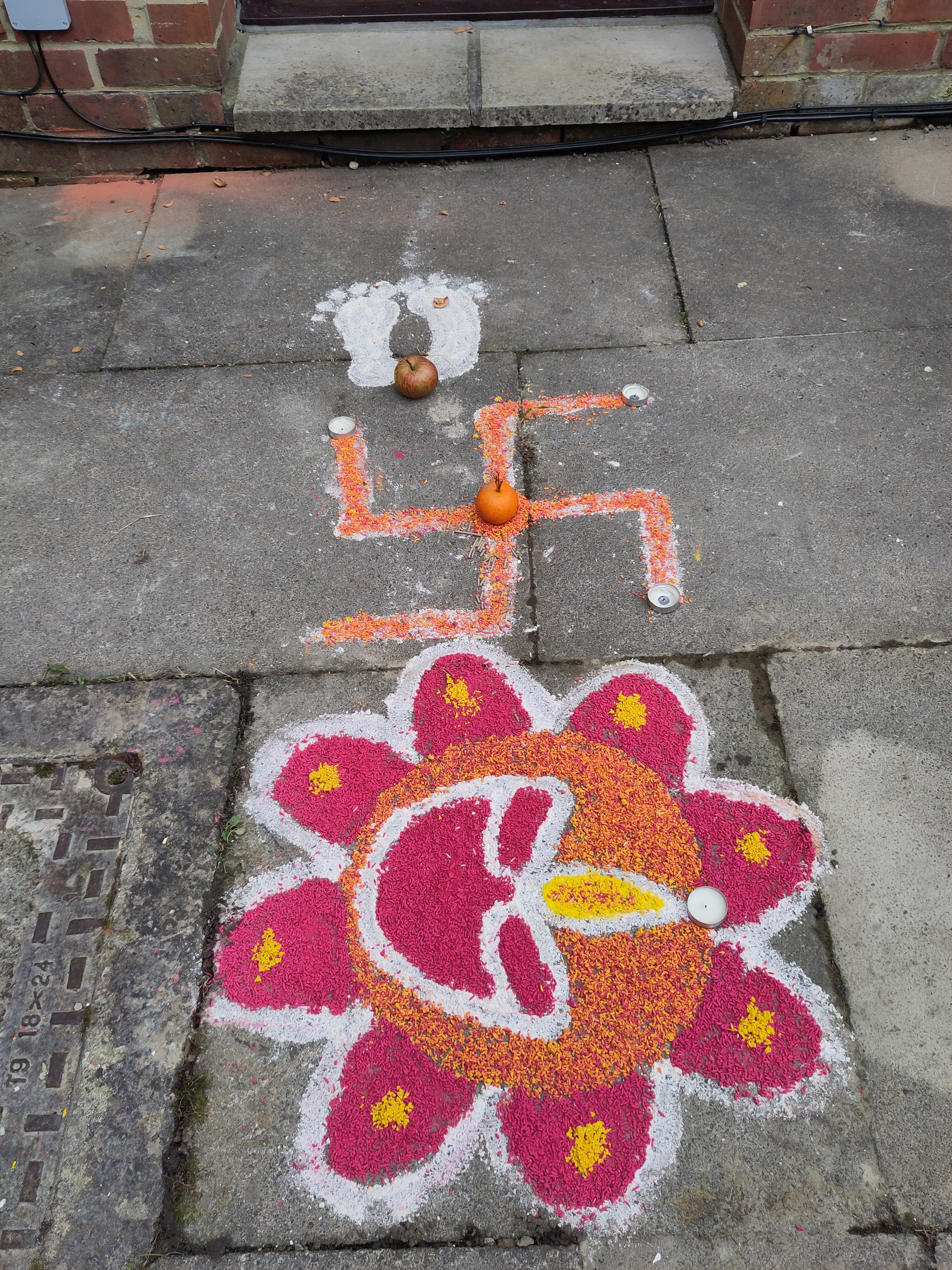
Rangoli in front of a Nepalese household in Andover

As of the 2024 Andover Town Profile, Andover has a population of 50,887 with an estimated increase of 5.6% (53,715) predicted by 2027.

Ethnic Groups 2024	%
White British	90.9
White	4.3
Asian	2.1
Black	0.6
Other	0.3

There is a growing Nepalese population in Andover, reflecting local army connections with the Brigade of Gurkhas.

== Media ==
Local TV coverage is provided by BBC South and ITV Meridian.

For BBC Local Radio, the town is served by both BBC Radio Solent on 96.1 MHz FM and BBC Radio Berkshire on 104.1 MHz FM. Andover Radio is a community radio station on 95.9 MHz FM, first licensed in 2016. The Independent Local Radio station for the area is Greatest Hits Radio Berkshire & North Hampshire, which broadcasts national and regional music programmes. The licence was first held by Andover Sound, then by The Breeze between 2012 and 2020.

The weekly newspaper for the town and the surrounding area is the Andover Advertiser, founded in 1858 and now owned by Newsquest.

== Andover Vision ==
Andover Vision is a partnership of Andover's residents, community groups, business and public bodies. In April 2017, a strategy document set out the ambitions for the town and its future over the next 20 years. The strategy was shaped by local people through extensive consultation and brought together by the Vision partnership. The ambitions will influence how Andover manages the changing environment for the benefit of the whole community as well as providing a way in which local people can play an active role in the future of their town. The five themes for the Andover Vision are:

- Being part of a connected community
- Having a great green environment
- Being part of a thriving town centre
- Supporting business, jobs and skills in the town
- Access to great health

Each of the ambitions has a set of 'big ideas'. The big ideas describe what the partnership will work on together for the town and inform the projects that the partnership will take forward through its action plan. The document will also be used as a basis to attract new funding and new opportunities to the town and a guide for partners for their future policies and strategies relating to Andover.

The previous 20-year Andover Vision Strategy, launched in 2005, delivered projects including The Lights Theatre, Odeon cinema, Andover Business Park, the Chapel Arts Centre and events such as the Graduation ceremonies.

== Mills and milling ==
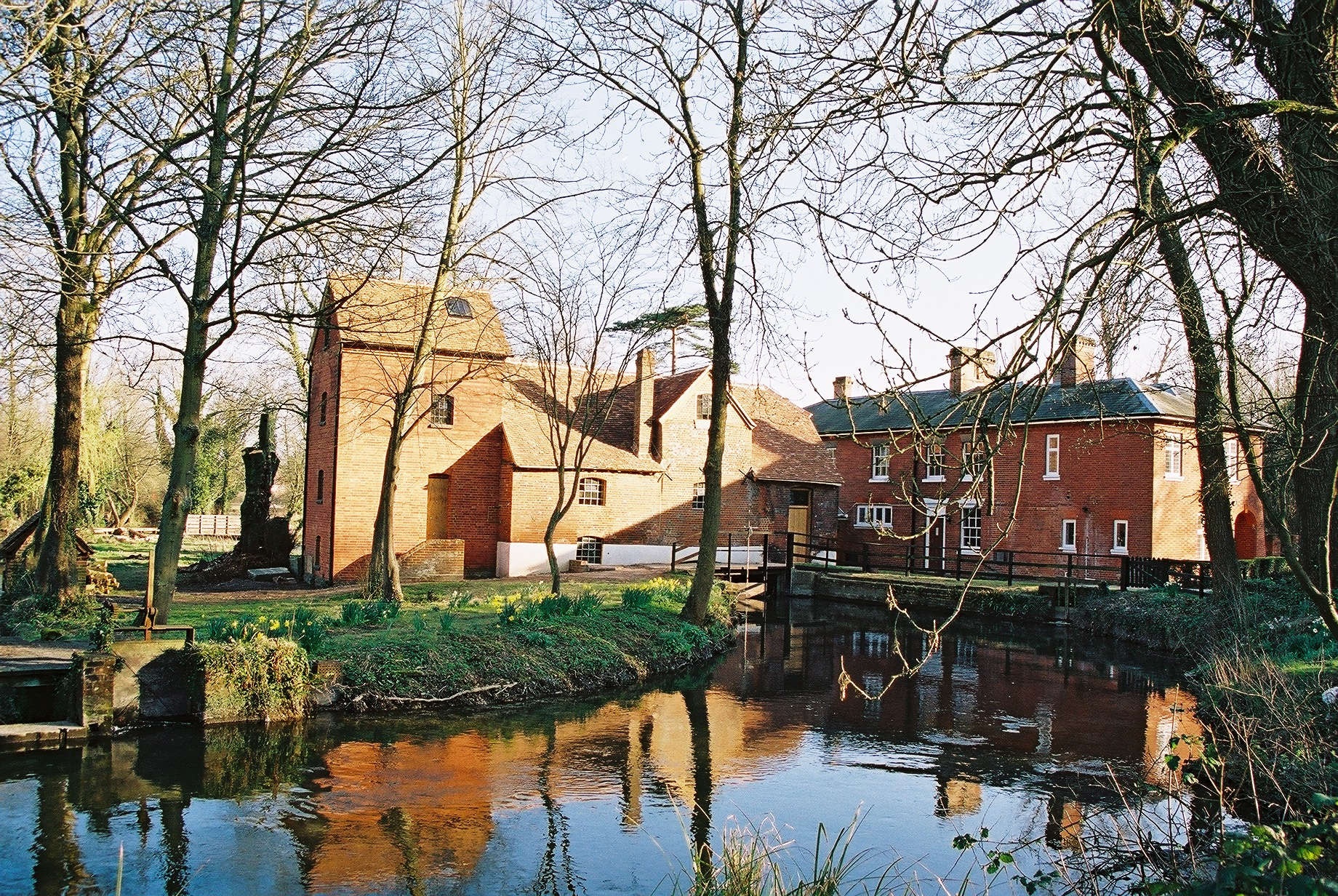
Rooksbury Mill and Mill House

Watermills have formed an important part in Andover's history. The Domesday Book of 1086 recorded six mills.

Rooksbury Mill is one of the few surviving mill buildings in Andover. The existence of Rooksbury Mill is first recorded by name in the 17th century. Functioning as a flour mill, it has passed through a succession of owners. Milling ceased in the early 20th century, after which the mill building went through a series of uses including being used as a small theatre. Test Valley Borough Council sold the building in 2002, shortly after it had been devastated following an arson attack. The new owners, Anthony and Sarah de Sigley, restored the building in 2003, rebuilding much of the original structure.

A large flour mill, McDougalls, is close to the railway station.

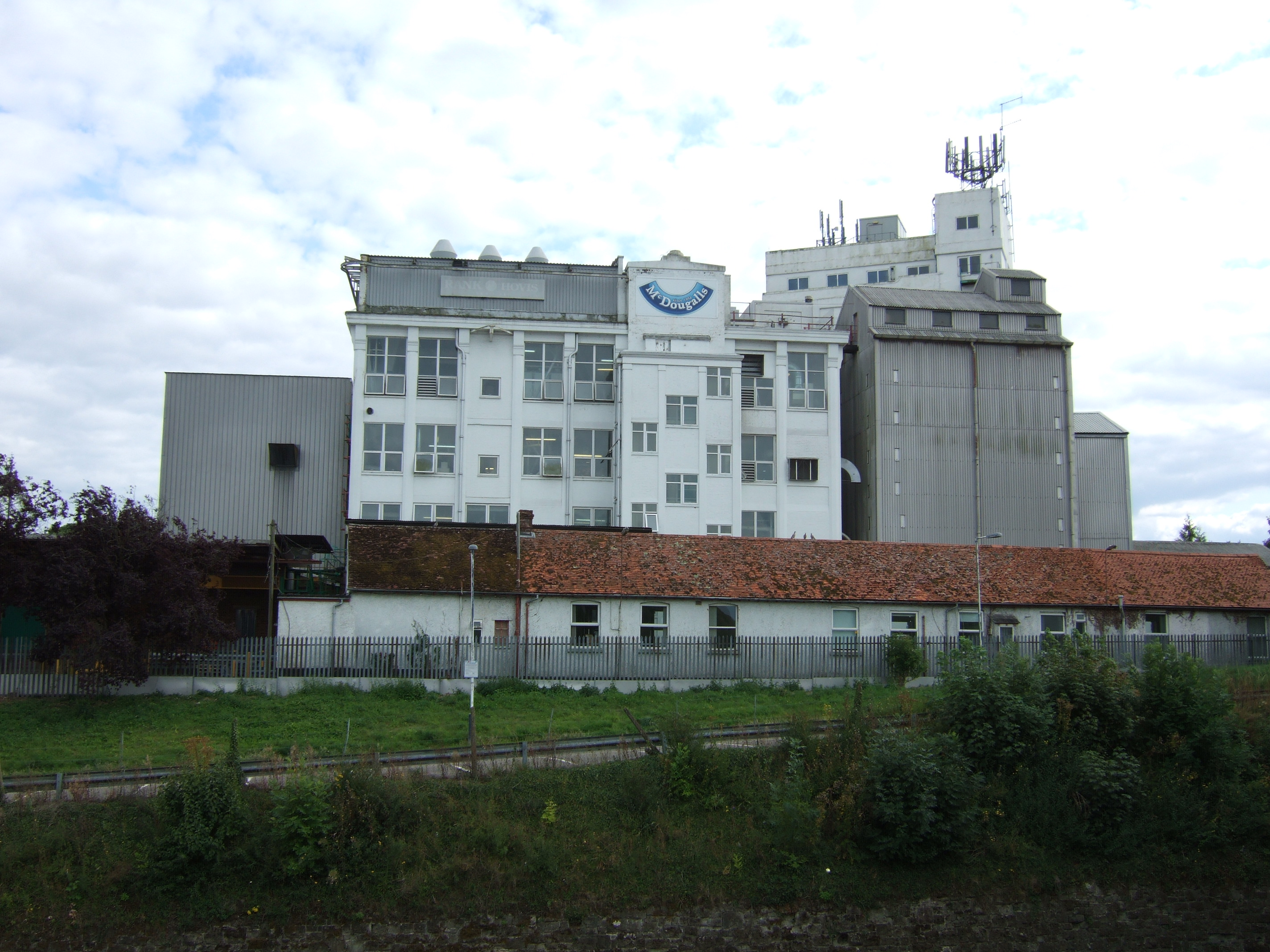
McDougalls Flour Mill, Millway Road, Andover

== Climate ==
Andover, in common with much of the UK, experiences a maritime climate type, reflected in its limited temperature range and lack of rainy/dry seasons, although rainfall does tend to peak in winter and reach a minimum in summer. The nearest met office weather station to Andover is Leckford, about 5 miles (8 km) south of the town centre.

The absolute maximum temperature recorded was 34.7 °C (94.5 °F) during August 1990. In an average year, the hottest day will achieve a temperature of 29.0 °C (84.2 °F). In total 12.8 days should have a maximum temperature of 25.1 °C (77.2 °F) or above.

The absolute minimum temperature recorded was −15.6 °C (3.9 °F) during December 1960. In an average year the coldest night will fall to −7.5 °C (18.5 °F). In total 46.6 nights should register an air frost.

Total rainfall averages 805 mm (31.7 in) per year, with at least 1 mm (0.039 in) falling on 124 days. All averages refer to the 1971–2000 observation period.

Climate data for Middle Wallop, (Note: Weather station is located 6.0 miles (9.7 km) from the Andover town centre.) (1991–2020 normals, extremes 1984–present)
Month	Jan	Feb	Mar	Apr	May	Jun	Jul	Aug	Sep	Oct	Nov	Dec	Year
Record high °C (°F)	15.5 (59.9)	18.1 (64.6)	21.8 (71.2)	26.1 (79.0)	27.8 (82.0)	32.1 (89.8)	35.2 (95.4)	34.9 (94.8)	30.7 (87.3)	26.8 (80.2)	17.4 (63.3)	15.2 (59.4)	35.2 (95.4)
Mean daily maximum °C (°F)	7.8 (46.0)	8.3 (46.9)	10.9 (51.6)	13.9 (57.0)	17.2 (63.0)	20.1 (68.2)	22.2 (72.0)	21.8 (71.2)	19.1 (66.4)	14.9 (58.8)	10.9 (51.6)	8.2 (46.8)	14.6 (58.3)
Daily mean °C (°F)	4.8 (40.6)	5.1 (41.2)	7.1 (44.8)	9.4 (48.9)	12.5 (54.5)	15.3 (59.5)	17.3 (63.1)	17.1 (62.8)	14.7 (58.5)	11.3 (52.3)	7.7 (45.9)	5.2 (41.4)	10.6 (51.1)
Mean daily minimum °C (°F)	1.8 (35.2)	1.8 (35.2)	3.2 (37.8)	4.8 (40.6)	7.7 (45.9)	10.4 (50.7)	12.3 (54.1)	12.4 (54.3)	10.2 (50.4)	7.7 (45.9)	4.4 (39.9)	2.2 (36.0)	6.6 (43.9)
Record low °C (°F)	−10.1 (13.8)	−10.5 (13.1)	−6.3 (20.7)	−3.7 (25.3)	−1.2 (29.8)	1.4 (34.5)	4.9 (40.8)	3.9 (39.0)	0.9 (33.6)	−3.5 (25.7)	−7.6 (18.3)	−10.2 (13.6)	−10.5 (13.1)
Average precipitation mm (inches)	88.3 (3.48)	64.7 (2.55)	59.1 (2.33)	59.0 (2.32)	49.6 (1.95)	52.6 (2.07)	54.2 (2.13)	57.1 (2.25)	58.7 (2.31)	90.4 (3.56)	96.7 (3.81)	89.0 (3.50)	819.4 (32.26)
Average precipitation days (≥ 1.0 mm)	12.5	10.5	9.6	9.8	9.0	8.4	9.1	9.0	8.8	12.1	13.1	12.2	124.2
Source 1: Met Office
Source 2: Starlings Roost Weather

== Education ==
The town is served by state, independent and special schools. Secondary education is provided by three state schools. John Hanson Community School, formerly Andover Grammar School, which dates back to the 16th century and is the oldest school in the town, Harrow Way Community School and Winton Community Academy. Rookwood School, an independent day and boarding school, caters for pupils aged 3 to 18. Another local independent school is Farleigh School, a Catholic prep school. There is one sixth form provision, Andover College, formerly known as Cricklade College.

== Notable people ==
- Nigel Spackman was a local football player who began his career for Andover before moving to AFC Bournemouth and Chelsea. From there, he enjoyed a successful career culminating with winning the English league championship with Liverpool, and numerous Scottish league and cup winners medals with Rangers. Since retiring, he has ventured into club management as well as becoming a television football pundit.
- Bill Rawlings was another Andoverian who began his career at the club. He went on to join Southampton in 1919 where he had a successful career scoring 175 goals in 327 league appearances, making him their third all-time goalscorer behind Mick Channon and Matthew Le Tissier. He also won two England caps in 1922 against Wales and Scotland respectively. He also played for Manchester United and Port Vale.
- Lucinda Green, champion equestrian and journalist who won a silver medal at the 1984 Summer Olympics as well as two world titles, was born in Andover in 1953.
- Kate Howey, judoka, competed at four Olympic games, winning a silver medal in 2000 and a bronze medal in 1992. Howey was born in Andover in 1973. In 2004 she carried the British flag at the opening ceremony in Athens.
- Ronnie Bond, Pete Staples and Reg Presley(1941-2013) of the Troggs, a rock band who had a number of hits in Britain and the United States such as "Wild Thing" and "Love Is All Around", all lived in Andover.
- The eminent 19th-century surgeon William Morrant Baker was also born in the town. He was best known for describing the condition Baker's cyst as well as being a lecturer, surgeon and governor at St. Bartholomew's Hospital.
- Sam Baker, novelist and editor in chief of Red Magazine, and previously editor of Cosmopolitan and Just Seventeen among other women's magazines, lived in the area as a child and went to Andover's Anton School, Winton School and Cricklade Sixth Form College.
- Author and winemaker Cyril Berry lived in the town and served as its mayor in 1972–1973.
- Campaigner and broadcaster Katie Piper was brought up in Andover and retains strong links to the town.
- TV Presenter Richard Arnold was born in Hampshire. He grew up in Charlton, Andover, and went to Portway Junior School in Andover.
- Roger Panes, a member of the Exclusive Brethren Christian evangelical cult, killed his family and himself in Andover in 1974.
- Lord Denning, judge and Master of the Rolls, attended Andover Grammar School from 1 October 1909.
- Hanson Turner is a recipient of the Victoria Cross.
- Basil Hayles (1916–2007), first-class cricketer and British Army officer
- Joanna Jensen (born 1970), businesswoman specializing in skin care

== Sport ==
- Cricket: Andover Cricket Club play in the Southern Premier Cricket League.
- Football: The town has two Non-League football clubs, Andover New Street F.C. which play at Foxcotte Park and Andover Town F.C. who play at the Portway Stadium. Andover was home to former Southern League side, Andover Football Club, which was dissolved in the summer of 2011. Andover Lions F.C., a new club formed shortly afterwards, competed in the Hampshire League 2004 and Hampshire Premier League between 2011 and 2017.
- Hockey: Andover is home to Andover Hockey Club.
- Rugby Union: Andover R.F.C. are based in the town.
- Cycling: Andover is home to the Andover Wheelers.
- Triathlon: Andover is home to the Andover Triathlon Club.
- Archery: Andover is home to the Andover Archer Club.
- Lawn Bowls: Bowls has been played in Andover since 1913.
- BMX: Andover is home to the Andover BMX club located at Charlton Leisure Park.
- Table tennis: Andover is home to Andover Table Tennis Association, located at John Hanson Community School.

== Twinning ==
Andover is twinned with the towns of Redon in France, Goch in Germany, and Andover, Massachusetts in the United States.

== See also ==
- Amport House
- Andover workhouse scandal
- The Angel Inn – a 15th-century medieval coaching inn and the oldest building in Andover
- Army Air Corps
- Caldera UK (1996–1999), developers of OpenDOS/DR-DOS and WebSpyder

== Arms ==
Coat of arms of Andover, Hampshire

Notes
Originally granted to Andover Borough Council on 4 April 1949.
Crest
A stag Or resting the dexter forehoof on a lozenge Argent charged with a fleur-de-lis Azure.
Torse
A wreath of the colours.
Escutcheon
Argent on a mount Vert in front of an oak tree fructed Proper a lion statant guardant Gules.
Supporters
On the dexter side a lion guardant Gules and on the sinister side an eagle wings elevated and addorsed Azure.
Motto
Constantia Basis Virtutum (Steadfastness is the Foundation of the Virtues)
