= Andover College (Hampshire) =

Coordinates: 51.21078°N 1.48184°W

Andover College Hampshire
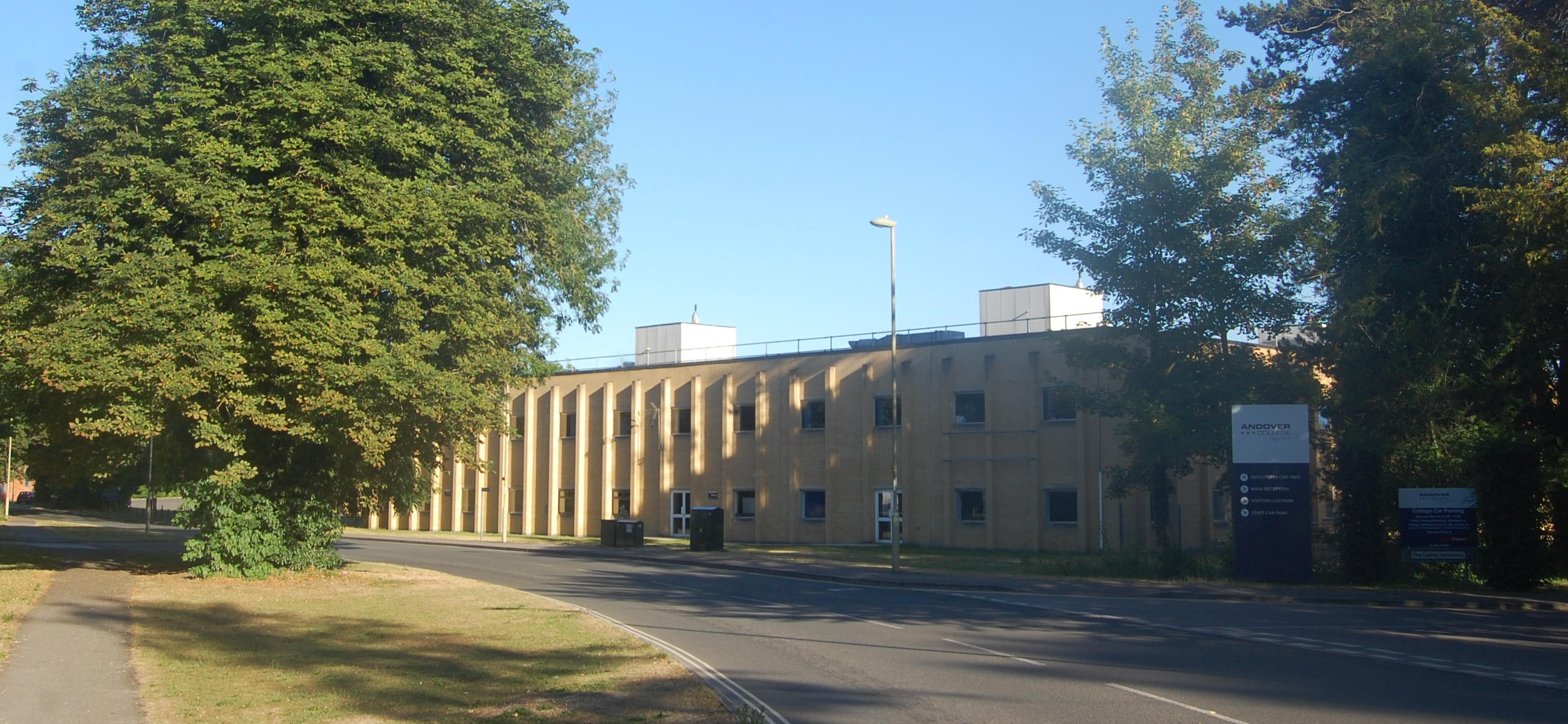

Location
- Charlton Road; Andover, Hampshire, SP10 1EJ; England

Information
- Type: Further education college
- Established: 1975
- Local authority: Hampshire County Council
- Gender: Coeducational
- Age: 16+
- Website: http://www.andover.ac.uk

Andover College, formerly known as Sparsholt College, is a Further Education community college in Andover, Hampshire. It provides a range of academic and vocational courses to school leavers, adults, employers and the wider local community. Previously known as Cricklade College, the college changed its name following a merger with Sparsholt College Hampshire in 2007, forming one of the largest colleges in Hampshire. Andover College is a campus of Sparsholt College Hampshire.

== Notable alumni ==
- Jamie Hince, musician
- Catherine Merridale, historian
- Robert Steadman, classical music composer
- James Tomlinson, cricketer
