= Joanna Jensen =

British businesswoman

Joanna Jensen (born 14 May 1970) is a British businesswoman. She is the founder of a family skincare brand, Childs Farm.

== Early life and career ==
Joanna Jensen is the CEO of Childs Farm Ltd, a UK-based skincare brand.

She worked as an estate agent, then moved to Hong Kong to work in investment banking and became a head of account management at WI Carr.

== Childs Farm ==
In 2010, Jensen founded Childs Farm, a natural skincare brand, which she started after treating her daughter's eczema with a self-made sensitive skin solution. The Childs Farm brand was introduced in UK retail in 2014, and in 2018, she also established her brand in Australia. In 2022, Childs Farm was awarded B-Corp status, and in the same year, she sold 91.5% of her business to PZ Cussons PLC for £40 million.

Awards

- Mother & Baby: Best sun protection cream for our CF50+ SPF roll on, Best bathtime products for our Baby bedtime bubbles, Best baby skincare range / product for our baby and child range for four years running
- Ocado: Rising star award
- Thames Valley SME 100 Growth Award (over £10m) 2020
- The Grocer Awards: SME Brand of the year 2019
- British Small Business Awards: Female Entrepreneur of the Year 2018
- Inspire Business Awards: Entrepreneur of the Year 2018
- IGD: Small Business Award 2018

== Personal life ==
Jensen has two daughters and lives in Hampshire.

Jensen has been engaged in various donations, such as providing £750,000 worth of hand cream to NHS nurses for skin problems during the COVID-19 pandemic, which occurs due to constant handwashing, and offering gifts to children who are admitted in hospitals around Christmas.

== Charity work ==
Horses have been a permanent feature in Jensen's life and the charities she actively supports reflect this passion.

Jensen's involvement with the British Paralympic Association (BPA) inspired her to offer further support to a charity that relies heavily on donations to bring the National Team together for training and getting them to events around the world. In 2019, she became a founder member of The Parallel Club, a group of individuals that commit to helping the Paralympians of the future obtain the equipment, support and coaching they need to become winners. In 2023, Jensen became the club's Chairman.

Riding for the Disabled Association (RDA) has been a beneficiary of Childs Farm since the company launched in 2011. Jensen is proud to have donated to the construction of the charity's HQ in Worcestershire, as well its annual National Championships and Achievement Awards.

Through RDA, Jensen met Natasha Baker OBE, one of the UK's leading Paralympic Dressage riders. In 2018, Baker needed help in purchasing a horse for the Tokyo 2020 Paralympic Games. Jensen did not hesitate and helped her to secure her new ride, Lottie (Keystone Dawn Chorus). Baker went onto win a gold and two silver medals in the Games that were eventually held in 2021.

== Advisory and Mentoring ==
Jensen holds influential roles across several boards, where she champions innovative businesses, supports female-founded ventures, and fosters sustainable growth in diverse industries.

- Enterprise Investment Scheme, Chair
- Buy Women Built, Advisory board member
- Imperial College London Venture Mentoring Service, Mentor
- The British Beauty Council, Advisory board member

== Writing ==
Jensen writes a regular business column for The Sunday Times. In September 2025, she published her first book, Making Business Child's Play: How to Build a Winning Brand (Kogan Page), drawing on her experience building Childs Farm into a market-leading brand to offer guidance for entrepreneurs and small business owners on developing and scaling a consumer brand.

Awards

- The book was named a finalist in the Business: Entrepreneurship & Small Business category of the 2026 National Indie Excellence Awards, and received a Distinguished Favorite honour in the same category at the 2026 Independent Press Awards.
