= Andover Cricket Club =

Cricket club based in Andover, Hampshire

Andover Cricket Club is an English cricket club based in Andover, Hampshire. Originally formed in 1865, the club has been at its present ground at London Road, Andover since the 1930s. The club runs four senior teams, with the 1st XI competing in the Southern Premier Cricket League, whilst the 2nd, 3rd and 4th teams play in the Hampshire Cricket League. In addition to the senior squads, Andover Cricket Club has a Youth section with over 200 members subscribed. The club achieved ECB Clubmark accreditation in 2007.

Andover were founder members of the Hampshire Cricket League in 1973, and finished runners-up in the first two years of the league's existence, but had to wait until 1997 for their first championship win.
