= Jansen (surname) =

- Language: Dutch

Origin
- Meaning: "son of Jan"

Other names
- Variant forms: Di Giovanni, Giannopoulos, Hovannesian, Hovannesyan, Hovhannisian, Hovhannisyan, I'Anson, Ioannidis, Ioannou, Ivanenko, Ivanov, Ivanović, Ivanovski, Janavičius, Jānsons, Janowicz, Jansons/Jansone, Janssen, Jensen, Johansson, Johnston, Johnstone, Jonavičius, Jonson, Jonsson, Johnson, Johnsson, Jones, Jovanović, Juánez

Jansen (Dutch pronunciation: [ˈjɑn.sə(n)]) is a Dutch/Flemish and Low German patronymic surname meaning son of Jan, a common derivative of Johannes. It is equivalent to the English surname Johnson. The near homonyms "Jensen" and "Jansson" are its Danish, Norwegian and Swedish counterparts.

Jansen is a very common surname in the Dutch-language area. Jansen is one of the most common names in the Netherlands and the most common when combined with variant spelling Janssen. In Belgium, the variant Janssens is the second most common name.

== People named Jansen ==
- Ada Jansen (born 1942), Dutch politician
- Ana Jansen (1798–1869), Brazilian politician
- Adam Jansen, American archivist
- Adrienne Jansen (born 1947), New Zealand author and educator
- Alandson Jansen da Silva (born 1988), Belgian-Brazilian footballer
- Alexandre Jansen Da Silva (born 1987), Belgian-Brazilian footballer
- Alf-Inge Jansen (born 1939), Norwegian political scientist and politician
- Amund Grøndahl Jansen (born 1994), Norwegian cyclist
- Anco Jansen (born 1989), Dutch football forward
- Angela Jansen (born 1929), American artist
- Annemiek Padt-Jansen (1921–2007), Dutch harpist and Labour Party politician
- Arne Jansen (born 1975), German jazz guitarist
- Astrid Jansen (born 1950s), Dutch figure skater
- Barend Coenraad Petrus Jansen (1884–1962), Dutch chemist and biochemist
- Bernt Jansen (table tennis) (born 1949), German table tennis player
- Birger Jansen (1948–2016), Norwegian ice hockey player and sailor
- Cas Jansen (born 1977), Dutch actor
- Catherine Jansen (born 1950), American photographer
- Chris Jansen (born 1966), Dutch politician
- Ciska Jansen (born 1944), Dutch track and field athlete
- Cornelius Jansen (1585–1638), Dutch theologian (Jansenism)
- Cornelius Jansen (Bishop of Ghent) (1510–1576), Flemish religious leader (Jansen of Ghent)
- Dan Jansen (born 1964), American speed skater
- Dan Jansen (sledge hockey), Canadian ice sledge hockey player
- Daniel Jansen (basketball) (born 1994), American basketball player
- Daniel Jansen Van Doorn (born 1990), Canadian volleyball player
- Daniëlle Jansen (born 1970), Dutch politician
- Danny Jansen (born 1995), American baseball player
- Dave Jansen (born 1979), American mixed martial artist
- David Jansen (born 1987), German football forward
- DeWitt Clinton Jansen (1840–1894), American hotelier and politician and judge in Shanghai
- Dolf Jansen (born 1963), Dutch comedian and radio presenter
- Duan Jansen (born 2000), South African cricketer
- Ea Jansen (1921–2005), Estonian historian
- Eelco Jansen (born 1969), Dutch baseball player
- Einar Jansen (1893–1960), Norwegian historian, genealogist and archivist
- Ellen Jansen (born 1992), Dutch football forward
- Emily Jansen (born 1977), Australian amputee skier
- Eric Jansen (born 2000), German footballer
- Ernest George Jansen (1881–1959), South African politician
- Ernst Jansen Steur (born 1945), Dutch neurologist
- Eystein Jansen (born 1953), Norwegian marine geologist
- Floor Jansen (born 1981), Dutch singer
- Floris Jansen (born 1962), Dutch cricketer
- Fons Jansen (1925–2001), Dutch comedian
- Freek Jansen (born 1992), Dutch politician
- Froukje Jansen (born 1976), Dutch gymnast and television presenter
- Gaite Jansen (born 1991), Dutch actress
- Geert Jan Jansen (born 1943), Dutch art forger
- George Jansen (fl. 1950s), American test pilot
- Gérard Jansen (born 1964), Dutch draughts player
- Guy Jansen (1935-2019), New Zealand author and musician
- Haakon Jansen (1900–1968), Norwegian long-distance runner
- Hanneke Jansen (born c. 1970), Dutch computational chemist
- Hans Jansen (1931–2019), Dutch theologian and scholar of anti-semitism
- Hans Jansen (1942–2015), Dutch politician and scholar of contemporary Islam
- Hans-Jürgen Jansen (born 1941), German footballer
- Harm Jansen (born 1967), Dutch racing cyclist
- Harrie Jansen (born 1947), Dutch racing cyclist
- Harry August Jansen (1883–1955), Danish-born American magician
- Heinrich Jansen (1625–1667), Danish Baroque painter
- Hermann Jansen (1869–1945), German architect and urban planner
- Hernán Jansen (born 1985), Venezuelan fencer
- Huub Jansen (born 1962), Dutch cricket umpire
- Igor Jansen (born 2004), Brazilian actor
- Irene Jansen (born 1983), Dutch singer
- J. J. Jansen (born 1986), American football long snapper
- Jacques Jansen (1913–2002), French singer
- Jan Jansen (cyclist) (born 1945), Dutch cyclist
- Jan Jansen (historian) (born 1962), Dutch historian
- Jan B. Jansen (1898–1984), Norwegian professor of medicine
- Jan Helge Jansen (born 1937), Norwegian politician
- Jan K. S. Jansen (1931–2011), Norwegian professor of medicine
- Janine Jansen (born 1978), Dutch violinist
- Jarrad Jansen (born 1995), Australian rules footballer
- Jennette Jansen (born 1968), Dutch Paralympian
- Jens Jonas Jansen (1844–1912), Norwegian priest
- Jochem Jansen (born 1990), Dutch football defender
- Joeri Jansen (born 1979), Belgian middle-distance runner
- Johan Jansen (born 1989), Dutch football goalkeeper
- Johann Joseph Jansen (1825–1849), German socialist revolutionary
- Johannes Jansen (1829–1891), German historian and priest
- Johannes Jansen (mayor) (1665–1734), Mayor of New York City from 1725 to 1726
- Johannes Henricus Gerardus Jansen (1868–1936), Dutch Archbishop
- John Jansen (politician) (born 1947), Canadian (British Columbia) politician
- John Jansen (record producer) (born 1947), American recording engineer and music producer
- John Jansen (rugby league) (born 1955), Australian rugby league player
- John Jansen (water polo) (born 1963), Dutch water polo player
- Jon Jansen (born 1976), American football offensive tackle.
- Jonas Jansen (1900–1975), Norwegian archivist
- Jones Ralfy Jansen (born 1992), Indonesian badminton player
- Jordan Jansen (born 1998), Australian pop singer
- Jos Jansen (born 1954), Belgian rallycross driver
- Karl Jansen (1908–1061), German weightlifter
- Kathleen Jansen, American (Michigan) judge
- Kati Jansen (born 1934), German freestyle swimmer
- Kenley Jansen (born 1987), Dutch baseball player
- Kevin Jansen (born 1992), Dutch football midfielder
- Larry Jansen (1920–2009), American baseball player
- Laura Jansen (born 1977), Dutch-born American singer-songwriter
- Laura Jansen van Vuuren (born c.1958), South African Navy admiral
- Lauren Jansen (born 1992), Australian basketball player
- Leen Jansen (1930–2014), Dutch boxer
- Leo Jansen (1930–1980), Dutch painter
- Leoni Jansen (born 1955), Dutch singer
- Louise Mai Jansen (born 1984), Danish swimmer
- Lynette Jansen, South African racing cyclist
- Maarten Jansen (born 1952), Dutch archaeologist and Mesoamericanist
- Mallory Jansen (born 1989), Australian actress
- Marcell Jansen (born 1985), German footballer
- Marco Jansen (born 2000), South African cricketer
- Marco Jansen van Vuren (born 1996), South African rugby player
- Marcus Jansen (born 1968), American painter in Germany
- Marie Jansen (1857–1914), American actress
- Marijke Jansen (born 1944), Dutch tennis player
- Marius Jansen (1922–2000), American Japanese history academic
- Mark Jansen (born 1978), Dutch metal musician
- Mark Jansen (politician), American (Michigan) politician
- Marlon Jansen (born 1980), South African cricket umpire
- Matt Jansen (born 1977), English footballer
- Maximilian Jansen (born 1993), German footballer
- Maya Jansen (born 1994), American tennis player
- Mex Jansen (born 2006), Dutch racing driver
- Michael Jansen (born 1984), Dutch footballer
- Michel Jansen (born 1966), Dutch football manager
- Misael Silva Jansen (born 1987), Brazilian football striker
- Monifa Jansen (born 1993), Curaçaoan beauty pageant
- Monique Jansen (born 1978), Dutch discus thrower
- Nils Jansen (born 1959), Norwegian jazz musician
- Paige Jansen-Nichols, American Jewelry designer and business executive
- Patrick Jansen (1920–2003), Indian hockey player
- Paulus Jansen (born 1954), Dutch politician
- Pearl Jansen (born 1950), South African beauty queen and singer
- Per Jansen (1941–2022), Norwegian stage and film actor
- Peter Jansen (art educator) (born 1938), Dutch artist
- Peter Jansen (politician) (1852–1923), American (Nebraska) politician
- Peter Jansen (rower), New Zealand rower
- Petter Jansen (born 1955), Norwegian business executive
- Philip Jansen (born 1967), British businessman
- Pierre Jansen (1930–2015), French film scores composer
- Pieter Jansen (born 1995), South African rugby player
- Pieter Jansen van Vuren (born 1991), South African rugby player
- Querelle Jansen (born 1985), Dutch model
- Quint Jansen (born 1990), Dutch footballer
- Rassie Jansen van Vuuren (born 1985), South African rugby player
- Ray Jansen (1889–1934), American baseball player
- Renate Jansen (born 1990), Dutch football striker
- Robbie Jansen (1949–2010), South African musician
- Rocco Jansen (born 1986), South African rugby player
- Roeliff Jansen (1602–1637), Norwegian settler in New Netherland
- Rogier Jansen (born 1984), Dutch basketball player
- Ronald Jansen (born 1963), Dutch hockey player
- Ross Jansen (1932–2010), New Zealand politician, mayor of Hamilton
- Roy Jansen (born 1950), Norwegian ice hockey player
- Rudolf Jansen (1940–2024), Dutch pianist
- Rudy Jansen (born 1979), Dutch footballer
- Sacharias Jansen (1585–1632), Dutch spectacle-maker associated with the invention of the telescope and microscope
- Sandra Jansen (born 1963), Canadian (Alberta) politician
- Sharon Jansen, New Zealand architect
- Sigurd Jansen (born 1932), Norwegian composer, pianist and conductor
- Stefan Jansen (born 1972), Dutch footballer
- Steve Jansen (born 1959), English musician, composer and record produce
- Steve Jansen (soccer) (born 1967), Canadian soccer player
- Steven Jansen (unknown birth year), Dutch EDM producer, half of Lucas & Steve
- Susan Estelle Jansen, American television producer and writer
- Theo Jansen (born 1948), Dutch artist
- Theo Jansen van Rensburg (born 1967), South African rugby player
- Therese Jansen Bartolozzi (ca.1770–1843), German pianist
- Tom Jansen (born 1945), Dutch movie actor
- Torsten Jansen (born 1976), German handballer
- Torsten Stiig Jansen (born 1963), Danish journalist
- Ulli Jansen (1931–2006), German ice hockey player
- Uwe Jansen, German rugby league coach
- Victor Jansen (born 2001), Brazilian politician
- Wim Jansen (1946–2022), Dutch footballer
- Wolfgang Jansen (1938–1988), German actor
- Yibbi Jansen (born 1999), Dutch field hockey player

== As a patronym ==
- Hendrik Jansen van Barrefelt (c. 1520 – c. 1594), Dutch Christian mystic
- Peter Jansen Wessel Tordenskiold (1690–1720), Norwegian naval hero
- Rutger Jansen Bleecker (1675–1756), Mayor of Albany, New York

== Fictional characters ==
- Cam Jansen, eponymic character of a mystery book series by David A. Adler
- Tek Jansen, fictional character featured on The Colbert Report
