= Nærsnes =

Human settlement in Norway

Coordinates: 59°45′36″N 10°30′36″E

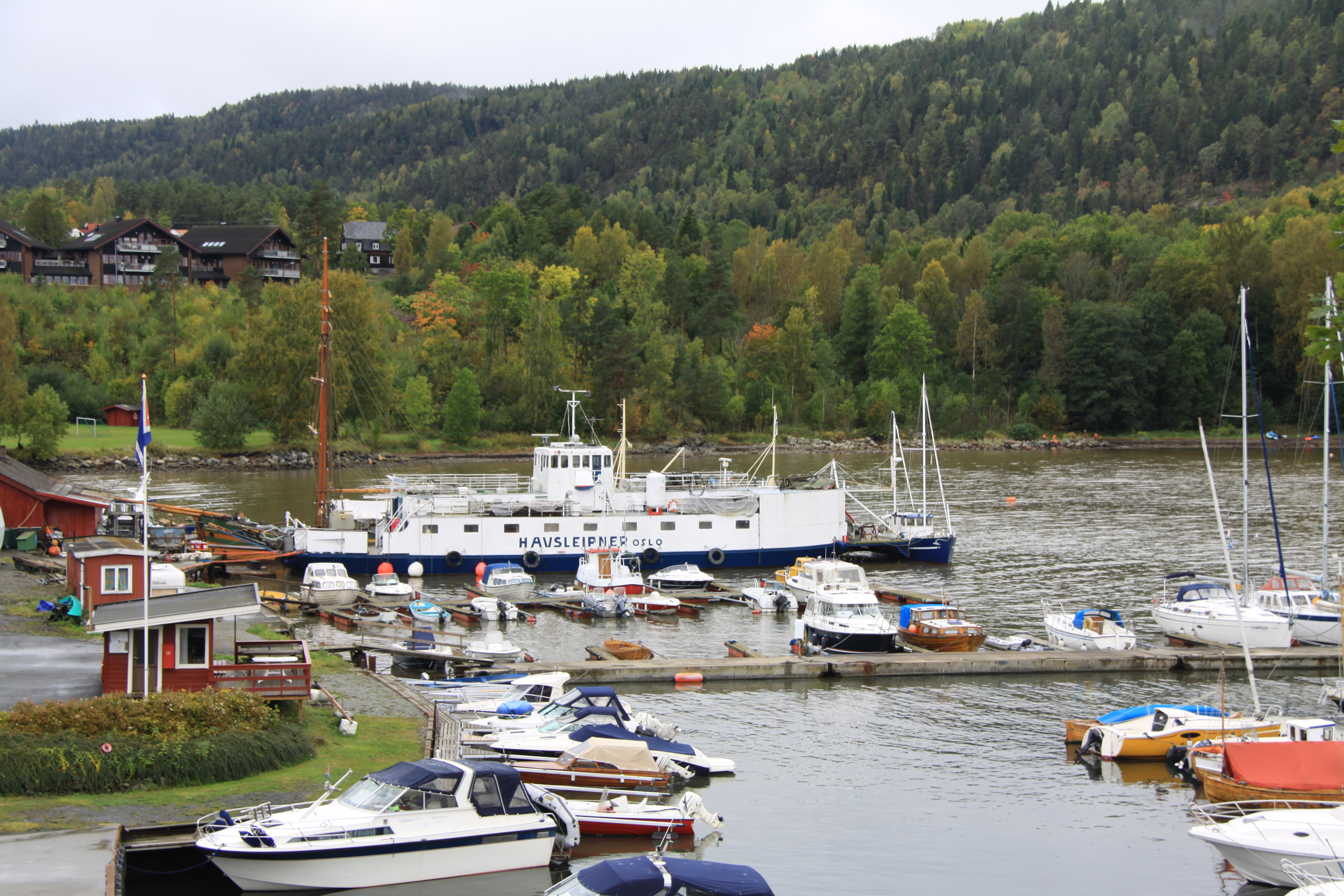
Nærsnes harbour

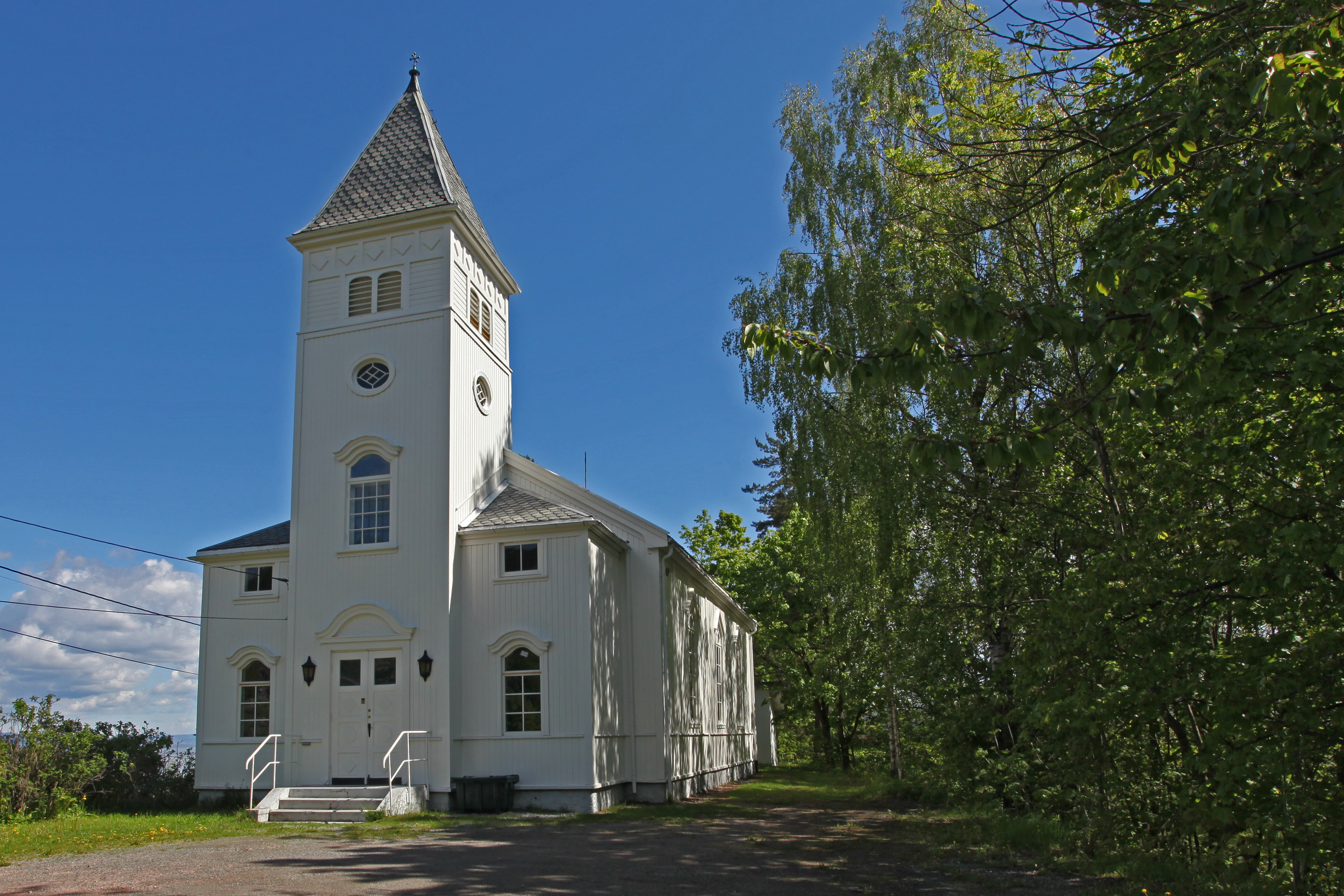
Nærsnes Church

Nærsnes is a village in Røyken in Asker municipality in Akershus, Norway. It is located along the Oslofjord between Båtstø and Slemmestad. As of 2003, it is considered a part of the Greater Oslo area.

At the end of the 19th century, ice blocks from Nærsnes were exported to Europe, through Drammen. Around 100 sailing ships handled the transportation from Drammen.

Nærsnes Church (Nærnes kirke) was consecrated as the chapel in 1900. During 1924–1925, it was extensively rebuild after plans by architect Alfred Christian Dahl (1857- 1940) .The organ in the church was built by Eriksen and Svendsen in 1860. The bell was cast by Olsen Nauen Kløstøperi in 1925.
