= Bødalen =

Bødalen may refer to:

== Places ==
- Bødalen, Asker, a village in Asker Municipality in Akershus county, Norway
- Bødalen, Innlandet, a village in Gausdal Municipality in Innlandet county, Norway
- Bødalen, Vestland, a village and valley in Stryn Municipality in Vestland county, Norway
