= Martin Ugander =

Swedish physician researcher

- Born: Martin Ugander; 1975 (age 51); Stockholm, Sweden
- Education: Lund University
- Scientific career
- Fields: Cardiology; Clinical physiology Medicine
- Institutions: Lund University; National Institutes of Health; Karolinska Institutet; University of Sydney
- Thesis: Dysfunctional but viable myocardium – ischemic heart disease assessed by magnetic resonance imaging and single photon emission computed tomography (2006)

Martin Ugander (born 1975) is a Swedish medical doctor and professor of Cardiac imaging at the University of Sydney, Australia, best known for his work on cardiac magnetic resonance imaging (MRI).

== Early life and education ==
Born in Sweden, he grew up in Woodcliff Lake, New Jersey, US, where he graduated from Pascack Hills High School in Montvale, NJ, USA. He undertook one year of undergraduate studies at McGill University, Montreal, Canada, before enrolling in Lund University, Sweden, graduating with an MD in 2001 and PhD in 2006 titled: "Dysfunctional but viable myocardium – ischemic heart disease assessed by magnetic resonance imaging and single photon emission computed tomography".

== Career ==
During medical school at Lund University he served as President of the Medical Students' Association 1996–1997. While at Lund University he was part of the team that determined aspects of cardiac mechanics including the role of the motion of the atrioventricular (AV) plane in cardiac pumping, also referred to as mitral annular plane systolic excursion (MAPSE).

From 2009 to 2011, he was as a Post-doctoral Research Fellow in Cardiovascular MRI and CT at the National Institutes of Health (NIH) in Bethesda, Maryland, USA. During this time he developed the use of myocardial T1 mapping by MRI to assess myocardial edema and myocardial extracellular volume fraction (ECV).

Between 2011 and 2019, he underwent clinical training in the physician specialty Clinical Physiology at Karolinska University Hospital in Stockholm, Sweden, where he also founded and led the Karolinska Cardiovascular Magnetic Resonance Group at the Karolinska Institutet. While at Karolinska, his team described the contribution of hydraulic forces to left ventricular diastolic filling, and developed Advanced ECG analysis methods for diagnosing heart disease.

This also included development of smartwatch 12-lead ECG.

Since 2019, He is a professor of Cardiac imaging and since 2020 Director of Clinical Imaging at the University of Sydney, leads the University of Sydney Cardiovascular Magnetic Resonance Research Group, and is founding convenor or the Sydney Clinical Imaging Network.

Since 2019, he is a fellow of the Cardiac Society of Australia and New Zealand (FCSANZ).

== Personal life ==
Ugander is married to Australian academic cardiologist Rebecca Kozor, and is the older brother of Swedish-American academic applied mathematician Johan Ugander.
