= Batsto =

Batsto may refer to:

- Batsto River, a tributary of the Mullica River in southern New Jersey
- Batsto Village, New Jersey, a New Jersey state historic site
- Båtstø, a village in Buskerud, Norway
