= Eberhart Jensen =

Norwegian astrophysicist

Eberhart Jensen (22 July 1922 – 16 January 2003) was a Norwegian astrophysicist.

He was born in Røyken as a son of farmer Edvard Jensen (1850–1930) and Berthe Marie Kristiansen (1883–1961). He finished his secondary education in 1942 and graduated from the University of Oslo with the cand.real. degree in 1949. During the occupation of Norway, after the 1943 University of Oslo fire, he was arrested together with a thousand students and sent to Stavern. In December he was shipped on to Sennheim, later Buchenwald. He survived until the camp was liberated. In 1948 he married Liv Linnestad.

He took his Ph.D. at the University of Chicago in 1953, and was hired as lecturer at the University of Oslo in 1959 and docent in 1961. His fields were mainly solar physics and plasma physics. From 1965 to 1992 he served as professor, and he also edited the official Norwegian almanac from 1966 to 1993. He was admitted into the Norwegian Academy of Science and Letters in 1965.

He resided in Østerås. He died in January 2003, aged 80.
