= Ioannidis =

Ioannidis or Ioannides (Greek: Ιωαννίδης) is a Greek surname. The female version of the name is Ioannidou or Ioannides. Ioannidis or Ioannides is a patronymic surname which literally means "the son of Ioannis (Yiannis)", thus making it equivalent to English Johnson. Notable people with surname Ioannidis or Ioannides include:

== Men ==
- Alkinoos Ioannidis (born 1969), Cypriot composer and singer
- Andreas Ioannides (footballer) (born 1975), Cypriot football player
- Dimitrios Ioannides (1923–2010), military officer involved in the Greek military junta of 1967–1974
- Evgenios Ioannidis (born 2001), Greek chess player
- Fotis Ioannidis (born 2000), Greek footballer
- Georgios Ioannidis (born 1988), Greek footballer
- Giannis Ioannidis (1945–2023), former basketball coach and politician
- John Ioannidis (born 1965), medical researcher
- Matt Ioannidis (born 1994), American football player
- Nikolaos Ioannidis (born 1994), Greek footballer
- Paul Ioannidis (1924–2021), pilot and resistance fighter
- Perikles Ioannidis (1881–1965), admiral and second husband of Princess Maria Georgievna of Greece and Denmark
- Philaret Ioannides (1886 - 1961) Bishop of Chicago, IL 1923 - 1930
- Yannis Ioannidis (born 1959), computer scientist
- Vassilis Ioannidis (born 1967), Greek footballer

== Women ==
- Mairi Ioannidou (born 1952), Greek Olympic swimmer
- Noni Ioannidou (born 1958), Greek actress and model
- Sarah Ioannides (born 1972), music director and conductor of the El Paso Symphony Orchestra
- Yiota Ioannidou (born 1971), Cypriot sculptor
