= Björn Jonson =

- Born: April 12, 1940 (age 86)
- Citizenship: Swedish
- Known for: Developer of the modern servo ventilator
- Scientific career
- Fields: Clinical physiology

Björn Jonson (born 12 April 1940) is a Swedish professor emeritus in clinical physiology at Lund University in Sweden. He developed the modern servo ventilator.

In 1964, Jonson returned from Atlanta, USA, as a 24-year-old student, following a 3-month training in the field of respiratory physiology by professor Arend Bouhuys. Jonson was employed by Håkan Westling's newly established Department of Clinical Physiology in Lund. He was given responsibility for the department's lung physiology part and soon found that the equipment of the time had major flaws. In collaboration with Sven Ingelstedt, he began to think about how devices that should support patients' breathing should actually work. He was given freedom to design a breathing machine, and in collaboration with Sven-Gunnar Olsson, an engineer at Elema-Schönander AB, a first model of what later became the very successful Servo Ventilator was created. In collaboration with the anesthesiologist Lars Nordström, the Servo Ventilator was introduced internationally. The respirator not only supported the patient's breathing according to their needs, but also provided measurement values that could be used to diagnose and monitor the patient's breathing problems, thus contributing to the development of specialized intensive care units.
