= Båtstø =

Village in Buskerud, Norway

Coordinates: 59°43′N 10°31′E

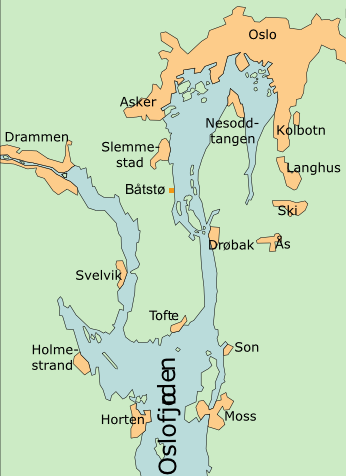
Båtstø on Oslofjord

Båtstø is a small village in Asker municipality in Akerhus county. The village is situated along the Oslofjord between Åros and Nærsnes in Røyken. The distance to Drammen is about 24 km and to Oslo about 38 km.

The population of Båtstø was 228 as of January 2005.
