= Jonas Jansen =

Norwegian archivist

Jens Jonas Schroeter Jansen (19 September 1900 – 26 October 1975) was a Norwegian archivist.

He was born in Bærum as a son of vicar Jens Jonas Elstrand Jansen (1844–1912) and Jenny Therese Schroeter (1863–1942), and brother of Einar Jansen. In 1937 he married Hjørdis Sofie Berg.

He finished his secondary education in 1918 and graduated from the Royal Frederick University with the cand.philol. degree in 1927 with a master's thesis on the Treaty of Björkö.

He worked in the National Archives of Norway from 1936 to 1956, and also worked as a consultant in the Ministry of Foreign Affairs from 1949 to 1952. He was then the manager of Norsk Historisk Kjeldeskrift-Institutt from 1953 to 1970. He is also known as a co-editor of the biographical dictionary Norsk Biografisk Leksikon from 1954. He chaired the union Arkivarforeningen from 1938 to 1947 and was a board member of Kjeldeskriftfondet from 1940 to 1945 and of the Norwegian Genealogical Society from 1949.

In private relations, he used the very conservative pre-1907 orthography. He died in 1975.
