= Jens Fredrik Schroeter =

Norwegian astronomer (1857–1927)

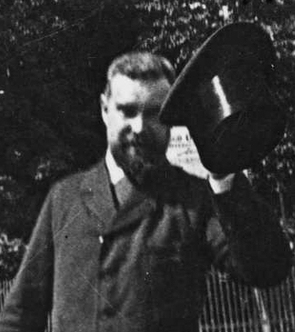
- Schroeter circa 1895
- Born: 21 May 1857; Drammen
- Died: 27 April 1927 (aged 69); Oslo
- Citizenship: Norwegian
- Scientific career
- Fields: astrometry astrophysics
- Institutions: University of Oslo

Jens Fredrik Wilhelm Schroeter (21 May 1857 – 27 April 1927) was a Norwegian astronomer.

He was born in Drammen as a son of sea captain Fredrik Julius Bech Schroeter and his wife Julie Schroeter. His paternal family had migrated into Norway from Langeland, Denmark in 1787. Through his sister Jenny, he was a brother-in-law of priest Jens Jonas Jansen and an uncle of historian, genealogist and archivist Einar Jansen.

He finished his secondary education in 1872, and graduated with the cand.real. degree in 1882. His interest for astronomy stemmed from childhood, when his father had taught him the Zodiac, the planets and how to use the sextant. He worked at the observatory in Bossekop from 1882 to 1884, and as an assistant at the Norwegian Meteorological Institute from 1884 to 1888. From 1888 to 1890 he held a fellowship and was an observator abroad, but in 1891 he returned to Norway as an observator at the Observatory of the Royal Frederick University in 1891. The director of the observatory since 1890 was professor Hans Geelmuyden, and when Geelmuyden retired as a professor in 1919, he was replaced by Schroeter. Schroeter also edited the official Norwegian almanac, succeeding Geelmuyden here as well.

He was the Norwegian editor of the journal Nordisk astronomisk Tidsskrift, and was a member of the Norwegian Academy of Science and Letters. His academic publications were mainly in the German language. Outside of the strictly academic field, he also contributed to the encyclopedia Salomonsens Konversationsleksikon, as well as the almanac. He died in 1927 in Oslo.
