= Querelle Jansen =

Dutch model (born 1985)

- Born: October 14, 1985 (age 40); Rotterdam, the Netherlands
- Modeling information
- Height: 1.81 m (5 ft 11 in)
- Hair color: Blonde (Natural) Black (Dyed)
- Eye color: Blue-green

Querelle Jansen (born October 14, 1985, in Rotterdam, the Netherlands) is a Dutch model. Her real name is Lisette Jansen; Querelle is her professional name, chosen by an agent who had been looking for a model to name after her favourite literary character, Jean Genet's Georges Querelle.

Querelle's aura landed her a series of editorials with several mainstream publications, including Vogue Italia and Paris, Numéro, i-D, Mixt(e), and V magazine. Marc Jacobs, Burberry, Costume National, H&M, Hugo Boss, Prada, and Miu Miu all chose her for their advertisement campaigns. The quirky personal style she presented at castings inspired Marc Jacobs' aesthetic for the spring 2005 Louis Vuitton prêt-à-porter collection .

Her runway appearances include Valentino, Versace, Marc Jacobs, Louis Vuitton, Dolce & Gabbana, Chloé, Prada, Rochas, and Burberry. Her image has graced the covers of Zoo magazine (Germany) and Vogue (Russia).

Jansen's friends include Tasha Tilberg, Anouck Lepere, and Marta Bērzkalna.
