= Bødalen, Asker =

Village in Asker municipality, Norway

Coordinates: 59°46′N 010°28′E

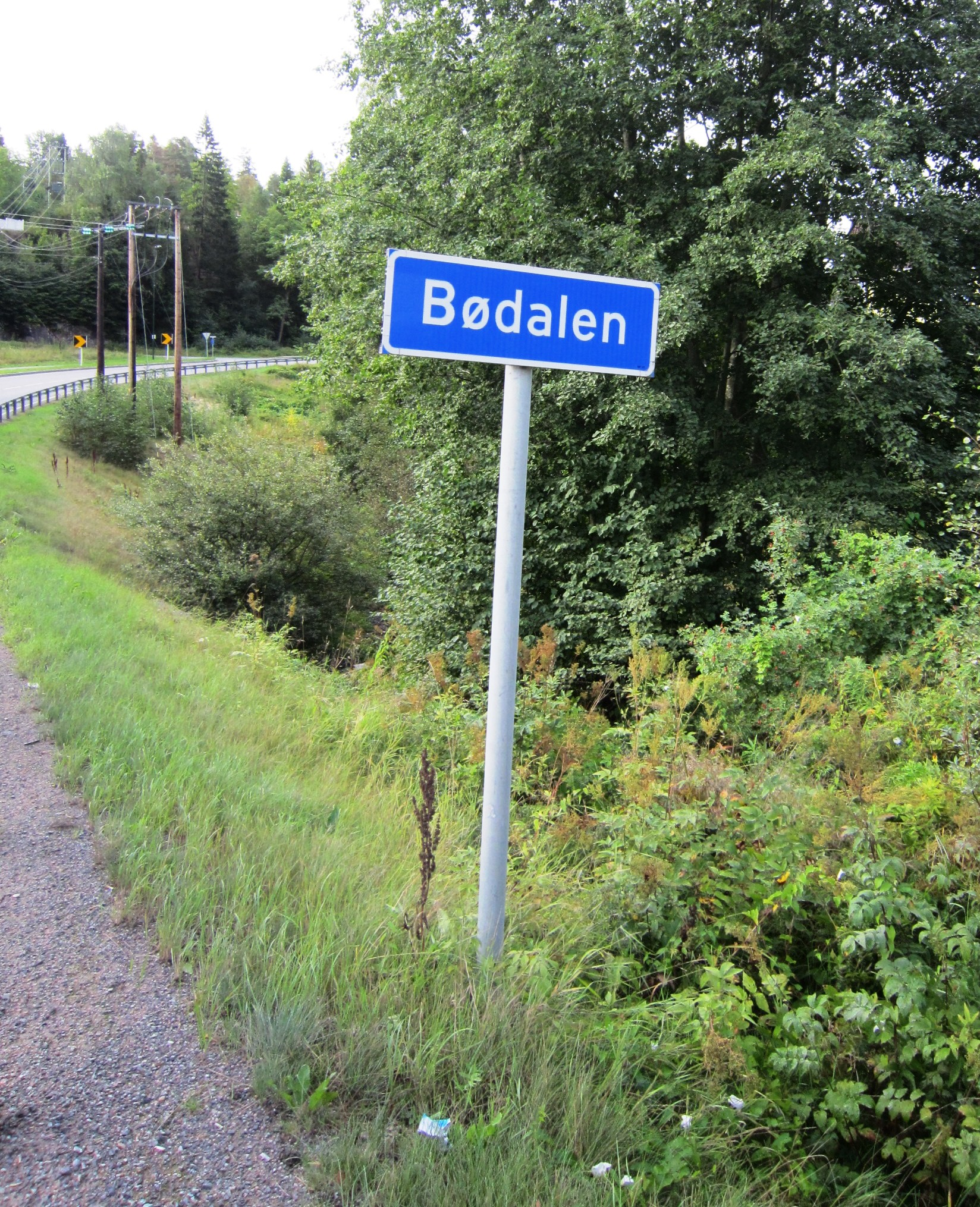
Bødalen sign post on fylkesvei 165

Bødalen is a village in Røyken in Asker municipality of Akershus, Norway.

Bødalen is situated adjacent to Slemmestad. It is located about 35 km south of Oslo and 25 kilometers east of Drammen. For statistical purposes, it is regarded as a part of the Oslo metropolitan urban area. North of Bødalen and its vicinities is a continuous residential area that continues throughout Asker and Bærum to Oslo.

Bødalen forms part of the Oslo Geological Region (Oslofeltet). This area is located in the escarpment between bedrock to the south and sedimentary rocks in the north. It forms part of the geological area Oslo Graben.
