= Jonson =

Jonson is a surname, a patronymic of Jon. It has also been used rarely as a given name.

People with this surname include:

- Ben Jonson (1572–1637), English Renaissance dramatist, poet and actor
- Björn Jonson (born 1940), Swedish professor
- Fredric Jonson (born 1987), Swedish professional football player
- Gail Jonson (born 1965), New Zealand medley and butterfly swimmer
- Graeme Jonson (born 1940), Australian rules footballer
- Gustav Jonson (1880–1942), Estonian military soldier
- Guy Jonson (1913–2009), English pianist and teacher
- Halvar Jonson (1941–2016), Canadian politician
- Mattias Jonson (born 1974), Swedish professional football player
- Pål Jonson, (born 1972), Swedish politician
- Peter Jonson, English shoemaker
- Raymond Jonson (1891–1982), American painter

People with the given name include:

- Jonson Clarke-Harris (born 1994), British soccer player
- Jonson Clifton (born 1978), Australian rules football player

== See also ==
- Jonson Gallery, University of New Mexico, Albuquerque, New Mexico, USA
- Johnson (disambiguation)
