= Catherine Jansen =

American photographer

- Born: December 14, 1950 (age 75); New York City, New York, U.S.
- Education: Cranbrook Academy of Art and Tyler School of Art and Architecture
- Known for: Photography

Catherine Jansen is a photographer who has been active since the late 1960s. She is known for her unique style that merges technology with traditional photography.

== Work ==
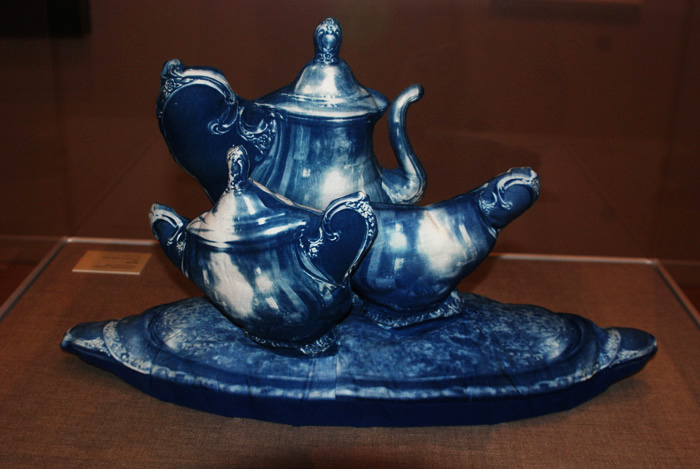
Soft Silver Tea Set

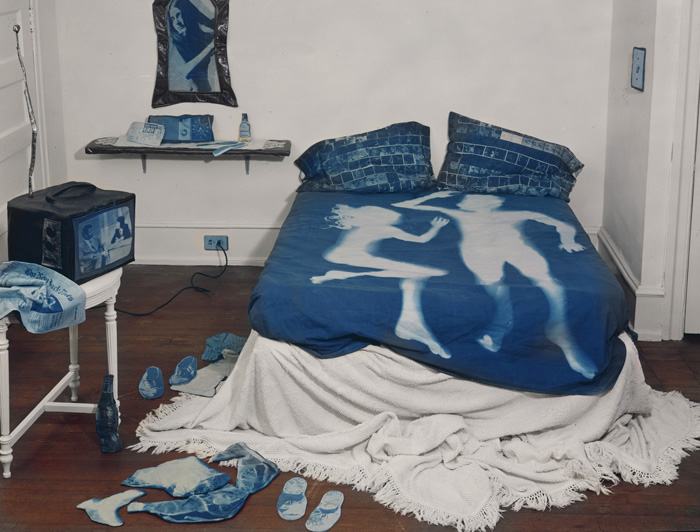
The Blue Room

=== Soft sculpture ===
==== Cyanotype ====
In 1969 Jansen created the Soft Tea Set, a scaled to life, photographic, three-dimensional object using a formula of potassium ferrocyanide and citric acid, which she developed specifically for cloth material. Stitching the imaged fabric together and stuffing it, she was the first to use this photographic process in a sculptural format.

Jansen’s innovations with this blue print formula culminated in the first use of photography to create a scaled to life room environment using cyanotype on cloth. The Blue Room is part of the permanent collection at the Michener Museum of Art in Doylestown, Pennsylvania.

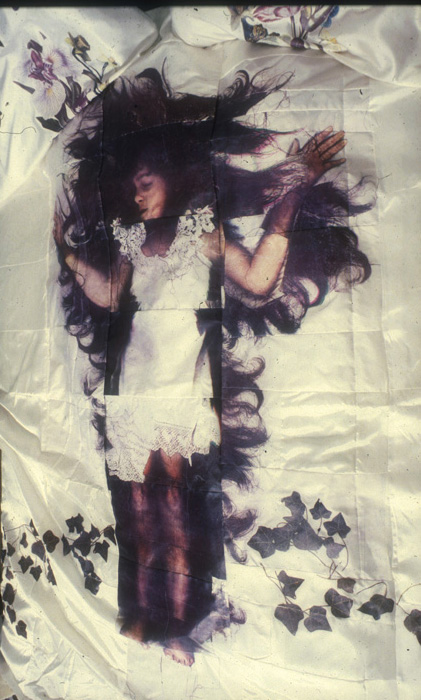
Erika, life-size portrait on cloth

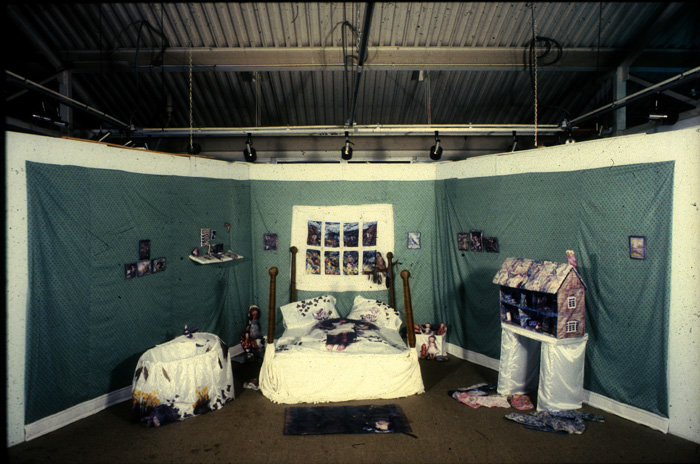
Children's Room, one of five rooms from Soft House Project

==== Color copier ====
Jansen was the first artist to extensively explore the potential of the electronic color copier process using electronically generated images that preceded the digital camera and computer technology. Her first scaled to life room environment using this process was The Bathroom with Satin Sink and Taffeta Toilet. This installation is part of the permanent collection at the Honolulu Museum of Art Museum in Hawaii.

This process using the color copier, the precursor to the digital age, evolved into the Soft House Project, a five-room scaled to life house environment, utilizing thousands of photographic images. While developing this protocol Jansen developed a method for photographing the figure full scale on cloth, as well as rendering three-dimensional objects on cloth. The life size portrait on cloth, Erika, is in the permanent collection at the Center for Creative Photography in Tucson, Arizona.

Between 1971-1976 Jansen was awarded a National Endowment for the Arts grant and two Pennsylvania Council on the Arts grants to complete a scaled to life five room house using color copier technology.

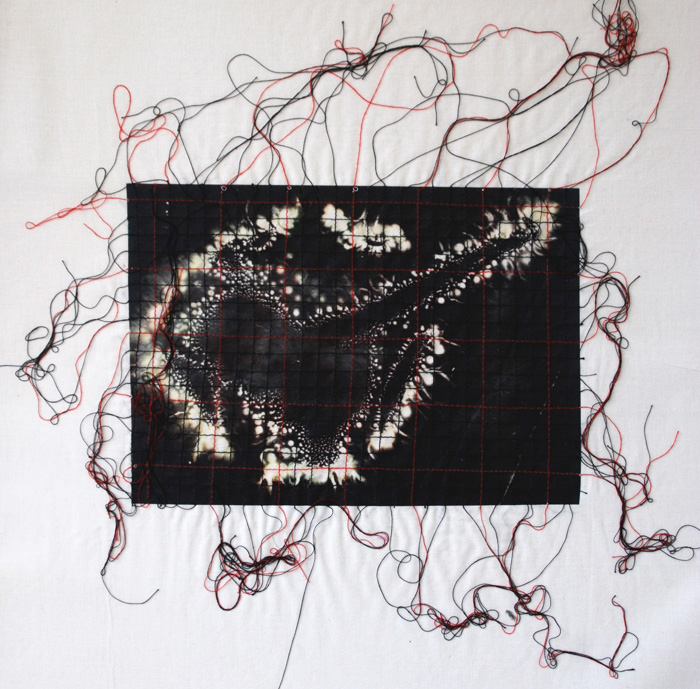
One of Jansen's Kirlian photographs

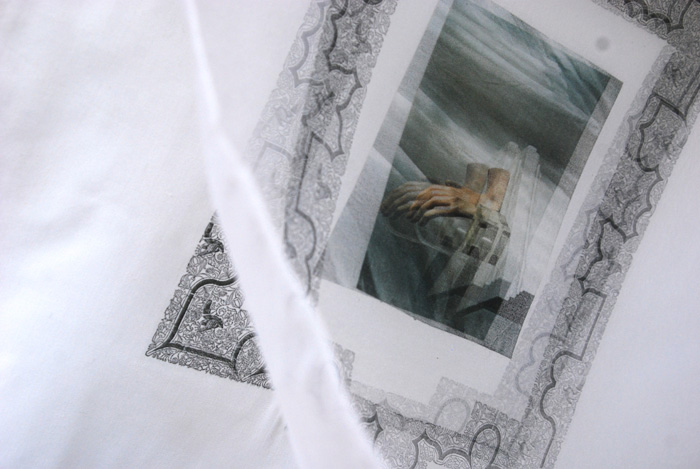
An example of Jansen's process to make multiple layered images appear as one three-dimensional photograph

=== Other photographic processes ===
In 1977 Jansen built a Kirlian photographic gold screen unit and spent several years exploring, generating, and utilizing Kirlian photography on cloth as a fine art expression.

In 1985, by photographing the same object from multiple vantage points and stitching layers of cloth together, she created a protocol for making a photographic image appear three-dimensional.

Throughout the 1990s Jansen was involved with the ongoing Thirsty River project, in which she utilized 77 yards of fabric strategically laid it out in the landscape to reflect the light of the rising sun. In the light of the sun the fabric takes on a new form and connects with the landscape. The River has been taken in a suitcase to dozens of countries on five continents.

In 1995 Jansen, with a team of students, created 75 costumes for the Copernicus Project. These innovative cloth costumes, also considered wearable sculpture, used photographic imagery to express content as well provide decorative elements They were exhibited at the Philadelphia Museum of Art and are part of the permanent collection at the Michener Museum of Art.

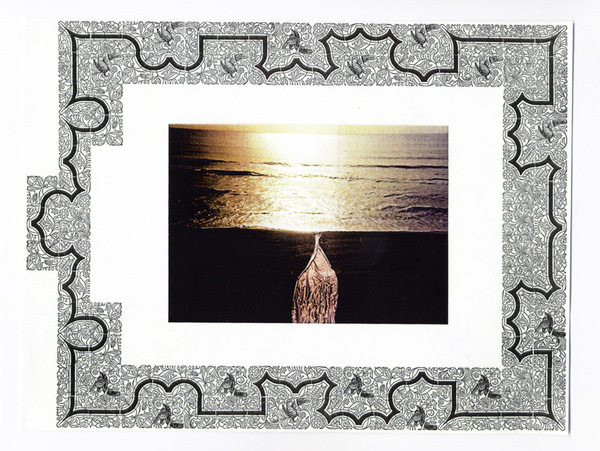
The Thirsty River at one of its many destinations

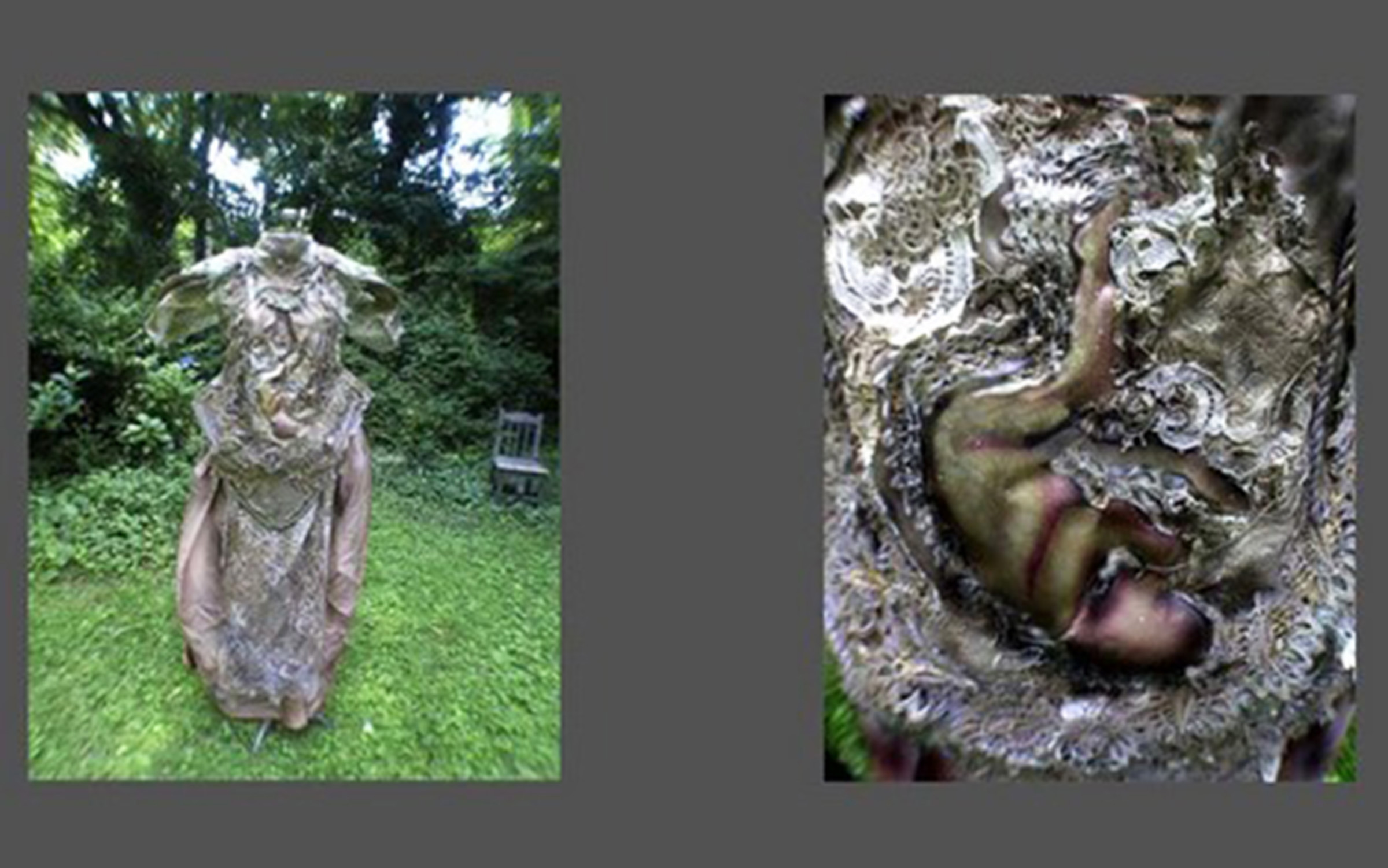
One of the costumes from the Copernicus Project

=== Digital ===
From the late 1990s to today, Jansen has been working with a digital camera and Adobe Photoshop to create a visual vocabulary that builds photographs into a long format that can express psychological and emotional time and space within the image. This work has coincided with 15 trips to India, and is an ongoing project called The Nada Series.

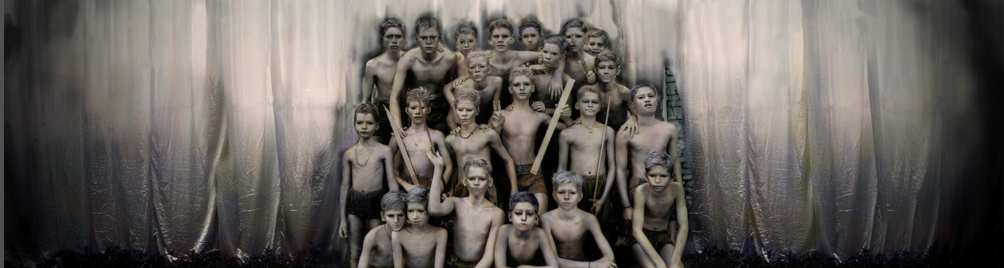

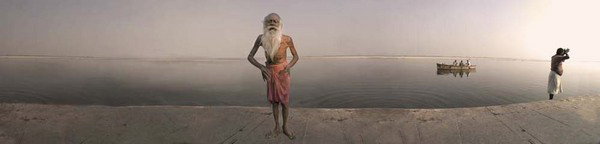
Photographs from The Nada Series

Jansen presently lives in Wyncote, Pennsylvania and spends three and a half months out of every year in India. While there, she spends her time volunteering at Little Stars School for street children and orphans, as well as working on her Nada Series.

== Education ==
- 1970 - BFA Cranbrook Academy Of Art, Bloomsfield Hills, MI
- 1972 - Certificate, Academia di Belli Arti, Rome, Italy
- 1976 - MFA, Tyler School of Art, Temple University, Philadelphia, PA

== Recognition ==
=== Grants and awards ===
- 2003 - Professor Emeritus
- 1999 - Cultural Incentive Grant
- 1988 - Individual Artists Grant, Pennsylvania Council of the Arts
- 1983 - Individual Artists Grant, National Endowment of the Arts
- 1982 - Cultural Incentive Grant
- 1981 - Individual Artist Grant, Pennsylvania Council of the Arts

=== Selected exhibitions ===
==== Individual ====
- 2005 - Owen Patrick Gallery, Philadelphia, PA
- 1999 - Fine Arts Museum, Melbourne, FL
- 1998 - Owen Patrick Gallery, Philadelphia, PA
- 1997 - Villanova University, Philadelphia, PA
- 1995 - Michner Museum of Art, Doyelstown, PA
- 1991 - The Center for Creative Photography, Tucson, AZ
- 1990 - Spaces Gallery, Cleveland, OH
- 1989 - Photographic Resource Center, Boston, MA
- 1989 - University of Virginia, Charlottesville, NC

==== Group ====
- 2009 -10 Common Ground: Eight Philadelphia Photographers in the 1960s and 1970s, Philadelphia Museum of Art, Philadelphia, PA
- 2009 -10 An Evolving Legacy, Twenty Years of Collecting, Michener ArtMuseum, Doylestown, PA
- 2008 - Alternative Photography, Moore College of Art, Philadelphia, PA
- 2006 - Hololulu Museum of Art, Honolulu, HI
- 2004 - Alternative Photographic Processes, Boston, MA
- 2001 - Imaging the Inner Eye, Allens Lane Art Center, Philadelphia, PA
- 2000 - Imaging the Inner Eye, Allens Lane Art Center, Philadelphia, PA
- 1998 - Woodmere Art Museum, Germantown, PA
- 1998 - Photographic Alternatives, Hong Kong Art Center, Hong Kong
- 1997 - Conspicuous Display, Rutgers University, Rutgers, NJ
- 1996 - Bernice Steinbeckk Gallery, New York, NY

=== Collections ===
- Philadelphia Museum of Art
- Michener Museum of Art, Doyelstown, PA
- High Museum of Art, Honolulu, HI
- Photographic Resource Center, Tucson, AZ
- Michael Kohler Art Institute, Sheboygan, WI

== Sources ==
- Alternative Photographic Processes. Dobbs Ferry, NY: Morgan and Morgan, Inc., 1978.
- Bagnell, Ann. The Tyler Show: Working Women Artists from Tyler School of Art. Philadelphia, PA: Temple University, 1974.
- Battaglia, Lee. "Art as Photography as Art." Horizons USA Nov. 1985: 55.
- Bevlin, Marjorie E. Design Through Discovery. 4th ed. New York: CBS College, 1984: 224.
- "Blue Room." Craft Horizons Apr. 1973: 28.
- Brisco, Paula, ed. An Evolving Legacy: Twenty Years of Collecting, at the James A. Michener Art Museum. Doylestown: Brilliant Graphics, 2009.
- "Catherine Jansen." Hard Choices Just Rewards Summer 1989: 10.
- "Catherine Jansen." Progresso Fotografico Mar. 1980: 45-46.
- Coleman, A.D. "Hybridization: A Photographic Tradition." Photo Fusion Jan. 1980: 4.
- Constantine, Mildred, and Laurel Reuter. Whole Cloth. New York City, NY: The Monaccelli Press, Inc, 1997: 7-22, 174.
- Davies, Thomas L., comp. Lenseless Photography. Philadelphia: The Franklin Institute Science Museum, 1982.
- Edelman, Sharon, ed. Artpark: The Program in Visual Arts. Lewiston: Artpark, 1976: 78-79.
- Fabbri, Anne R., ed. An Inside Place: Interior Spaces of the Mind and Eye. Oceanville: The Noyes Museum, 1985.
- Frontiers of Photography. New York: Time-Life Books, 1972: 92-93.
- Gagnon, John H., and Cathy S. Greenblat. Life Designs: Individuals, Marriages, and Families. Glenview: Scott, Foresman and Company, 1978.
- Golden Years: Tyler's 50th Anniversary, A Celebration of Alumni Achievement. Philadelphia: Tyler School of Art Temple University, 1985: 93.
- Gordon, Beverly. "Soft Sculpture: Old Forms, New Meanings." Fiber Arts Nov.-Dec. 1983: 61.
- "Grab Shots." Dark Room Sep. - Oct. 1983: 6.
- Holmes, Greg, and Martin Wolin Jr., eds. Portfolio 1978: 23.
- Howell-Koehler, Nancy. The Creative Camera. Worcester: Davis Publications, Inc, 1989: 149.
- James, Christopher. The Book of Alternative Photographic Processes. New York City, NY: Delmar Cengage Learning, 2009: 7-22, 174.
- James, Christopher. The Book of Alternative Photographic Processes. New York City, NY: Thomson Learning, Inc., 2002: 130, 328.
- Jansen, Catherine. "Catherine Jansen." Philadelphia Arts Exchange Summer 1965: 20.
- Kolter, Jane B. Forget Me Not: A Gallery of Friendship and Album Quilts. Pittstown: The Main Street, 1985.
- Maljan, Cecilia, ed. Photo Paper 1988: 10.
- Markowski, Gene. The Art of Photography Image and Illusion. Englewood Cliffs, N.J: Prentice-Hall, 1984: 163.
- Meline, Caroline. "Catherine's Room." Philadelphia Nov. 1981: 88-89.
- Mott, Jacolyn. Searching Out the Best . Philadelphia, PA: Pennsylvania Academy of the Fine Arts, 1988.
- Parker, Fred R. Contemporary Photography as Phantasy: A Visualization of a Theory of Life that Provides a Familiarity with Mystery. Santa Barbara: Santa Barbara Museum of Art, 1982: 4.
- The Port of History Museum. Printed By Women: A National Exhibition of Photographs and Prints. Philadelphia: The Print Club, 1983: 43.
- Radloff, Alfred G. "Catherine Jansen." IMAGES 18 Nov. 1983: 12.
- "Recent Color." THE ARCHIVE Dec. 1981: 26.
- Rice, Shelley. Past and Present. Philadelphia, PA: Bucks Community College, 1983: 19-20.
- Rost, John L. The Alternative Image II: Photography on Nonconventional Supporters. Sheboygan, Wisconsin: Sheboygan Arts Foundation, Inc., 1984: 70.
- Ryesky, Helene. "Catherine Jansen." Photo Review Winter 2000: 21-22.
- Ryesky, Helene. "Fabric of Photography." Art Matters Spring 1999: 26-28.
- Snyder, Norman, ed. The Photography Catalog. New York: Harper & Row, 1976: 189.
- Sorlien, Sandy. "Women's Work: Catherine Jansen." Photo Review Winter 1994: 14-15.
- Spandorfer, Merle. Making Art Safely: Alternative Methods and Materials in Drawing, Painting, Printmaking, Graphic Design, and Photography. New York City, NY: Van Nostran Reinhold, 1993: 175.
- Steinbaum, Bernice. The Definitive Contemporary American Quilt. New York: Bernice Steinbaum Gallery, 1990: 37.
- "Surrealismo." Progresso Fotografico Mar. 1980: 46-47.
- Torchia, Richard, comp. "Catherine Jansen." Hard Choices, Just Rewards 1987: 23.
- Turner, Evan H. . Philadelphia: Three Centuries Of American Art. Philadelphia, PA: Philadelphia Museum of Art, 1976.
- Upton, Barbara, and John Upton. Photography. Boston: Little Brown and Company,1970.
- Wade, Kent E. Alternative Photographic Processes. Dobbs Ferry, NY: Morgan and Morgan, Inc., 1978: 60.
- Williams, Arthur. The Sculpture Reference Illustrated. Gulfport, MS: Sculpture Books Publishing, 2005: 145.
