= Giannopoulos =

Giannopoulos, Yannopoulos, Yiannopoulos, Gianopoulos or Gianopulos, variously transliterated from the Greek: Γιαννόπουλος, is a Greek family name, which means "son of John". The female version of the name is Giannopoulou/Yiannopoulou (Γιαννοπούλου). Notable people with this name include:

== Giannopoulos ==
- Charis Giannopoulos (born 1989), Greek basketball player
- Kyriakos Giannopoulos (born 1959), Greek water polo player
- Nick Giannopoulos (born 1963), Greek Australian stand-up comedian and actor
- Panagiotis Giannopoulos (born 1972), Greek footballer
- Pericles Giannopoulos (1870–1869), Greek poet
- Stavros Giannopoulos (born 1961), Greek water polo player
- Tasos Giannopoulos (1931–1977), Greek movie actor
- Tout Giannopoulos (born 1964), name used by Estonian basketball player Tiit Sokk, while playing in Greece

== Gianopoulos ==
- Panio Gianopoulos (born 1975), Greek American writer and editor

== Gianopulos ==
- Jim Gianopulos (born 1951), Greek American businessman, CEO of Fox Entertainment Group
- Mimi Gianopulos (born 1989), Greek American film actress, daughter of Jim Gianopulos

== Giannopoulou ==
- Eleni Konsolaki-Giannopoulou, Greek archeologist
- Ifigeneia Giannopoulou (1964–2004), Greek songwriter and author

== Yannopoulos ==
- Dino Yannopoulos (1919–2003), Greek stage director
- Evangelos Yannopoulos (1918–2003), Greek lawyer and socialist politician

== Yiannopoulos ==
- A. N. Yiannopoulos (1928–2017), Greek-born American law professor
- Christos Yiannopoulos (born 1957), Greek-born German screenwriter and novelist
- Milo Yiannopoulos (born Milo Hanrahan 1984), British journalist and commentator
