= Eric Jansen =

German footballer

Personal information
- Date of birth: 5 May 2000 (age 26)
- Place of birth: Germany
- Height: 1.89 m (6 ft 2 in)
- Position: Centre back

Youth career
- –2014: SV Perouse
- 2015–2019: Karlsruher SC

Senior career*
| Years | Team | Apps | (Gls) |
| 2018 | Karlsruher SC II | 1 | (0) |
| 2018–2019 | Karlsruher SC | 1 | (0) |
| 2019–2020 | Astoria Walldorf | 5 | (0) |
| 2019–2022 | Astoria Walldorf II | 33 | (1) |

International career
| 2016 | Germany U17 | 1 | (0) |
| 2017–2018 | Germany U18 | 3 | (0) |
| 2018–2019 | Germany U19 | 3 | (0) |
- * Club domestic league appearances and goals as of 09:39, 15 December 2024 (UTC)

Eric Jansen (born 5 May 2000) is a German footballer who plays as a centre back. He also holds Brazilian citizenship.
