= Marta Bērzkalna =

Latvian fashion model

- Born: 1985 (age 40–41); Riga, Latvian SSR, Soviet Union
- Modeling information
- Height: 5 ft 10 in (1.78 m)
- Hair color: Brown
- Eye color: Blue

Marta Bērzkalna (born 1985) is a Latvian fashion model. She has modeled for Anna Sui, Balenciaga, Chanel, Chloé, Christian Dior, Dolce & Gabbana, Donna Karan, Dries van Noten, Emilio Pucci, Givenchy, Hermès, Lanvin, Louis Vuitton, Salvatore Ferragamo, Versace, John Galliano, and others.
