= Robert Marcelonis =

American musician

- Birth name: Robert Marcelonis
- Born: June 2, 1953
- Died: March 30, 1995 (aged 41)
- Occupation: Musician

Robert Marcelonis (June 2, 1953 – March 30, 1995) was an American musician and artist based in Philadelphia.

== Biography ==
Robert Marcelonis had five sisters (Joan, Mary, Rosalie, Regina and Margaret) and two brothers (Frank and Joseph).

Marcelonis studied at Temple University and received a degree in music composition. He composed commemorative music for the canonization of John Neumann in 1977.

Marcelonis worked as a computer consultant until 1992, when he was diagnosed with AIDS. He quit work and began focussing on his musical career: he staged his early musical Fables, based on Aesop's Fables, at a community theatre in Ridley Park, Pennsylvania. He then wrote the musical Copernicus over a four month period and staged it at the Annenberg Center for the Performing Arts to raise money for AIDS organizations.

Marcelonis died at his Germantown home on March 30, 1995.
