= Jens Jonas Jansen =

Norwegian priest, teacher and columnist (1844–1912)

Jens Jonas Elstrand Jansen (8 March 1844 – 1 August 1912) was a Norwegian priest, teacher, and columnist.

== Biography ==
He was born in Hobøl Municipality as a son of priest David Middelthon Jansen and his wife Eleonore Cathrine Elstrand. In May 1883 he married twenty-year-old Jenny Therese Schroeter from Drammen, a sister of professor Jens Fredrik Schroeter. Their son Einar Jansen became a notable historian, genealogist and archivist.

He became a student at Nissens Latin- og Realskole, finished his secondary education in 1861 and graduated with the cand.theol. degree in 1869. He first worked as a teacher, at the same time editing the magazines Børnenes Blad and Hjemmet, but was hired as a curate in Skjeberg Municipality in 1873. He became vicar in Varteig Municipality in 1883 and in Røyken Municipality in 1890, and retired due to bad health in January 1898.

Bishop Eivind Berggrav described his effort for the Church of Norway, on which he had a "qualitative influence", as "unusual". He was especially known for his sermons, as well as the lectures Kristendom og Videnskab (1882) and Hvor meget tror vi? (1887), which were both printed in 1903. Several of his sermons were later printed, as well as the memoirs Oplevet og tænkt (1909). He was also a columnist and literary critic in Morgenbladet.

His aim was to induce a personal and rational Lutheran faith. He saw the influence of Orthodox theologian Gisle Johnson as unpassable, under a certain influence from free-thinkers Søren Kierkegaard and Georg Brandes. Johnson disciple and bishop Johan Christian Heuch in 1902 declared Jansen as a "dangerous" man, citing that his liberal tendencies could open Christendom for "Muhammedans and pagans".

Jansen died while vacationing in Ringebu Municipality in 1912.
