= Johnsson =

Johnsson is a Swedish surname meaning "son of John". Notable people with this surname include:

- Andreas Johnsson, Swedish ice hockey player
- Christofer Johnsson, Swedish heavy metal musician
- Helén Johnsson (born 1976), Swedish ten-pin bowler
- Kim Johnsson, Swedish ice hockey player
- Peter Johnsson (born 1962), Swedish politician
- Sonja Johnsson, Swedish Swimmer
- William G. Johnsson, former editor of the Adventist Review
