= Yiota Ioannidou =

Cypriot artist

- Born: Yiota Ioannidou; 4 February 1971 (age 55); Paphos, Cyprus
- Education: Athens School of Fine Arts
- Occupation: Sculptor
- Years active: 1994–present
- Notable work: The Girl and the Sparrow, Divine Shells, Icarus
- Spouse: Charalambos Stylianou
- Children: Karolos Stylianou, Alkinoos Stylianou
- Website: www.yiotaioannidou.com

Yiota Ioannidou (born 4 February 1971) is a Cypriot artist based in Paphos, best known for sculpting The Girl and the Sparrow and the Divine Shells. Her sculptures are positioned in various locations within Paphos, such as on the Paphos Harbour, Old Town Paphos, and Argaka. They have also been displayed in the United States, Kuwait and Greece.

== Biography ==
Yiota Ioannidou was born in Paphos, in the Republic of Cyprus and studied at the Athens School of Fine Arts. She studied with Stavros Valasakis and Panayiotis Tetsis, who both significantly influenced her work.

== Published works ==
She has created several sculptures, such as a two-meter sculpture depicting the mythical Queen of Cyprus, Rigena, in a harbour in Cyprus, The Girl and the Sparrow, Icarus and Birds of Hope.

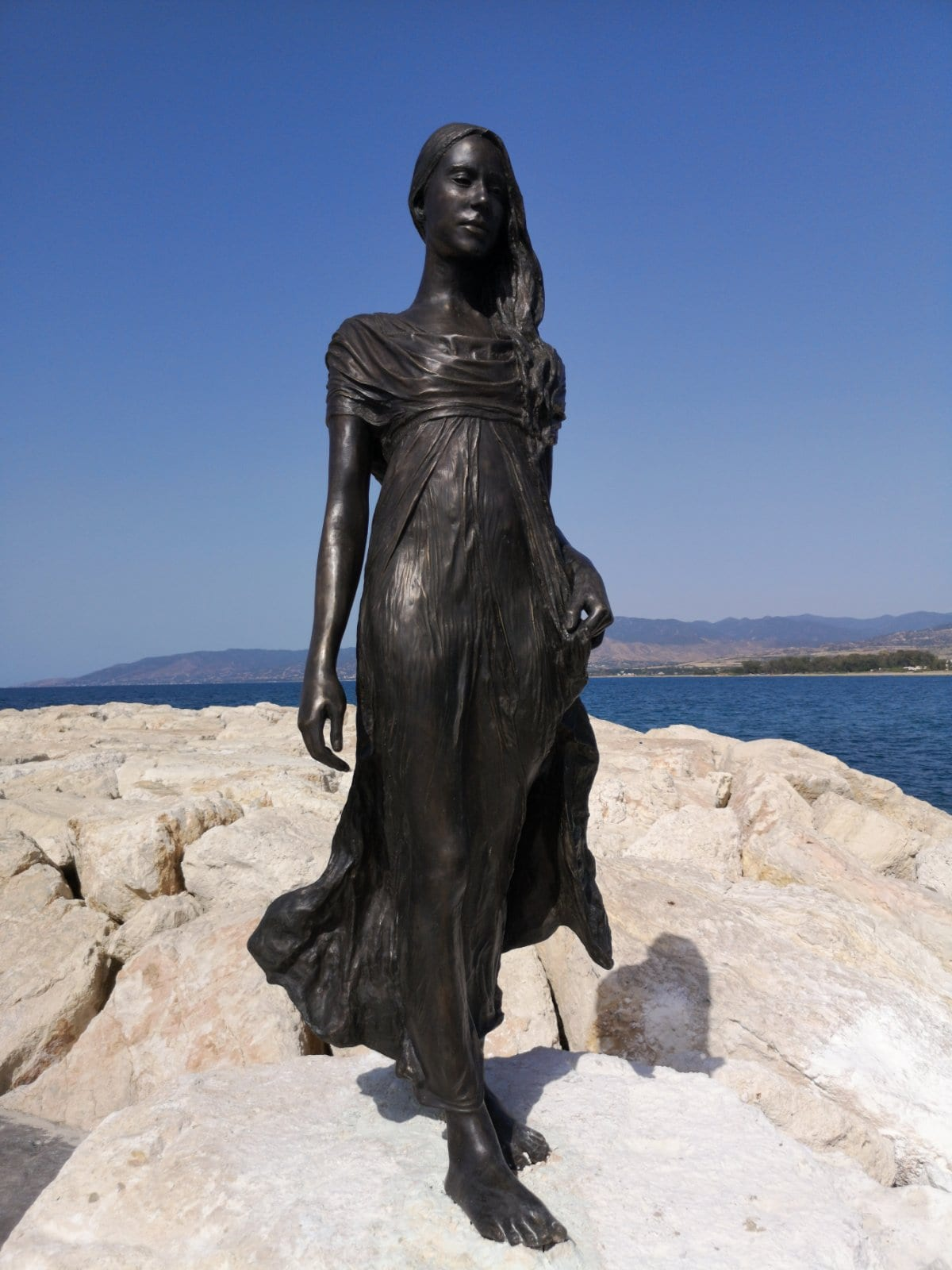
Queen of Cyprus, Rigena

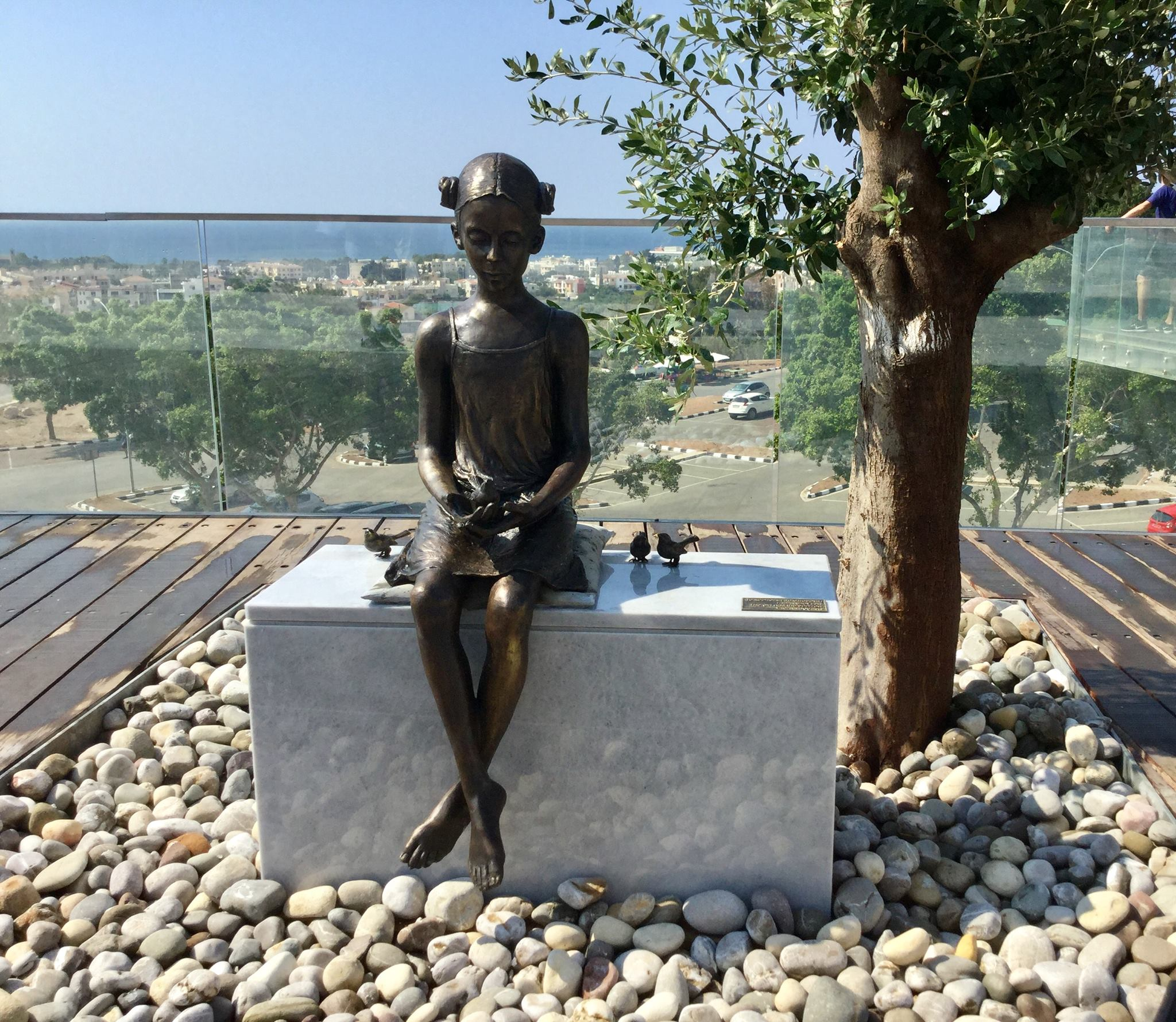
The Girl & the Sparrow

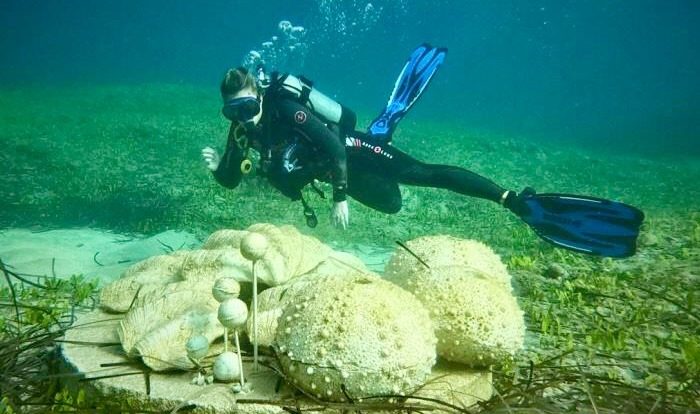
Divine Shells

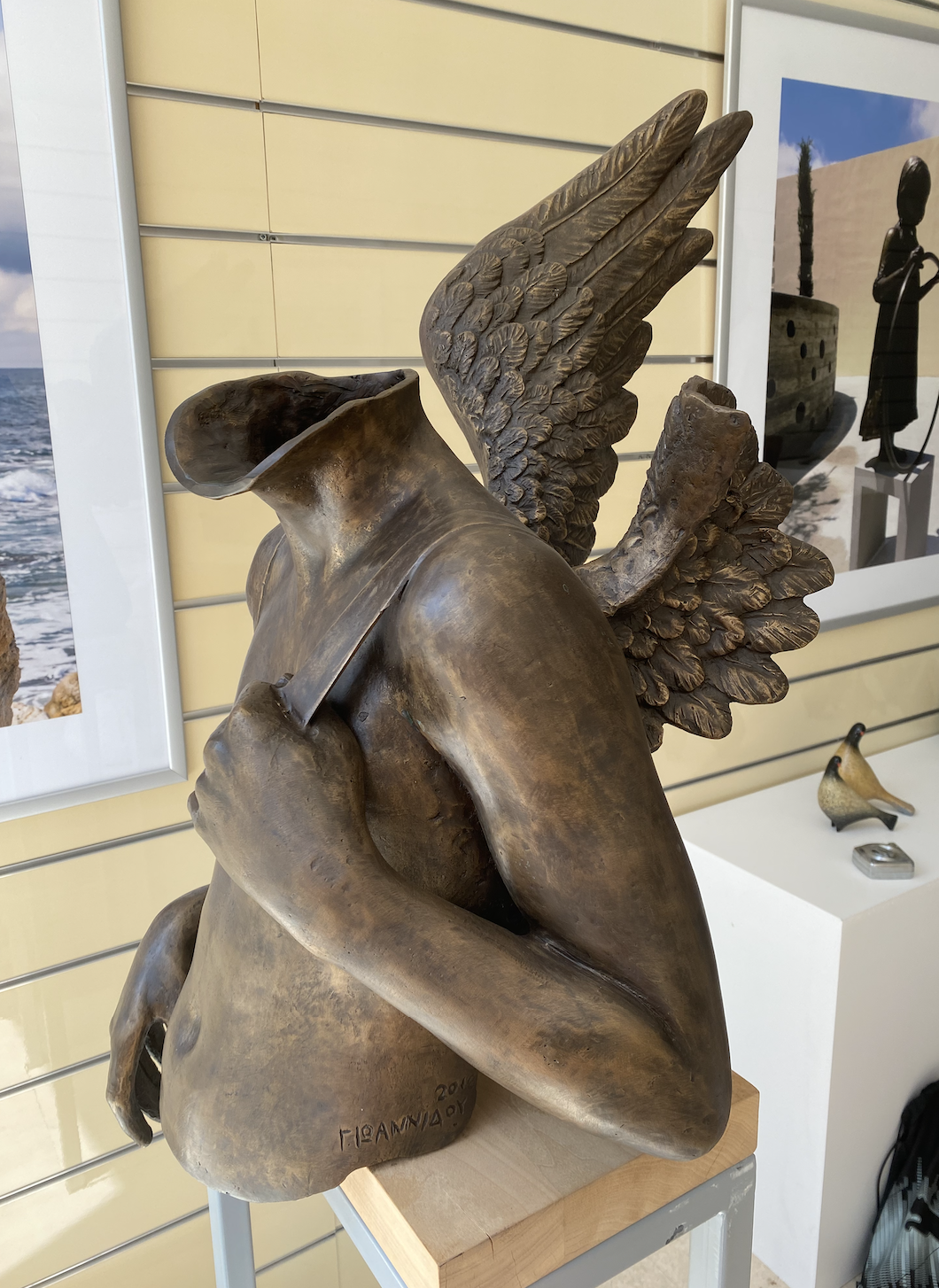
Icarus

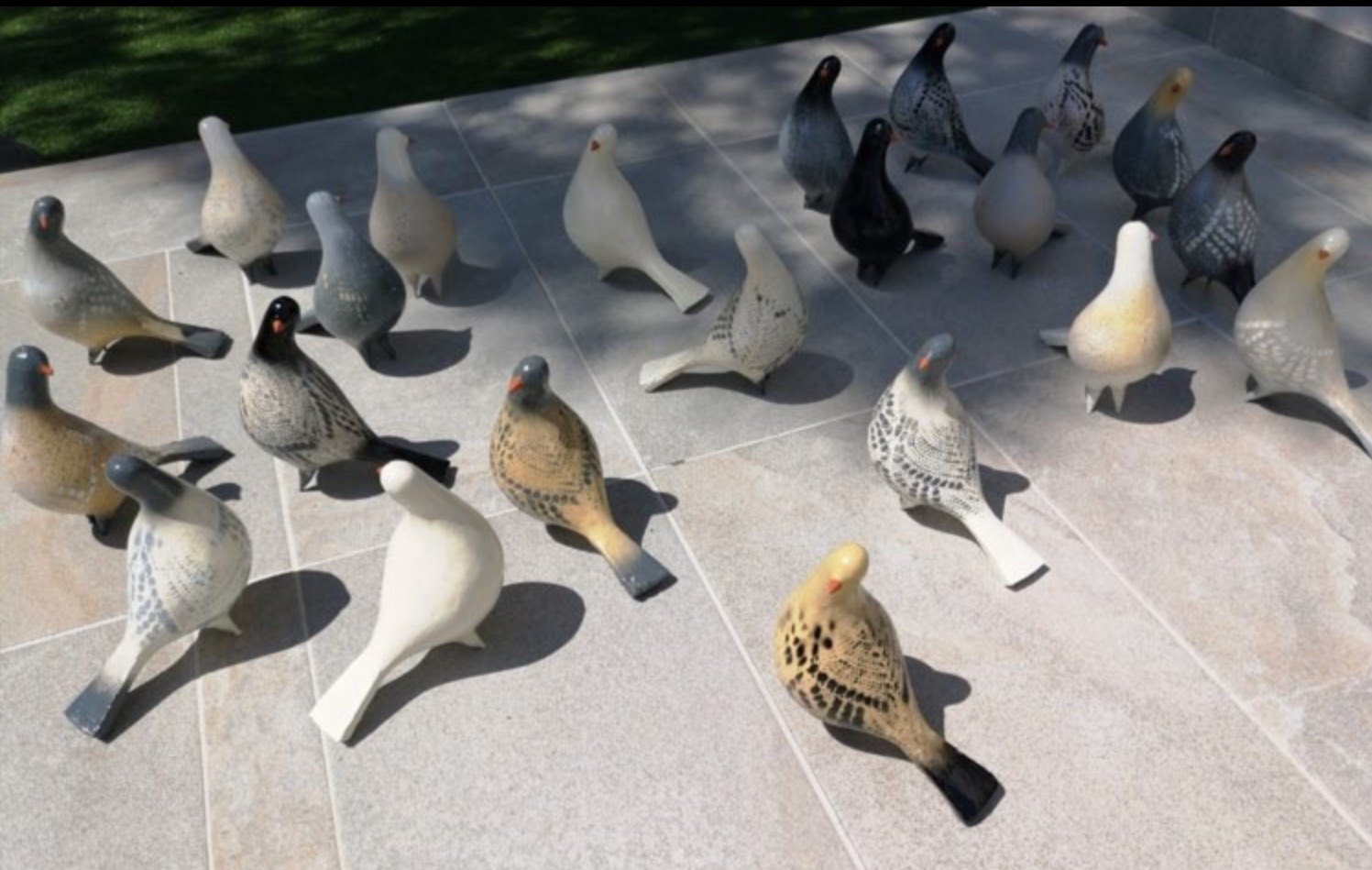
Birds of Hope

== Honours, Decorations, Awards, and Distinctions ==
Her art Divine Shells earned recognition from Nicosia Tourism Board and the Paphos Region Tourism Development for its innovation. It positively influenced oceanic biodiversity by creating a habitable environment. Organization European Capital of Culture - Paphos 2017 was also impressed with her work, and it allowed the art to be publicly displayed and reach a wider audience.
