= Ada Jansen =

Dutch politician (born 1942)

Agatha Baas-Jansen

Dutch House of Representatives
- In office May 1988 – September 1989
- Monarch: Beatrix
- Prime Minister: Wim Kok

Personal details
- Born: 5 July 1942 (age 83)
- Party: Christian Democratic Appèl
- Spouse: Dick Baas
- Occupation: Police officer

Agatha Baas-Jansen, or better known as Ada Jansen, (born 5 July 1942) is a Dutch police officer and politician.

== Career ==
Jansen was in the police in Nijmegen when she became interested in the care of those with mental disabilities and undertook related studies. Until 1980 she was in the Anti-Revolutionary Party, but on 11 October she joined the Christian Democratic Appèl.

From May 1988 to September 1989, she was elected to the House of Representatives. She assisted with police related matters, emancipation, minorities and in particular with that of Chinese people in the Netherlands.

== Personal life ==
Her husband, Dick Baas, was an alderman of Nunspeet.
