= Einar Jansen =

Norwegian historian, genealogist and archivist (1893–1960)

- Born: 27 March 1893; Røyken
- Died: 13 December 1960 (aged 67)

Einar Jansen (27 March 1893 – 13 December 1960) was a Norwegian historian, genealogist and archivist.

He was born in Røyken as the son of priest Jens Jonas Jansen (1844–1912) and Jenny Therese Schroeter (1863–1942). He was a nephew of Jens Fredrik Schroeter. The family soon moved to Sandvika, and after finishing his secondary education in 1911, he enrolled in philology at the University of Kristiania, graduating with the cand.philol. degree in 1919. His final paper, Det suspensive lovvetos anvendelse i norsk konstitusjonel praksis, mixed history and constitutional law.

He worked in the National Archives of Norway from 1921 to 1934, and then as the leader of the National Archival Services of Norway in Bergen from 1934 to 1960. He then resigned to write a major genealogical work, but died before New Year.

He was also a member of the editorial staff of the biographical dictionary Norsk biografisk leksikon. He began working there in 1924, and soon became editor-in-chief, as the three editors-in-chief Anders Krogvig, Gerhard Gran and Edvard Bull, Sr. died in 1924, 1925 and 1932 respectively. His period as editor-in-chief spanned the volumes three through fourteen. From 1934 Jansen had a number of co-editors, including A. W. Brøgger, Paulus Svendsen, Øyvind Anker and his brother Jonas Jansen. Also, in September 1934 he married genealogist Ebba Martha Lassen, née Ertsgaard.

Jansen was also a member of the board of the Norwegian Genealogical Society from 1926 to 1935 and Landslaget for Bygde- og Byhistorie from 1941 to 1958, and a council member of the Selskapet til Vitenskapenes Fremme from 1935 to 1941. He was the vice leader of the trade union Arkivarforeningen from 1936 to 1941 and 1945 to 1947.
