= Victor Jansen =

Brazilian politician (born 2001)

Member of the Legislative Chamber of the Federal District
- Incumbent
- Assumed office 1 February 2027

Personal details
- Born: 13 July 2001 (age 25)
- Party: Liberal Party

Victor Jansen Ferreira (born 13 July 2001) is a Brazilian politician who was elected member of the Legislative Chamber of the Federal District in 2026. He was the youngest member of the Chamber elected in 2026.
