= Adam Jansen =

American archivist

State Archivist, State of Hawaii Archives
- Preceded by: Susan Shaner

Personal details
- Education: University of Wisconsin; Eastern Washington University, University of British Columbia School of Library, Archival and Information Studies

Adam Jansen is the state archivist for the Hawaii State Archives, where he works on digital records and accessibility. He was previously the digital archivist for the State of Washington, where he managed the Washington State Digital Archives, a digital archive for both state and local government. Jansen also worked for the Praxeum Group providing consulting archival services for the Hawaii State Digital Archives.

The State Archives’ mission is to ensure open government by preserving and making accessible the historic records of state government and to partner with state agencies to manage their active and inactive records. Jansen is a published author and international speaker on the topic of Emerging technologies and Electronic records management issues. Jansen has a background in records management and archival strategies.

Jansen holds certifications, including Certified Records Manager, Microsoft Certified Professional, Master of Information Technology, and Certified Document Imaging Architect. He also served on the board of directors for the National Association of Government Archives and Records Administrators.

Jansen previously worked at Microsoft to design the process of data archiving from the ingestion of the data, storage of the data, and presentation of the data. This allowed for a record processing system for the digital archives to adapt to the various types and formats of incoming records while at the same time recording metadata to facilitate document searches.

In 2016, Adam Jansen married Miki Karukaya in Honolulu, Hawaiʻi.
