= Slemmestad =

Village in Asker municipality, Norway

Coordinates: 59°47′N 10°30′E

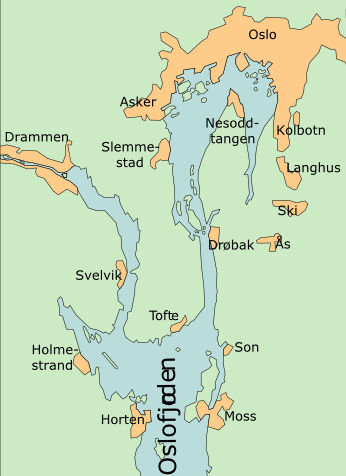
Map of Oslofjord showing Slemmestad

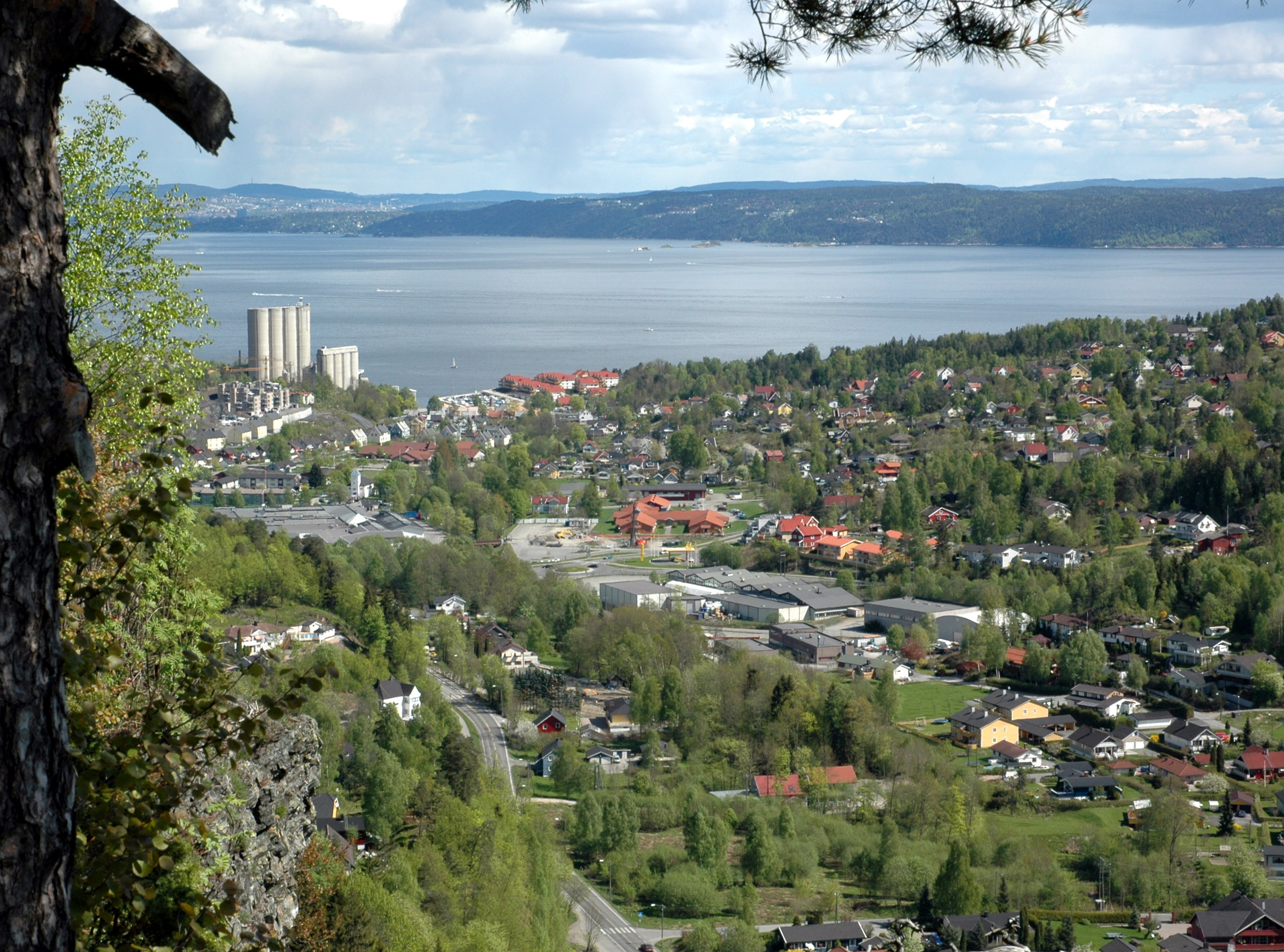
Slemmestad seen from Bøsnipa hill

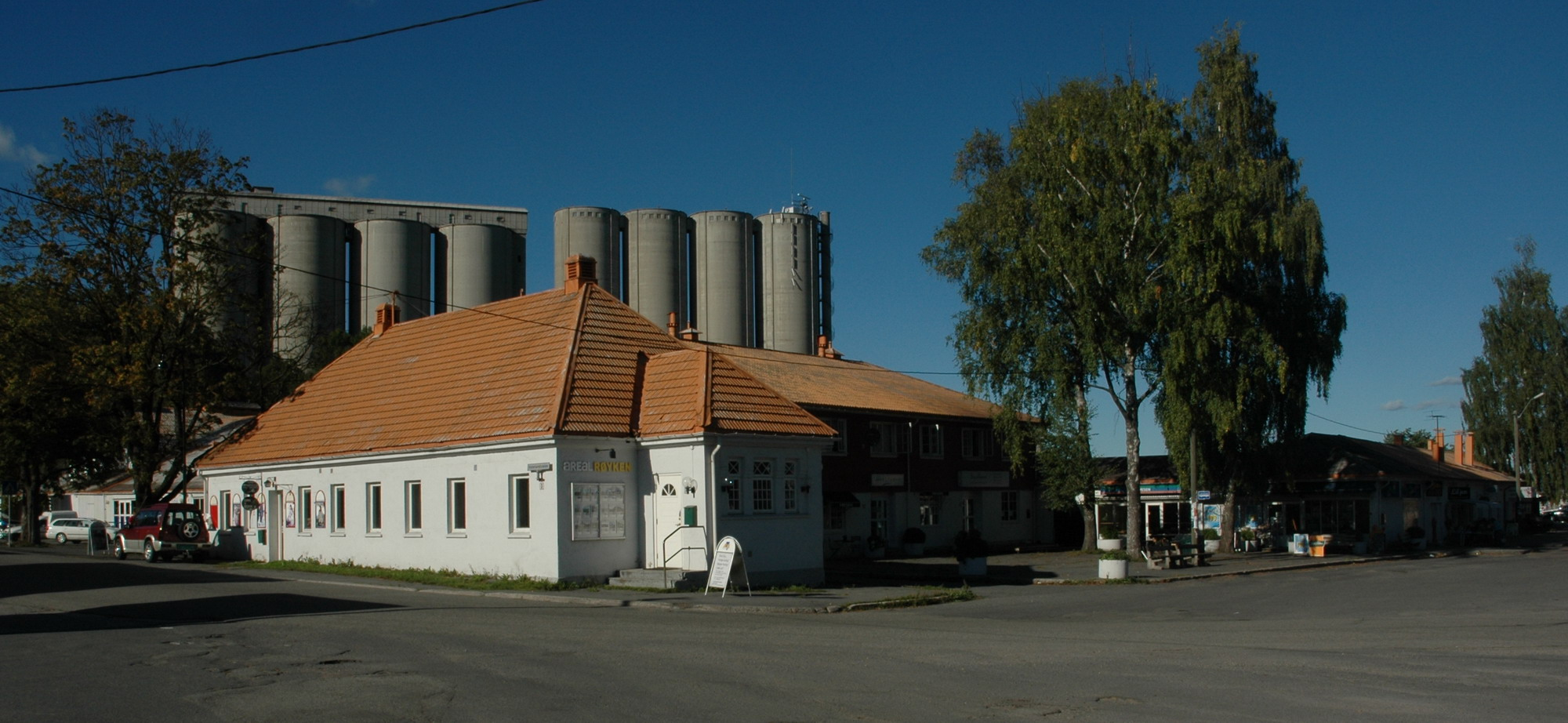
Part of the old cement plant

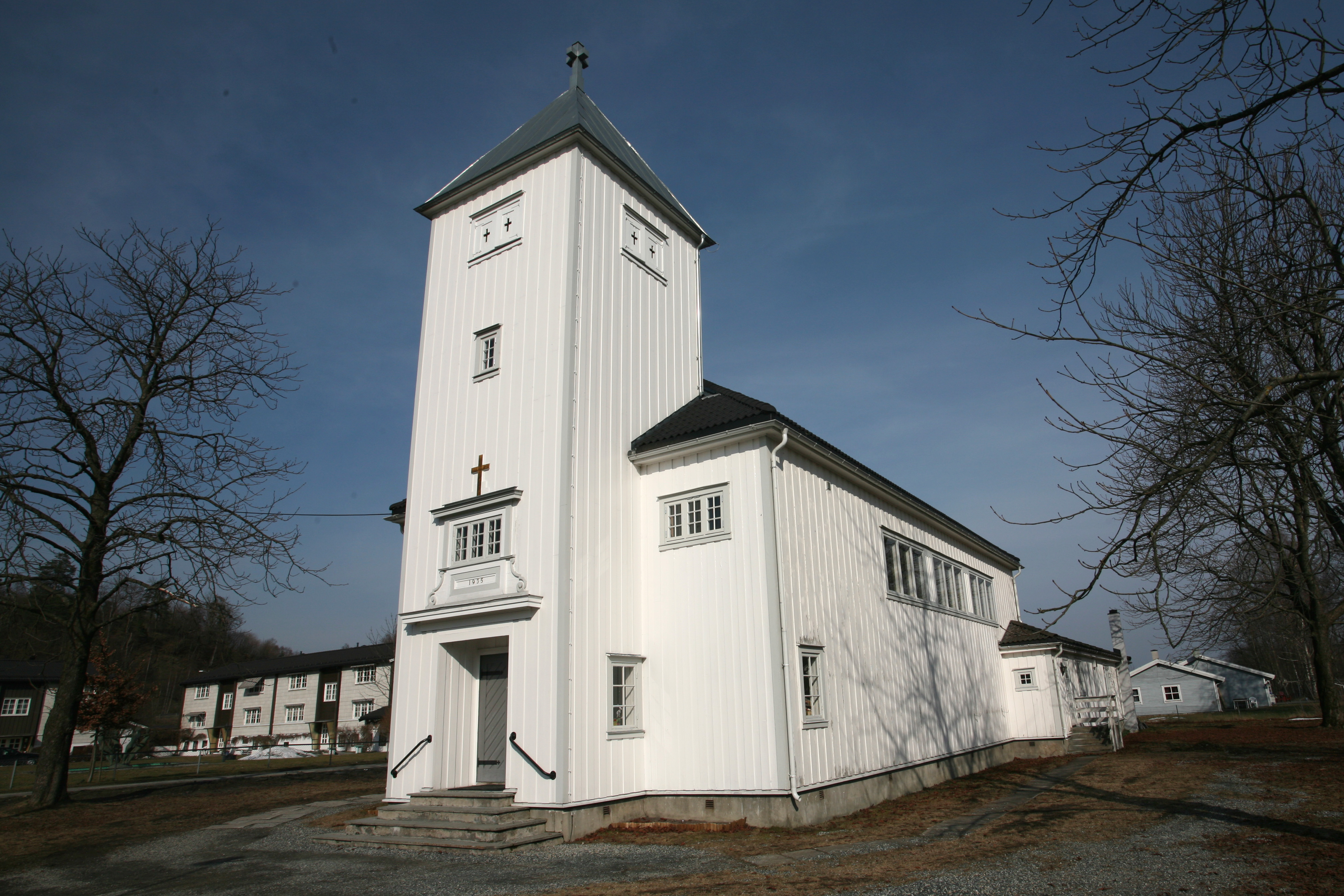
Slemmestad Church

Slemmestad is a village in Røyken in Asker Municipality in Akershus, Norway. Slemmestad is located on the west bank of the Oslofjord, west of Oslo.

== History ==
Historically Slemmestad was located on the old highway running between Oslo and Drammen. Until the establishment of cement factory in 1892, this was a pure farming village. The largest farms were the Lillelien, together with øvre and nedre Slemmestad. Slemmestad was built around the Aktieselskabet Christiania Portland Cementfabrik cement plant.

== Geography ==
Slemmestad forms part of the Oslo Geological Region (Oslofeltet). This is an ancient, sunken part of the crust reaching in the south at sea level and extending north to Brumunddal in Ringsaker Municipality in Innlandet County. By subsidence, the Oslo field had preserved a comprehensive sequence of shale, limestone, siltstone and sandstone of the Cambrian period.

== Slemmestad Cement Museum ==
Slemmestad Cement Museum (Slemmestad Cementmuseum) is located in the cement factory's former bag factory in Slemmestad. The museum was opened in 1991. It features photographs, artifacts, records and other documentation that shows 100 years of development of cement production and the great importance of the factory was Slemmestad and the people who lived there.

== Media ==
The newspaper Røyken og Hurums Avis was published in Slemmestad from 1976 to 2003.

== Slemmestad Church ==
Slemmestad Church (Slemmestad kirke) is a wooden structure and has 200 seats. It was dedicated on 25 August 1935. The architect for the church was Ivar Næss (1878–1936). The building was expanded eastward in 1960 with vestry and secondary rooms, and this extension was extended eastwards in 1978. Slemmestad chapel and cemetery are in the southern part of the village, around half kilometer from Slemmestad Church. The cemetery was inaugurated in autumn 1923.

== Notable residents ==
- Melissa Wiik, Footballer who plays for Urædd FK
- Bjørge Lillelien, Sports journalist

== Other sources ==
- Gartmann, Frithjof (1990) Sement i Norge 100 år (Oslo)
- Søbye, Øystein (1997) Bak syv blåner (Oslo: Orion forlag)
