= Clinical physiology =

Academic discipline and clinical medical specialty

Clinical physiology is an academic discipline within the medical sciences and a clinical medical specialty for physicians in the health care systems of Sweden, Denmark, Finland, and Portugal. Clinical physiology is characterized as a branch of physiology that uses a functional approach to understand the pathophysiology of a disease.

== Overview ==
As a specialty for medical doctors, clinical physiology is a diagnostic specialty in which patients are subjected to specialized tests for the functions of the heart, blood vessels, lungs, kidneys and gastrointestinal tract, and other organs. Testing methods include evaluation of electrical activity (e.g. electrocardiogram of the heart), blood pressure (e.g. ankle brachial pressure index), and air flow (e.g. pulmonary function testing using spirometry). In addition, Clinical Physiologists measure movements, velocities, and metabolic processes through imaging techniques such as ultrasound, echocardiography, magnetic resonance imaging (MRI), x-ray computed tomography (CT), and nuclear medicine scanners (e.g. single photon emission computed tomography (SPECT) and positron emission tomography (PET) with and without CT or MRI).

== History ==
The field of clinical physiology was originally founded by Professor Torgny Sjöstrand in Sweden, and it continues to make its way around the world in other hospitals and academic environments. Sjöstrand was the first to establish departments for clinical physiology separate from those of physiology, during his work at the Karolinska Hospital in Stockholm. Along with Sjöstrand, another influential name in clinical physiology was P.K Anokhin. Anohkin heavily contributed to the branch of physiology where he worked diligently to use his theories of functional systems to solve medical mysteries amongst his patients.

In Sweden, clinical physiology was originally a separate medical specialty and discipline. However, between 2008 and 2015, clinical physiology was categorized as a sub-discipline of radiology. For this reason, medical doctors pursuing specialist qualifications in clinical physiology at that time had to first become registered and certified radiologists before becoming clinical physiologists. Since 2015, clinical physiology has been a separate medical specialty and discipline, independent of radiology.

== Role ==
Human physiology is the study of bodily functions. Clinical physiology examinations typically involve assessments of such functions as opposed to assessments of structures and anatomy. The specialty encompasses the development of new physiological tests for medical diagnostics. Using equipments to measure, monitor and record patients proves very helpful for patients in many hospitals. Moreover, it is helpful to doctors, making it possible for patients to be diagnosed correctly. Some Clinical Physiology departments perform tests from related medical specialties including nuclear medicine, clinical neurophysiology, and radiology. In the health care systems of countries that lack this specialty, the tests performed in clinical physiology are often performed by the various organ-specific specialties in internal medicine, such as cardiology, pulmonology, nephrology, and others.

In Australia, the United Kingdom, and many other commonwealth and European countries, clinical physiology is not a medical specialty for physicians. It is individually a non-medical allied health profession - scientist, physiologist or technologist - who may practice as a cardiac scientist, critical care scientist, vascular scientist, respiratory scientist, sleep scientist or in Ophthalmic and Vision Science as an Ophthalmic Science Practitioner (UK). These professionals also aid in the diagnosis of disease and manage patients, with an emphasis on understanding physiological and pathophysiological pathways. Disciplines within clinical physiology field include audiologists, cardiac physiologists, critical care scientists, gastro-intestinal physiologists, neurophysiologists, respiratory physiologists, and sleep physiologists.
