= Røyken =

Røyken Municipality Røyken kommune
- Municipality
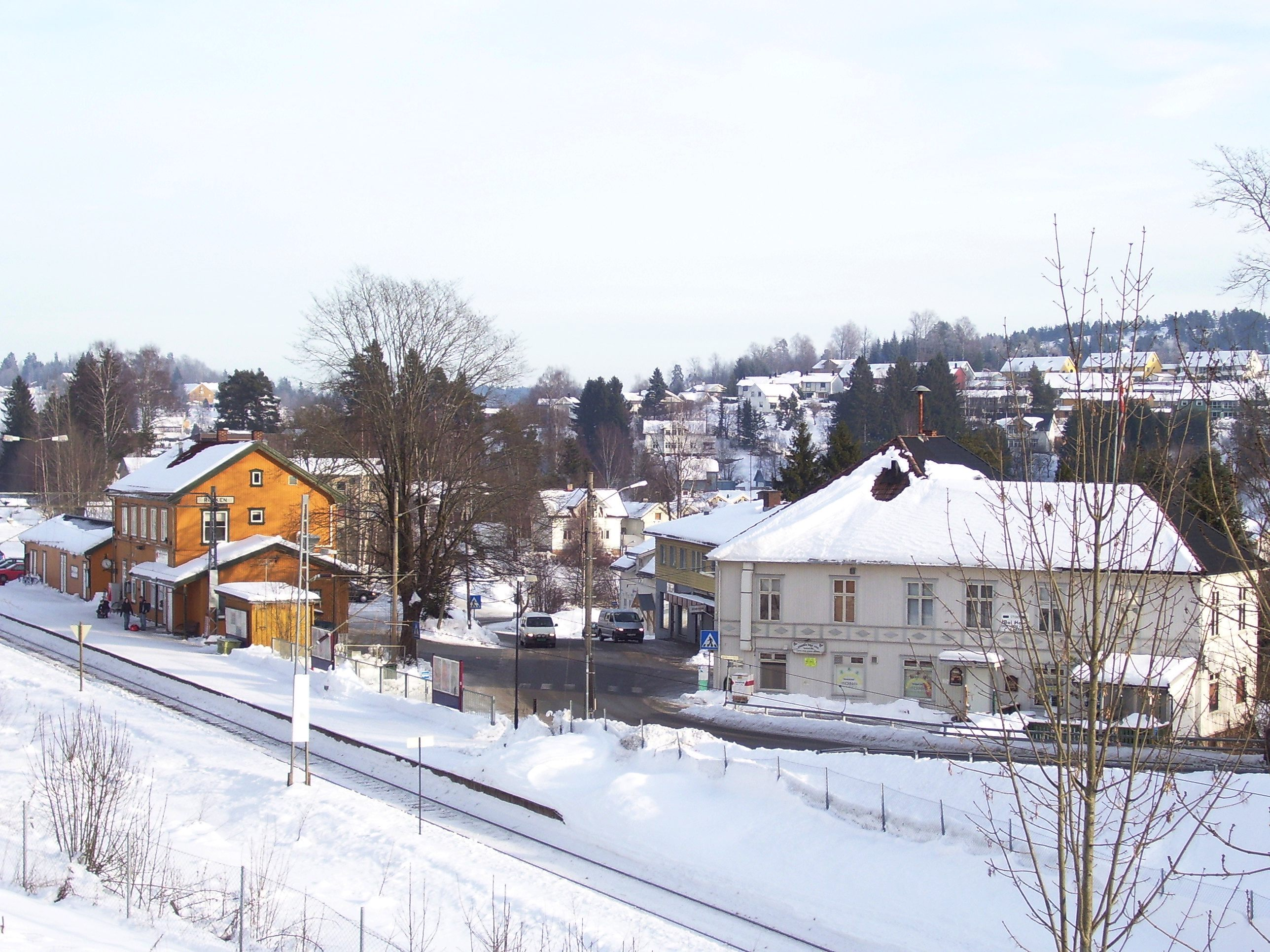

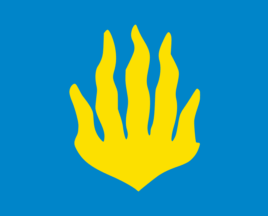
- Flag Coat of arms

- Buskerud within Norway

- Røyken within Buskerud
- Coordinates: 59°44′1″N 10°25′44″E
- Country: Norway
- County: Buskerud
- District: Lower Buskerud
- Administrative centre: Midtbygda

Government
  - Mayor (2015): Eva Norén Eriksen (H)

Area
  - Total: 113 km^{2} (44 sq mi)
  - Land: 111 km^{2} (43 sq mi)
  - Rank: #378 in Norway

Population (2014)
  - Total: 20,621
  - Rank: #59 in Norway
  - Density: 153/km^{2} (400/sq mi)
  - Change (10 years): ▲ +15.2%
- Demonym: Røykenbøring

Official language
  - Norwegian form: Bokmål
- Time zone: UTC+01:00 (CET)
  - Summer (DST): UTC+02:00 (CEST)
- ISO 3166 code: NO-0627
- Website: Official website

Røyken is a district and village (bygd) and a former municipality in Buskerud, Norway. In 2020 Røyken was merged with the municipalities of Hurum and Asker to form the new Asker Municipality (informally called "Greater Asker") located in the newly formed Viken county. Because Viken ceased to exist, the entirety of the new Asker Municipality became part of Akershus County. The administrative center of the municipality is the village of Midtbygda. The parish of Røken was established as a municipality on 1 January 1838 (see formannskapsdistrikt).

Oslo ATCC, the Area Control Center for the controlled airspace above Østlandet is located here.

== General information ==
=== Name ===
The municipality (originally the parish) is named after the old Røyken farm (Norse Raukvin), since the first church was built there. The first element is raukr which means "pile, stack; mountain" and the last element is vin which means "meadow" or "pasture".

=== Coat-of-arms ===
The coat-of-arms is from modern times. They were granted on 15 December 1967. The figure shows a yellow fire on a blue background. It was chosen as a semi-canting symbol to represent smoke (which cannot be depicted in heraldry). The background for the motif is a common misunderstanding of the name as røyken the definite form of røyk meaning "smoke".

Number of minorities (1st and 2nd generation) in Røyken by country of origin in 2017
Ancestry	Number
Poland	829
Lithuania	253
Sweden	216
Germany	172
Denmark	164
India	113
Pakistan	109
Afghanistan	104
UK	96
Iran	85

== Geography ==
Røyken is located south of Lier and Asker, on the northern part of the Hurum peninsula north of Hurum municipality. It lies between Oslofjord and Drammensfjord. It is connected to the eastern side of the Oslofjord via Hurum municipality and the Oslofjord Tunnel. The tunnel is 7.2 kilometres (4.5 mi) long and connects Hurumhalvøya to Akershus county.

The district includes large amounts of residential zones with beautiful sights of the sea. The administration is situated in the village of Midtbygda. The main population centers are the villages of Hyggen, Hallenskog, Midtbygda, Nærsnes, Røyken, Slemmestad, Spikkestad, and Åros. Many people live in the northern part of Bødalen and its vicinities, which is a continuous residential area that continues throughout Asker and Bærum to Oslo.

== Municipality Reform ==
As part of the municipality reform process instigated by Minister of Local Government Jan Tore Sanner the municipalities of Asker, Hurum and Røyken evaluated if they should merge into a new common municipality during the first half of 2016. A tentative agreement was reached and on 16 June 2016 the Municipal Council of Røyken approved the merger with Asker and Hurum with 24 votes for and 3 against. The merger date was 1 January 2020 and the chosen name was Asker.

== Notable people ==
- Einar Jansen (1893 in Røyken – 1960) a Norwegian historian, genealogist and archivist
- Jonas Fjeldstad (1894 in Røyken – 1985) a prize-winning oceanographer and mathematician
- Ove Bang (1895 in Røyken – 1942) a Norwegian architect, advocated functionalism in architecture
- Eberhart Jensen (1922 in Røyken – 2003) a Norwegian astrophysicist
- Bjørge Lillelien (1927 in Slemmestad – 1987) a sports journalist and commentator for NRK
- Kate Gulbrandsen (born 1965 in Slemmestad) one of Norway's former Eurovision singers
- Melissa Wiik (born 1985 in Slemmestad) a footballer with 200 club caps and 63 for Norway women
- Torbjørn Bergerud (born 1994 in Åros) a handball player for Kolstad Håndball and the Norwegian handball team.

== Gallery ==
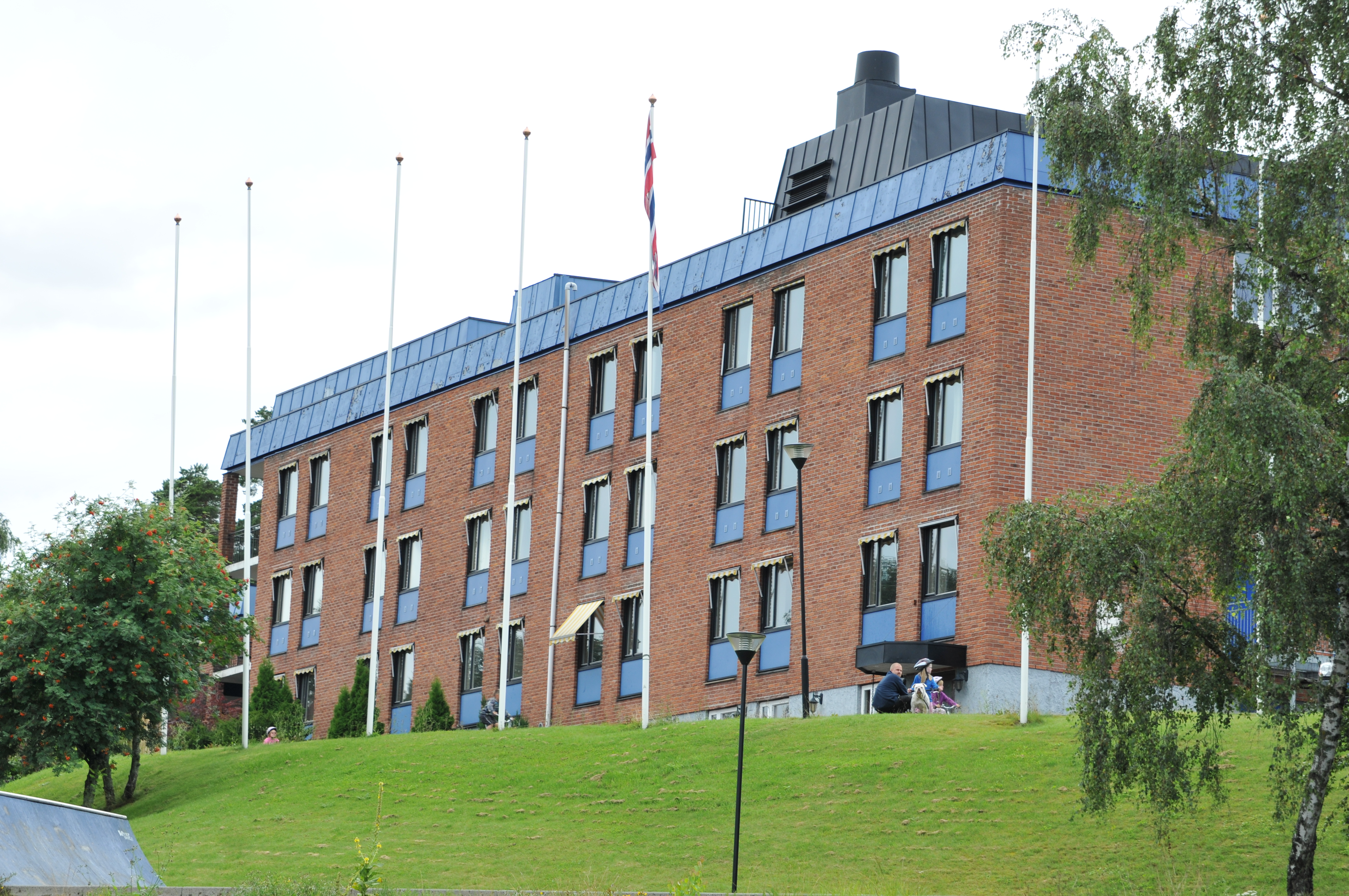
Røyken Steiner High School

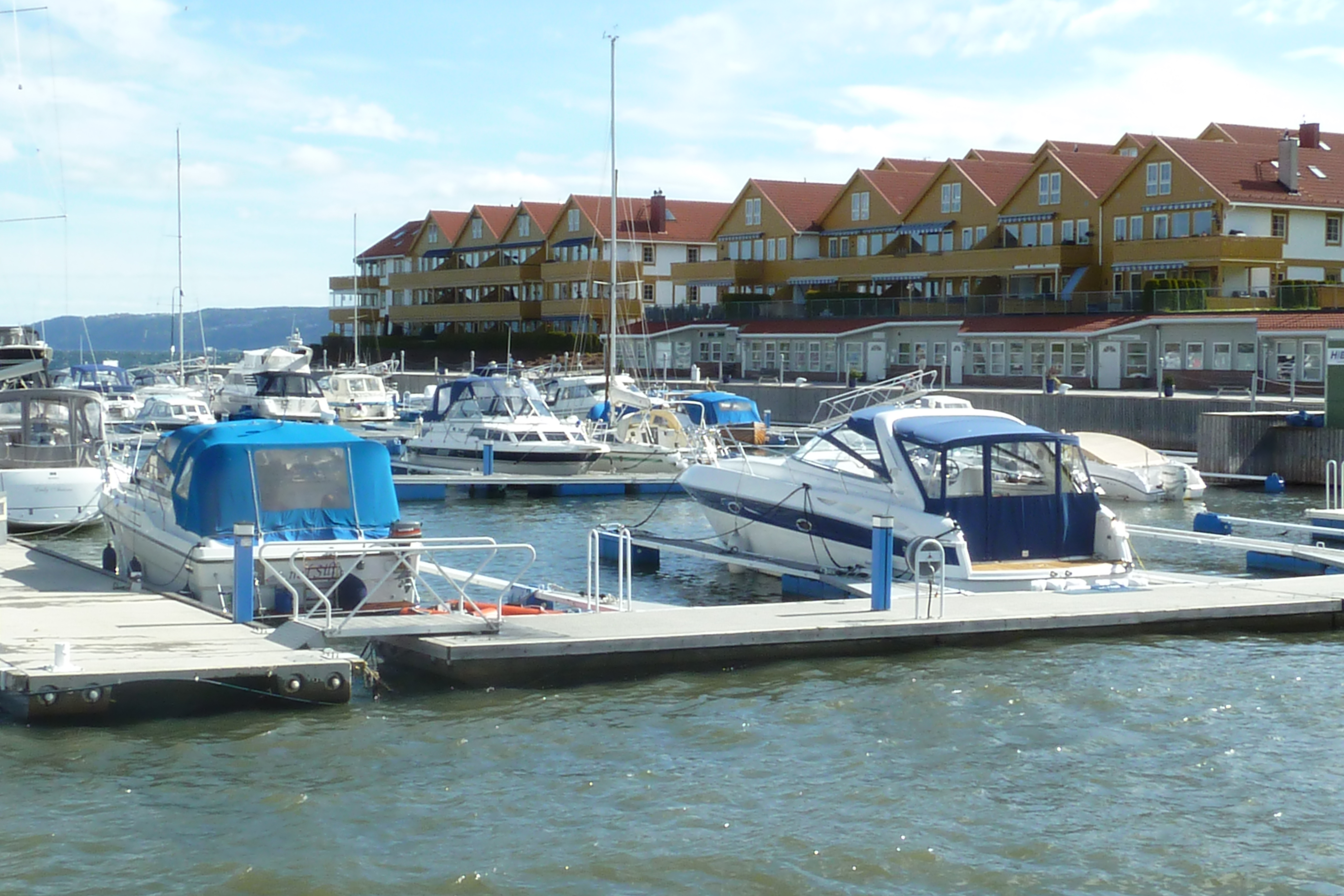
Odden Marina

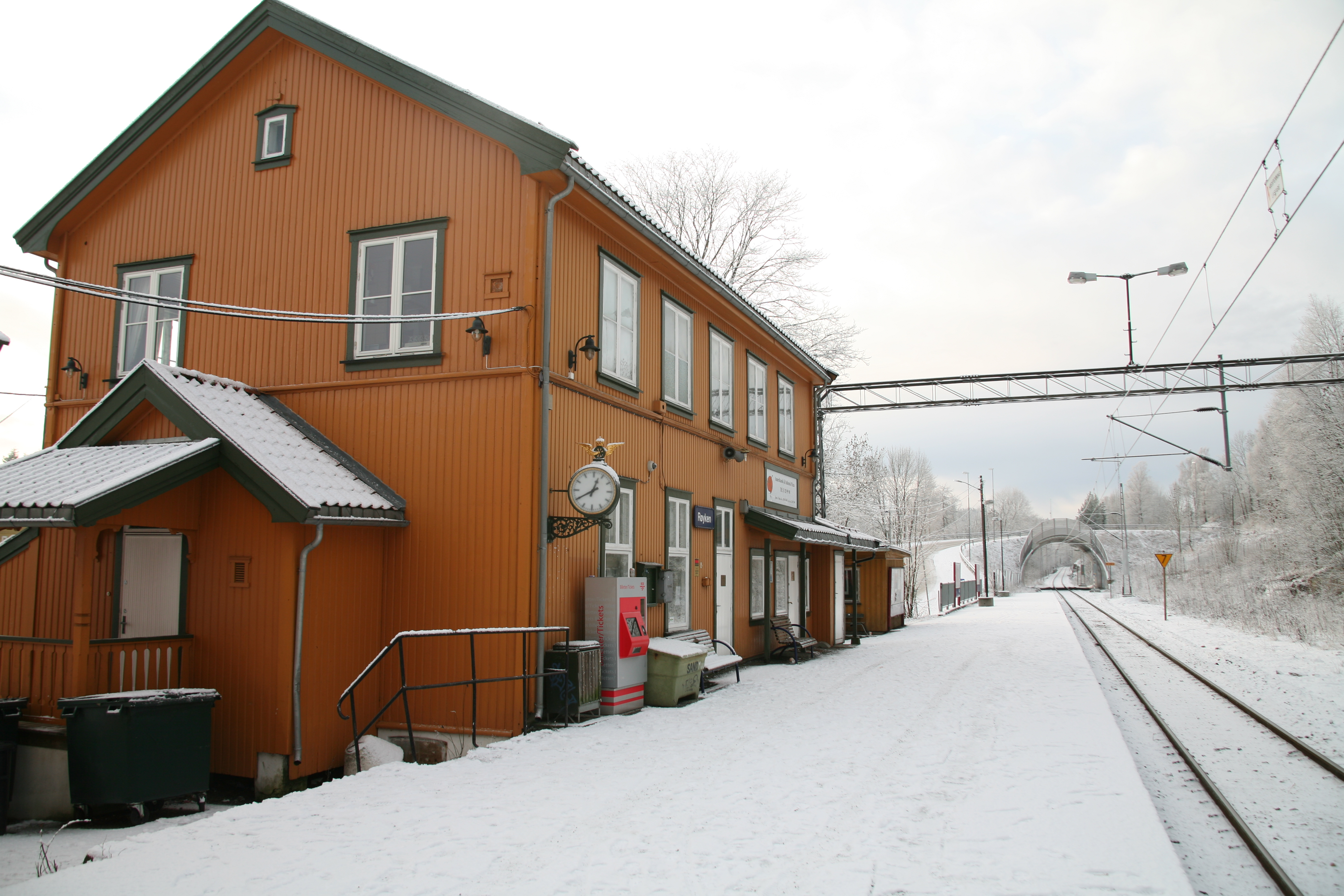
Røyken Rail Station

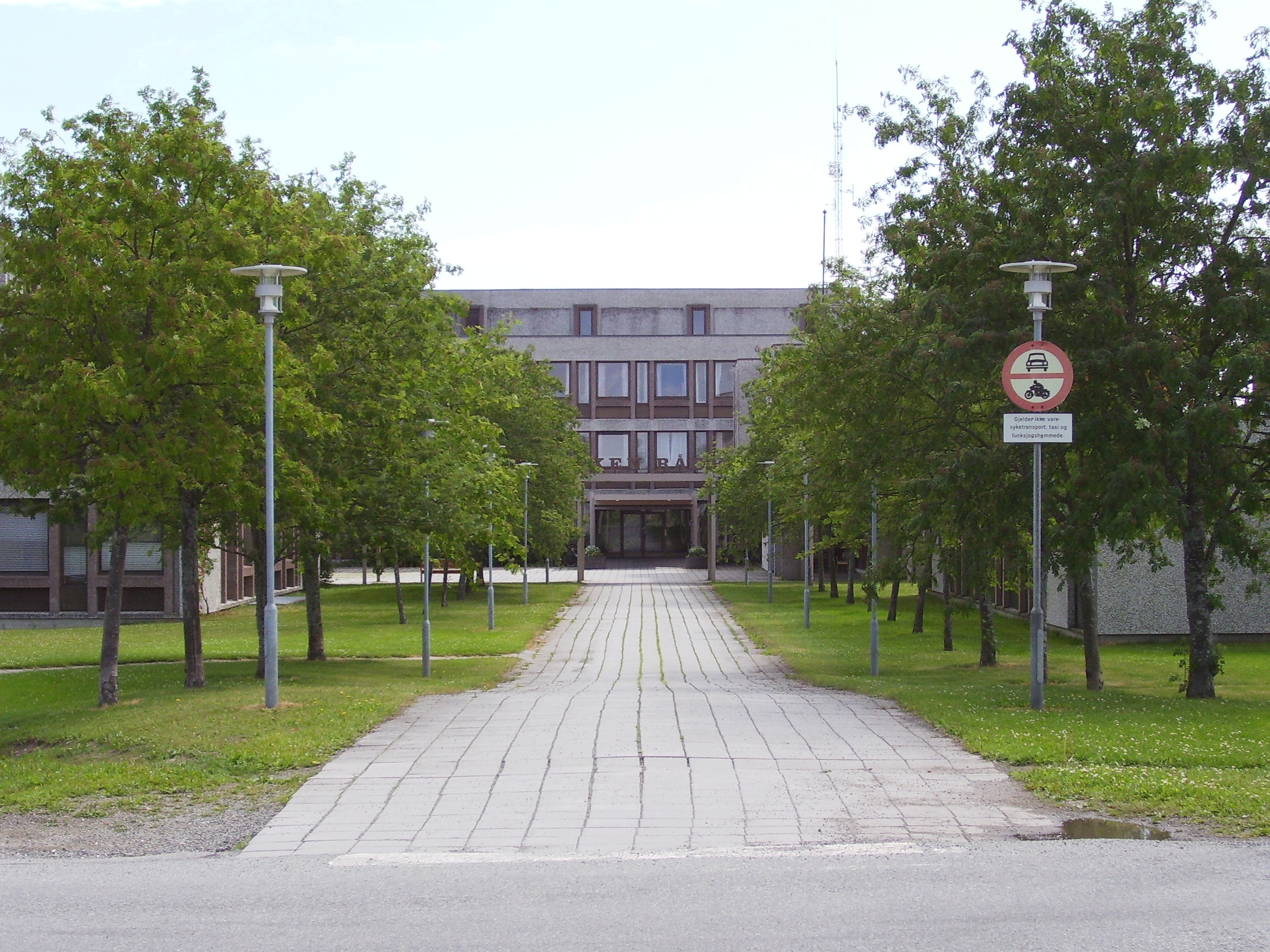
Røyken City Hall

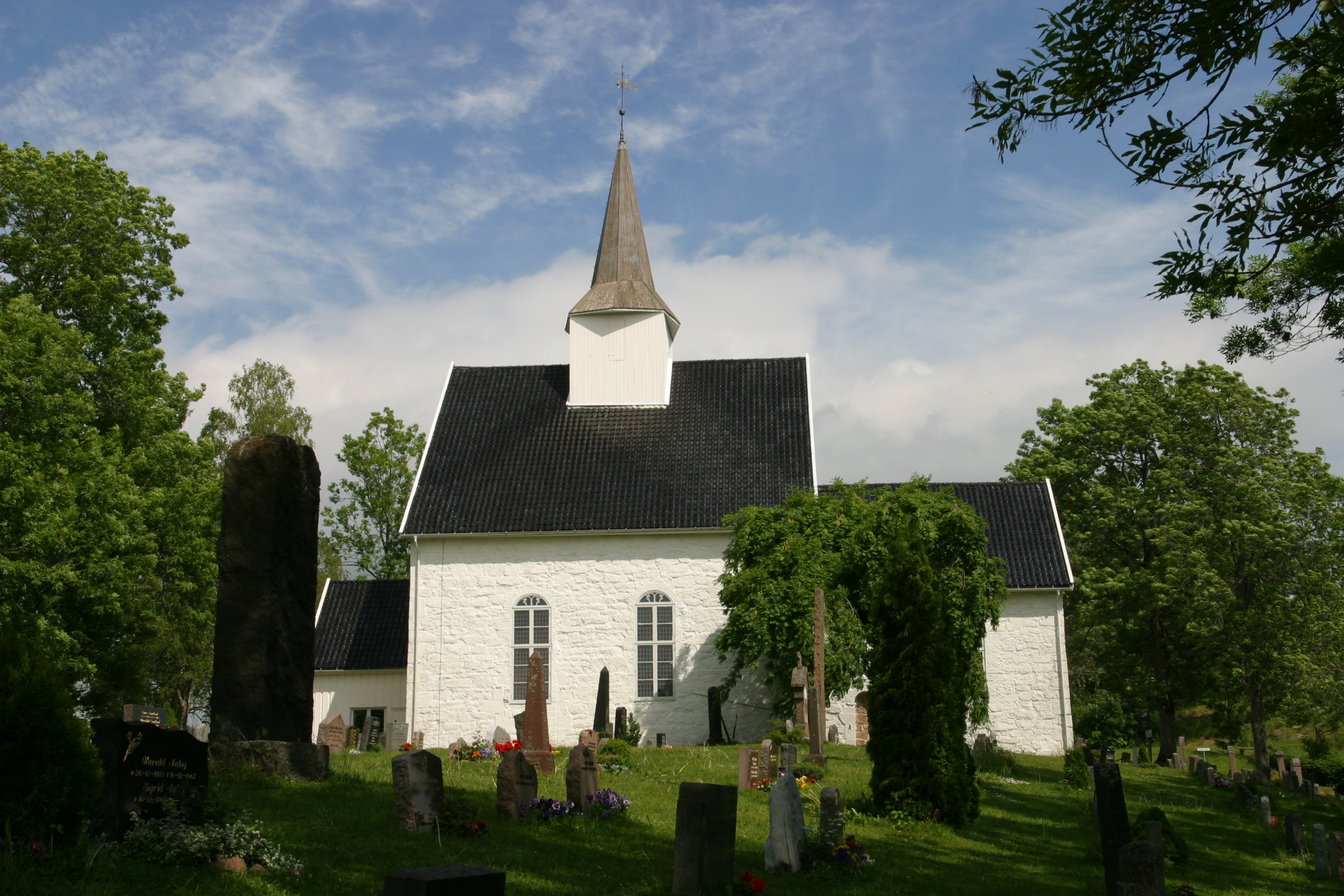
Røyken Church

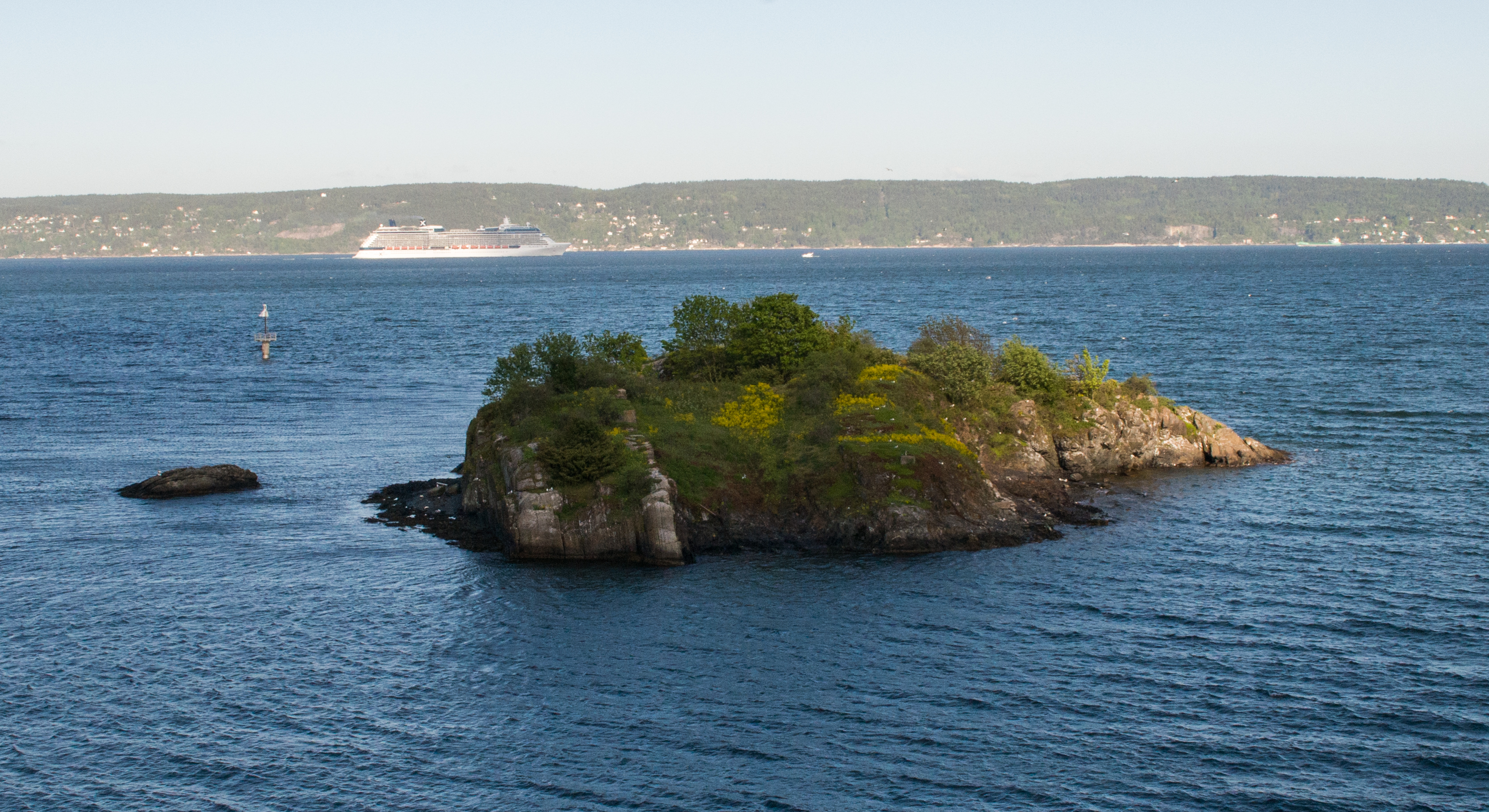
Geitungsholmen nature reserve

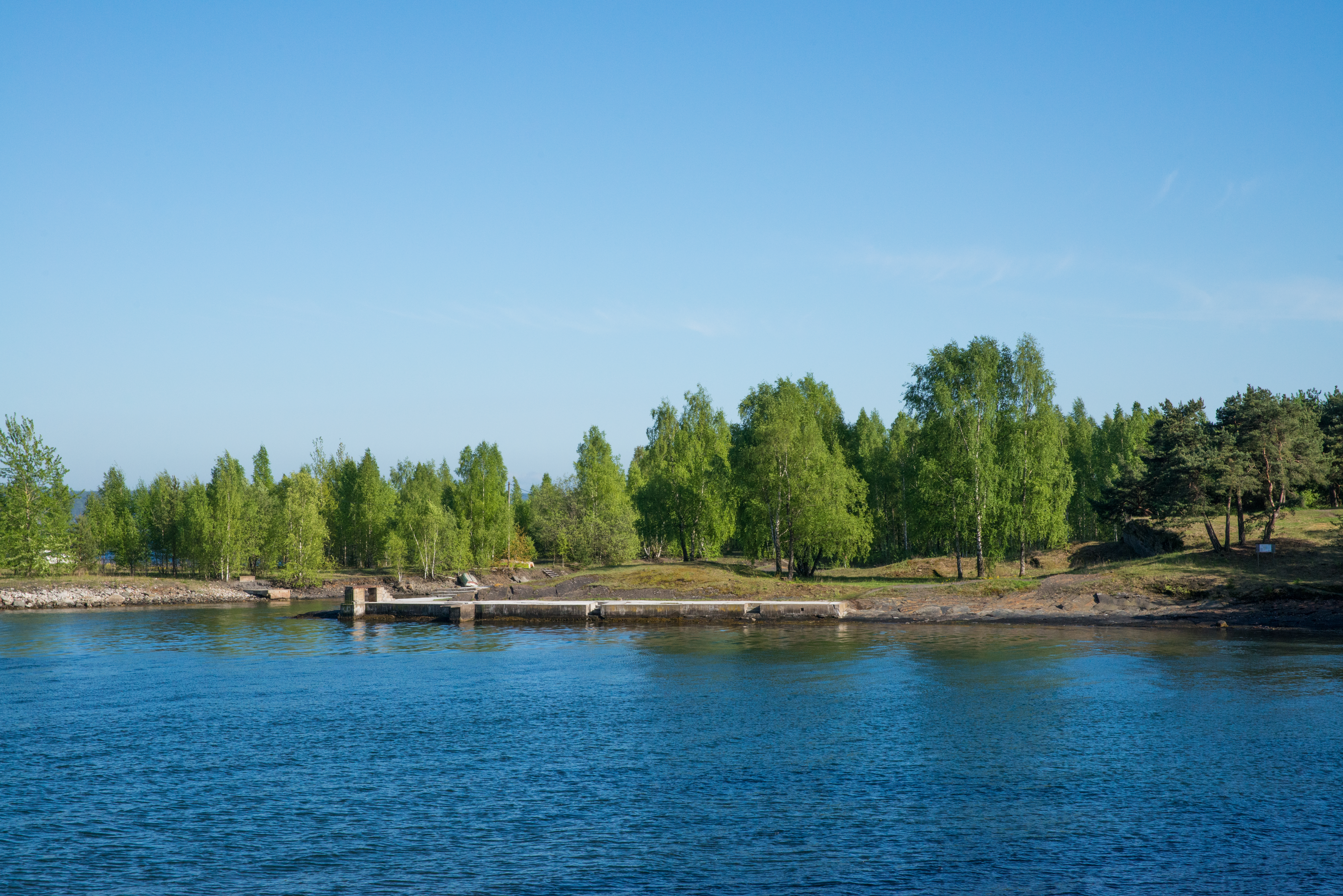
Kutangen protected nature area, Slemmestad
