= Bury Hill =

Iron Age hillfort in Hampshire, England

Coordinates: 51.190015°N 1.506822°W

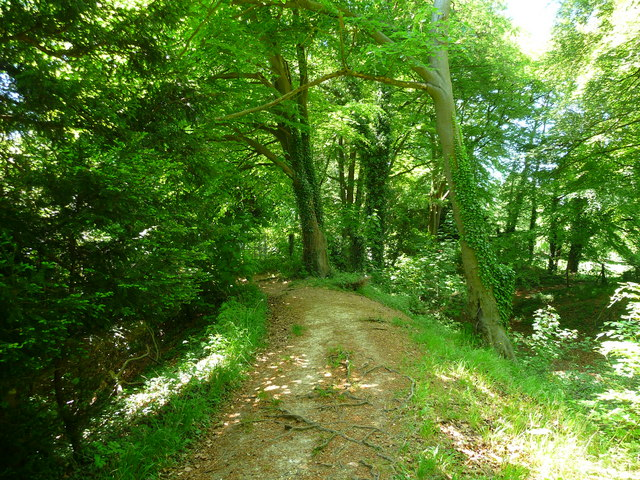
Part of the footpath that circles Bury Hill fort

Bury Hill is the site of a former Iron Age hillfort about 1.5 miles (2.4 km) southwest of the centre of Andover, Hampshire. The site encloses about 22 acres (8.9 ha). There are evident two stages to the construction of the fort: the first is a low single rampart and ditch, to the north and west of the second, stronger double rampart and ditch earthworks, part of which overlies the earlier work. The banks and the ditch are apparently in good condition, although fairly heavily wooded. A footpath encircles the hillfort on the inner rampart, accessible from the northeast and southwest. The centre is left to grass and very secluded, but is not accessible to the general public. The site was used well into the Roman era and was used as a camp by King Cnut in 1016, when he fought Edmund Ironside in the Battle of Andover; however, recent research into this battle suggests that it took place somewhere in Essex, rather than in Andover.

The site has been designated as a scheduled monument since 1925.

== Location ==
The site is south of the Pillhill Brook and Anna Valley, west of the village of Upper Clatford and west of the River Anton. To the south is open farmland. The hill summit is 100 metres (330 ft) above Ordnance Datum.

- Map sources for Bury Hill
