= Redbridge, Southampton =

Area of Southampton, England

Coordinates: 50.91977°N 1.47358°W

Redbridge
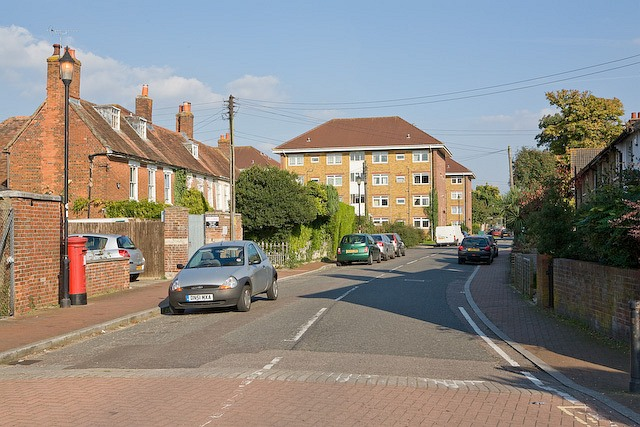

- Location within Southampton
- Population: 14,432
- Unitary authority: Southampton
- Ceremonial county: Hampshire
- Region: South East
- Country: England
- Sovereign state: United Kingdom
- Post town: SOUTHAMPTON
- Postcode district: SO15, SO16
- Dialling code: 023
- Police: Hampshire and Isle of Wight
- Fire: Hampshire and Isle of Wight
- Ambulance: South Central
- UK Parliament: Southampton Test

Redbridge is a ward with a population of 14,432, 3.1 miles (5.0 km) to the west of the city centre of Southampton, England. The area is positioned at the mouth of the River Test and is the southern terminus of the former Andover Canal and Sprat and Winkle railway line, and the modern M271 motorway.

Because of its strategic position, the area became a substantial trading post and shipbuilding centre, with many merchant and Royal Navy vessels being constructed in Redbridge in the 18th and 19th centuries.

Today, the area is mainly residential and industrial, with a large council estate and a tower block situated within the ward and Southampton Docks close by. The A35 road crosses the River Test at Redbridge, as does the South West Main Line railway. It has a small railway station.

== Etymology ==
Redbridge has been known by several names, all derived from its position as a crossing point over the River Test – originally as a ford and later with the bridge that gives the area its current name. Other than the type of crossing, the meaning of the name has not changed significantly, with the first syllable meaning "reed". Previous names and spellings include:

Name	Year
hreutford	730
hreodford	890
hreod brycge	956-10
hreod bricge	1045-11
Rodbrige	1086
Redbrigge	1222
Rudbrigge	1276

== History ==
Much of Redbridge's history is linked to its position at the tidal part of the River Test and, later, as the terminus of the Andover Canal. The first bridge was constructed in Medieval times Just north of the ford located 1/2-mile up river from the Pack and Pass 5 Arch Bridge, The five arches was constructed in the early 1700s and was paid for by the merchants of Redbridge.

The settlement was mentioned in the Domesday Book of 1086 as Rodbrige, within the Manebrige (possibly Mansbridge) Hundred in Hantscire (Hampshire). In 1575 and 1607, it was shown on maps as a small hamlet, although in the latter it was shown as being within the "Redbridg Hundred".

In 1610 William Camden described the village and its history to date thus:

Thence glideeth this water streight into Anton Haven, at Arundinis Vadum, as Bede called it and interpreteth it himselfe Reedeford: but now of the bridge where the foord was named, for Redeford, Redbridge: where, at the first springing up of the English Saxon Church, there flourished a Monasterie, the Abbat whereof Cymbreth as Beda writeth, baptised the two brethren being very little ones of Arvandus the pety King of Wight, even as they were ready to be put to death.

This indicates that a monastery and a church were already established in the hamlet of Redbridge. The location of the monastery is unknown but some accounts suggest it was located in what is now Eling or Nursling rather than the area known today as Redbridge. Redbridge again appeared on maps in 1611 and 1645 as a small hamlet within the Redbridge Hundred. The earliest parts of The Ship Inn date from either the 16th or 17th century (the buildings on either end), joined by an 18th-century building with bay windows. A further map in 1695 shows the hamlet as being within the Waltham hundred.

The settlement was never a market town, but gained considerable status as a shipbuilding centre, for both merchant shipping and the Royal Navy. It was recorded in 1724 and again in 1738 that, along with Bursledon on the other side of Southampton, King William III's Navy built ships at Redbridge "besides [an] abundance of large merchant ships".

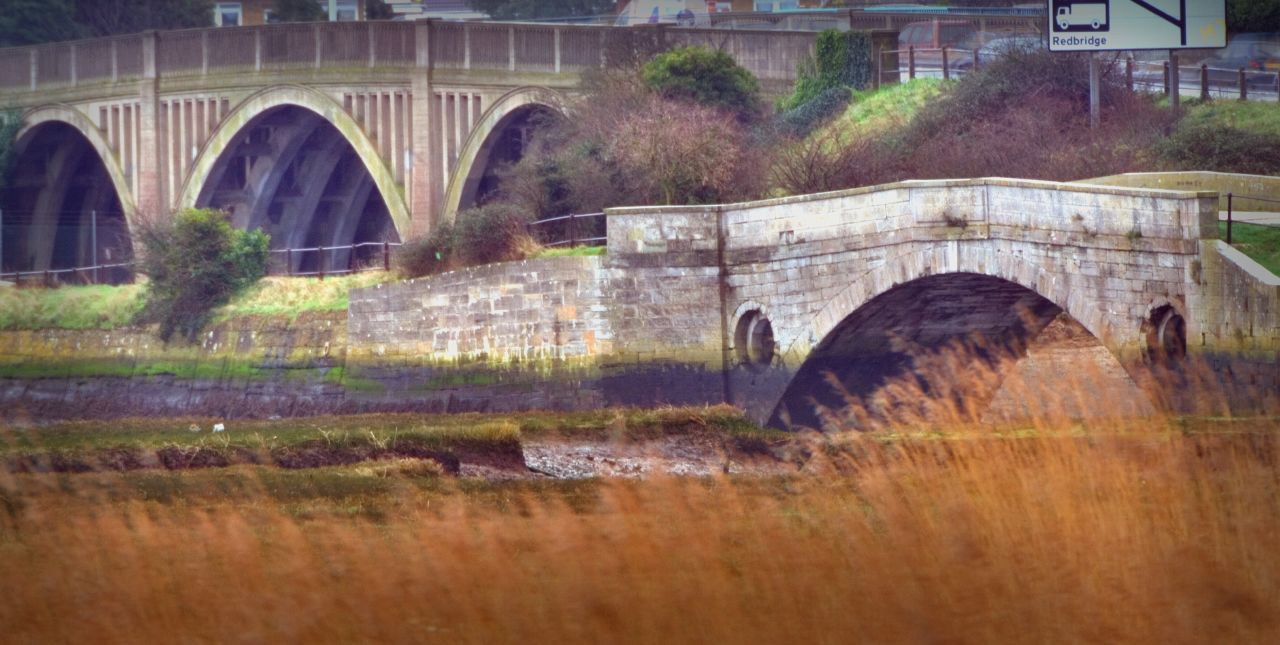
The 1793 bridge (in the foreground) with the newer road bridge behind

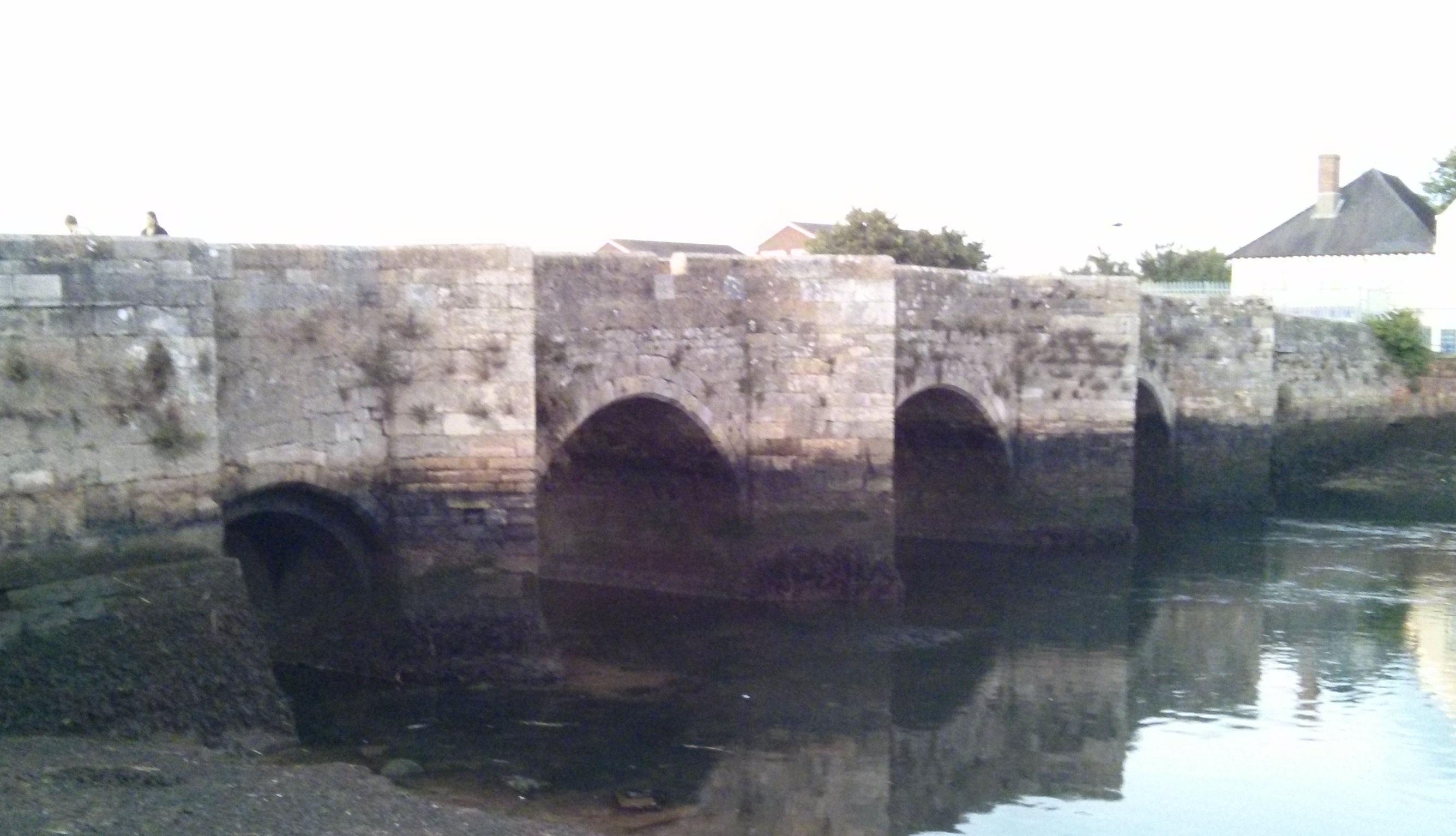
Redbridge Bridge – The old causeway from the south side at low tide.

Redbridge was again shown as a small hamlet on a 1788 map, back within a hundred named after Redbridge itself, although this time recorded as "Bedbridge Hundred". In 1793, a second, single-span bridge was constructed at Redbridge, paid for by the county council, allowing boats to pass through from Southampton Water to the Andover Canal, which opened the following year.

By 1815 Redbridge was well established as a village, albeit within the parish of Millbrook. Located on the tidal estuary of the River Test, and acting as the terminus of the Andover Canal, the village was a considerable trading post for commodities such as coal, timber and corn, as well as a centre for ship building.

Work began on converting the Andover Canal to a railway, which was to become known as the Sprat and Winkle Line, in 1859. The line opened in 1865, with a new course being laid twenty years later. This meant that a level-crossing was installed in front of the Anchor public house so that carts and later motor cars could cross the railway line. In 1930 the bypass and bridge were completed which took 4 years at a cost of £100.000. Another carriageway was added to the 'flyover' over the River Test parallel to the main line railway in the 1970s.

The M271 motorway was opened in 1975; the motorway terminates at the Redbridge Roundabout, where it meets the dual carriageway A35 trunk road. It is these transport structures, together with industrial and high density residential developments, that dominate Redbridge today.

== Governance ==
Southampton Test constituency shown within Hampshire

Falling within the boundaries of the City of Southampton, which is a unitary authority, there is only one tier of local government covering Redbridge. Three of the 48 councillors on Southampton City Council are elected for the Redbridge ward. As at June 2015, one of Redbridge's councillors is an Independent (Andrew Pope) and two (Catherine McEwing and Lee Whitbread) represent the Labour Party.

On a national level Redbridge is part of the Southampton Test parliamentary constituency. This seat is currently held by Alan Whitehead, also of the Labour Party. Prior to Brexit in 2020, it was represented by the South East England constituency for the European Union parliament.

== Demography ==
Demographics at a glance
2001 census	Redbridge Ward	Southampton	England
Total population	14,432	217,445	49,138,831
Christian	69.9%	65.6%	71.7%
Muslim	0.6%	1.9%	3.1%
Hindu	0.2%	0.7%	1.1%
Sikh	0.2%	1.3%	0.7%
No religion	19.7%	21.6%	14.6%

At the 2001 census, Redbridge ward had a population of 14,432, and a population density of 36.03 persons per hectare.

== Transport ==
Redbridge is served by Redbridge railway station which offers hourly services into Southampton City Centre, Eastleigh, Romsey, Salisbury and Chandlers Ford. The area is also served by a number of bus routes, predominately Bluestar. The area is easily accessible by car with M271 motorway and A35 road both running through Redbridge.

== Education ==
Schools in the area include Redbridge Primary School in Redbridge Road, which has a capacity of 803. and Redbridge Community School which is a specialist sports college in Cuckmere Lane with a capacity of 1,050,

== Redbridge Wharf Park ==
Redbridge Wharf Park (grid reference SU371135) is a park overlooking the tidal reaches of the River Test. It was formerly an area of railway sidings. It consists of grassy areas, areas of bushes and a pathway which leads to a riverside walk. There is only one access point – across a footbridge from Redbridge railway station.

== MP3 Project ==
A sports pavilion and community centre was opened in Mansel Park on 18 March 2008. The Mansel Park Pavilion (MP3) project was funded by direct government grant (via SEEDA and Sport England) with additional funding provided by the City Council. The new pavilion houses the Golden Ring Boxing Club, Hampshire & Isle of Wight Youth Options, and Millbrook Towers & District Community Association. The three groups worked closely with the city council and local residents to develop the proposals and secure funding. Together they formed the Mansel Park Pavilion project group to champion the project, overseeing its development from drawing board to completion, and the future management of the facility. The building is now managed by Hampshire Youth Options.
