= Currall =

Currall is a surname. Notable people with the surname include:

- Alan Currall (born 1964), British artist
- Eliza Currall (1855–1927), English watercress grower and entrepreneur
- Steven C. Currall, American psychological scientist and academic administrator

== See also ==
- Coral, a type of marine life
