= Eliza James =

English watercress grower and entrepreneur

- Born: Eliza Currall; 30 September 1855; Birmingham, England
- Died: 26 September 1927 (aged 71); London
- Resting place: West Norwood Cemetery
- Other names: Eliza Griffiths; Eliza Fleet
- Occupations: Watercress seller and entrepreneur
- Spouse(s): William Arthur Griffiths (1877–1897); James Fleet (1902–1913)

Eliza James (30 September 1855 – 26 September 1927) was an English watercress grower and entrepreneur, known as the Watercress Queen of Covent Garden. Her watercress business was the largest watercress company of the time in Europe.

== Life ==
She was born Eliza Currall, in Birmingham, England, on 30 September 1855. She began selling watercress to help support her family following the suicide of her father. At the age of 16, she was under detention as a female juvenile offender at the Warwickshire Reformatory for Girls in Coventry, which taught offenders a trade. Around 1877, she moved to London.

On 28 May 1877 she married William Arthur Griffiths, a mariner, in Liverpool and they had four daughters and three sons. They lived in Coventry, Birmingham and Liverpool before settling in Sheffield as fruit and vegetable sellers. By 1886, she owned a fruit and commission agency business at Castlefolds Market in Sheffield.

Her husband was an alcoholic, and on three occasions stabbed her. He threatened to murder her when she attempted to take divorce proceedings against him, and he was imprisoned in 1897. She was granted a divorce by decree nisi in April of that year, while William was in Wakefield gaol. In her divorce petition, she argued that from the start of her marriage she had maintained her children with her own resources. It was rescinded on the basis of adultery, as she had lived with another man, James Fleet, a meat salesman at Sheffield market, in Glasgow after the divorce nisi, which she mistakenly believed had legally ended her marriage. She married Fleet in 1902, describing herself as a widow, and the couple lived in London and were sellers at Covent Garden market.

In 1912 she visited the United States of America with her daughter, travelling out on the ocean liner Carmania and returning on the Lusitania.

=== Watercress business ===
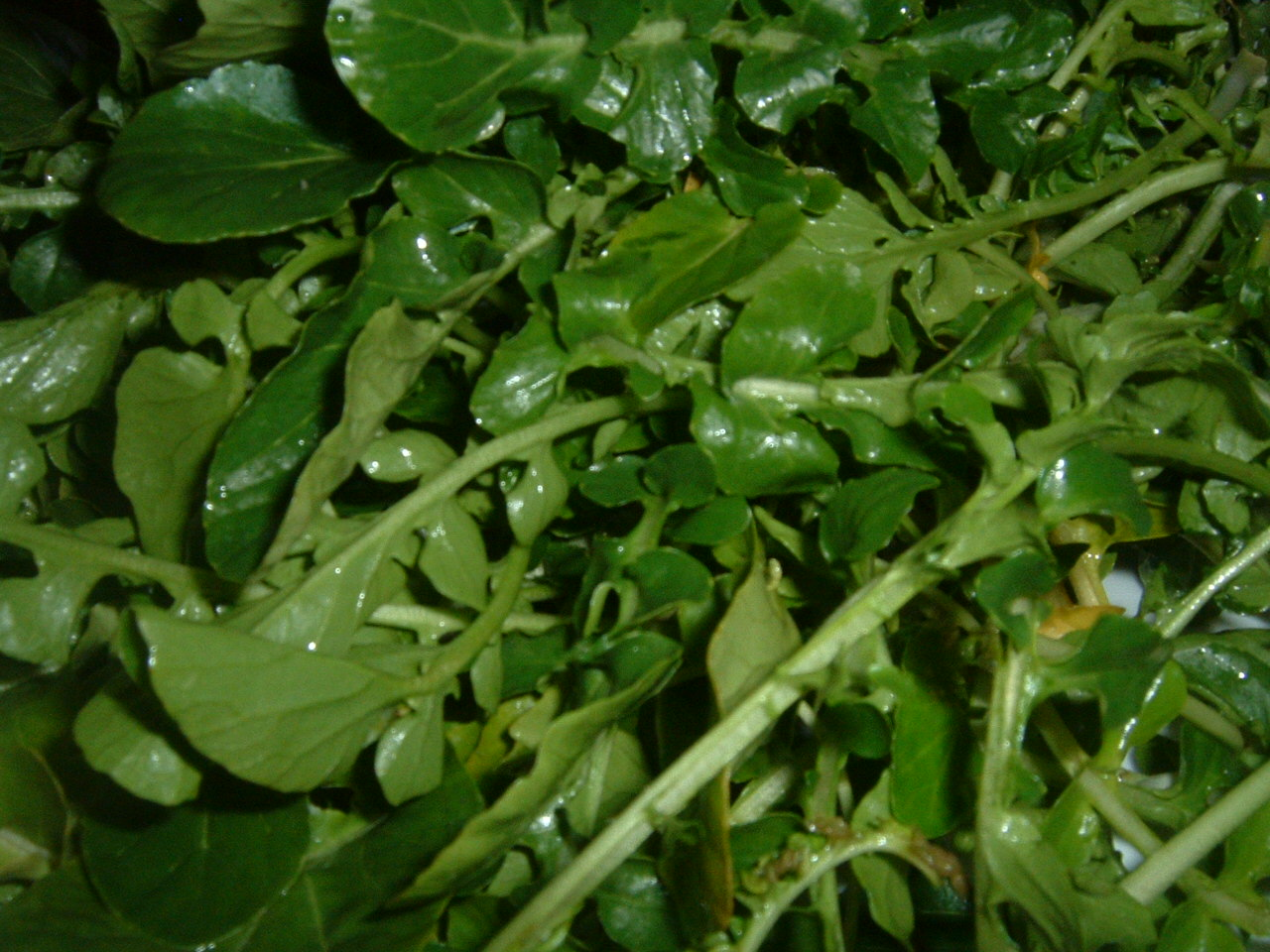
Watercress (Nasturtium officinale)

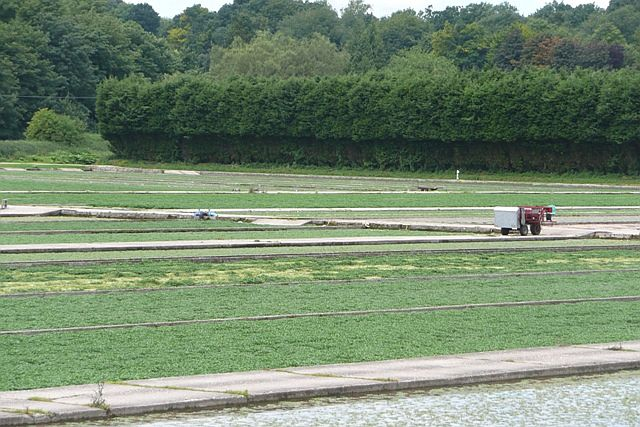
Vitacress watercress beds in St Mary Bourne

Because of her success as an entrepreneur and grower, she was known as the Watercress Queen. She was a successful businesswoman in a male-dominated environment, and in 1908 was trading in her own right as a saleswoman of watercress and salad. She diversified her trade, and began supplying, in addition to markets, restaurants, hotels and shops, and gained an almost monopoly of London's watercress market.

She founded her company James & Son and from 1908 invested in watercress beds in Hampshire and Surrey, in Hurstbourne Priors and St Mary Bourne on the Bourne rivulet. She leased six acres of watercress beds from the Earl of Portsmouth in 1908, and again in 1917, this time a further nine acres. Her business suffered from the extensive drought of 1921, for which she had to sink artesian wells for irrigation.

Her firm was the largest watercress company in Europe, and she became among the largest owners of watercress sites in the world. Despite her success as a businesswoman, James continued to work on her stall at Covent Garden Market, opening each morning having arrived on her son-in-law's watercress cart.

== Death and legacy ==
She died on 26 September 1927 from a brain haemorrhage, arteriosclerosis, and chronic Bright's disease. She was buried at West Norwood Cemetery in London, where her coffin was laid with a large wreath of watercress.

By the end of her life, James was supplying London's restaurant trade, selling 50 tonnes of watercress a week. The fields of watercress beds she created in Hampshire are still used for watercress production, and are now owned by Vitacress Salads.
