= Taskers of Andover =

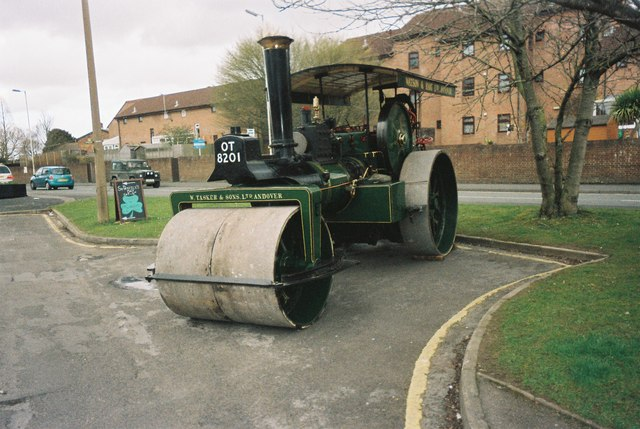
- Steamroller by Taskers
- Industry: Metal works and Engineering
- Founded: 1813; 212 years ago in: Upper Clatford; Andover, Hampshire
- Founders: Thomas Tasker, William Tasker, George Fowle
- Defunct: 1990s
- Fate: Wound up
- Headquarters: Andover, England
- Key people: Henry Tasker
- Products: Steam road locomotives; Road trailers

Taskers of Andover were an Andover, Hampshire based metal works and engineering company, which became better known in the latter half of the 20th century for their lorry trailers. After 170 years in operation, the company became first part of the John Brown company, and then sold to Montracon, after which it closed.

== Background ==
In 1806, Robert Tasker of Stanton St Bernard, Wiltshire travelled from his father's blacksmith business to Abbotts Ann, Hampshire to join the forge ironworks business of Thomas Maslen. In 1809, he took over the business, but due to his non conformist Christian views, Tasker found business hard, and was forced to bid for work from further afield.

== Waterloo ironworks ==
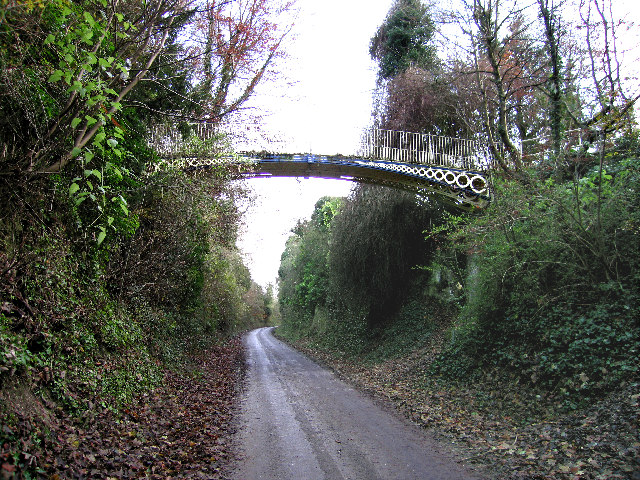
Cast Iron Footbridge over Micheldever Road, Andover. Built 1851 by Tasker and Fowle to carry Ladies Walk footpath over Micheldever Road

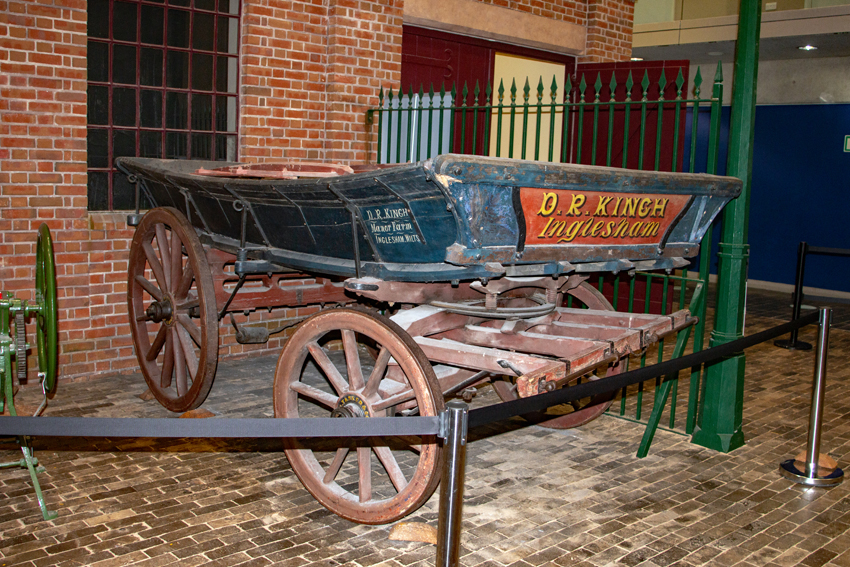
Wiltshire farm wagon with ironwork by Taskers

In 1813, Tasker and his brother William founded the Waterloo Ironworks in the Anna Valley. The site, built on chalk strata, gave access to coal and iron ore via the Andover Canal, and offered waterwheel power from the Pillhill Brook. The works came into operation in 1815, hence it is named after the great Battle of Waterloo. The brothers entered into a partnership with George Fowle, a relative of Robert's wife, Martha.

=== The Swing riots ===
As the industrial revolution gathered pace, a series of riots began. Started in Kent by a Captain Swing, a group of 300 agricultural workers entered the works 20 November 1830, causing considerable damage. 30 men were arrested by Special constables, of which 14 were tried, 4 acquitted, and 10 eventually transported to penal colonies in Australia.

=== William's sons take over ===
After the opening of the London and Southampton Railway, the canal was closed, and eventually buried to make way for another railway line, which hence replaced Taskers wharf with a series of private railway sidings. In 1857, two of William's sons took over the business, coming to a licence agreement with Clayton & Shuttleworth of Lincoln to sell and service their stationary boilers.

=== Steam engines ===
In 1865, the Waterloo Ironworks made its first steam engine, and until 1891 Taskers became known as a producer of bespoke steam engines, each one of which was produced to its own unique design. After William's third son Henry joined the firm, he implemented the "Economic" design of 8 horsepower (6.0 kW) engines of 1891, which formed the first series of standard Tasker designs, using steel boiler plates over wrought iron.

== Tasker & Sons ==
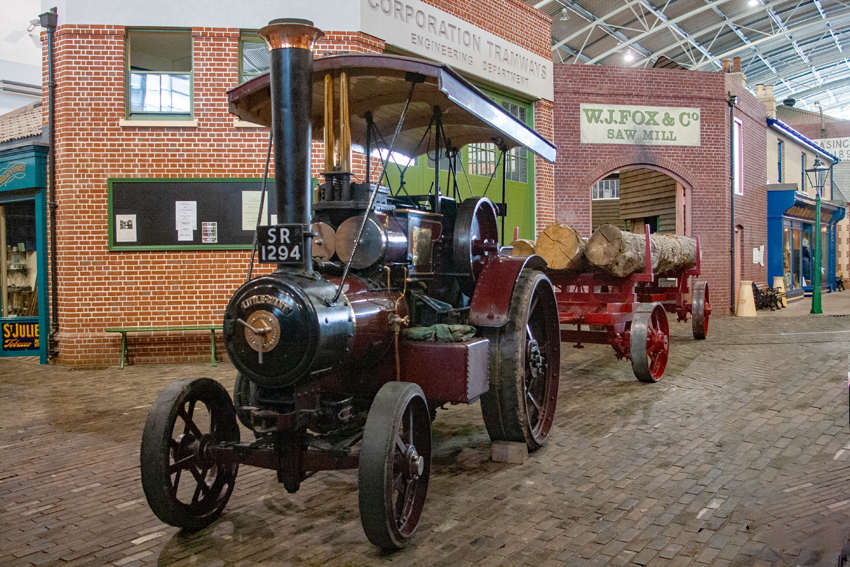
Tasker's Little Giant

Henry, who was now running the business, bought out his brothers interests, but the company was now left short of capital, and hence struggled through to World War I. Henry found new capital via a series of share sales, which resulted in the 1902 development of the standard class of 'light', just under 3 long tons or 3.05 tonnes, engine called "Little Giant," of which over 300 were made.

After liquidation in 1903, and reformation in 1907, Taskers production thrived in World War I. Post-war, Taskers built a series of road rollers, but the economic slump brought about a second, inevitable receivership in 1926 and a further liquidation. The last steam engine, a C Class road roller, left the factory in 1927.

== Taskers of Andover (1932) Limited ==
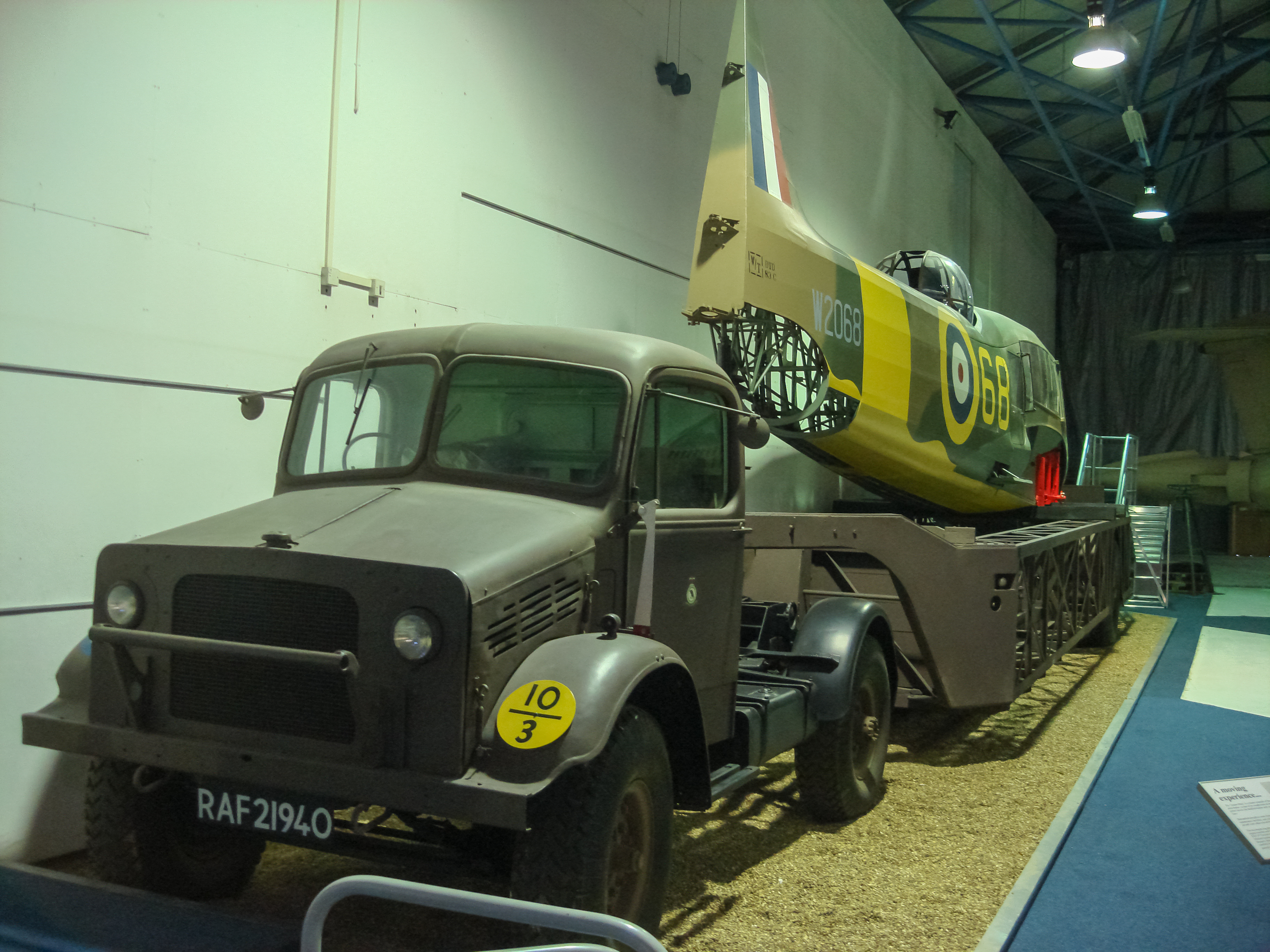
"Queen Mary" semi-trailer carrying part of an Avro Anson aircraft at the RAF Museum London

In 1932, the company was revived, as Taskers of Andover (1932) Limited, through the production of semi-trailers. Using steel rather than iron, the product didn't require the services of the Waterloo Ironworks, which closed permanently in 1937.

In 1938 the Air Ministry, which was forming plans for setting up the Civilian Repair Organisation, sent out a tender for a recovery trailer able to carry an entire fighter aircraft. Ten days later Taskers arrived in Whitehall, not only with a written and costed proposal, but also with a prototype trailer. Subsequently nicknamed the Queen Mary trailer after Cunard's RMS Queen Mary, both being the largest of their type. The company gained 300 orders in the buildup to World War II. By the end of the war nearly 4000 had been delivered.

== Tasker Trailers ==
Adopting the post-war name of Tasker Trailers to supply the developing road transport industry, the company had branches in Wigan and Scotland. Taken over by Craven Industries, which later itself became part of the John Brown and Co engineering conglomerate, The company manufactured heavy duty low loaders and hydraulic modular trailers under a licensed agreement with Delattre-Levivier an engineering company these trailers were also exported to developing markets like Ghana, Nigeria, Middle East and West Africa. It was sold as part of a package of assets in 1983 to Montracon of Belfast, Northern Ireland. After the closure of the works and demolition of the residual buildings in 1984, Montracon decided to consolidate its brands, resulting in the end of the Tasker brand in the late 1990s.

== Preservation ==
In 1948, Arthur Fuller, the then managing director, decided to preserve items manufactured by the company over its existence, leading to the acquisition of 108 items which were displayed in a museum under the main offices. The collection included 23 steam road engines and a Queen Mary trailer complete with Spitfire, along with many items of agricultural machinery and tools from the Anna Valley works. With the sale of the company in 1968, the collection was put up for sale and the majority acquired by the Hampshire County Council Museums Service.

Several preserved Tasker vehicles are displayed at the Milestones Museum in Basingstoke, Hampshire. A B2 roller in the collection of the Claude Jessett Trust is the oldest Taskers roller in preservation.
