= Stoke, Basingstoke and Deane =

Village in Hampshire, England

Coordinates: 51.2646°N 1.4238°W

Stoke
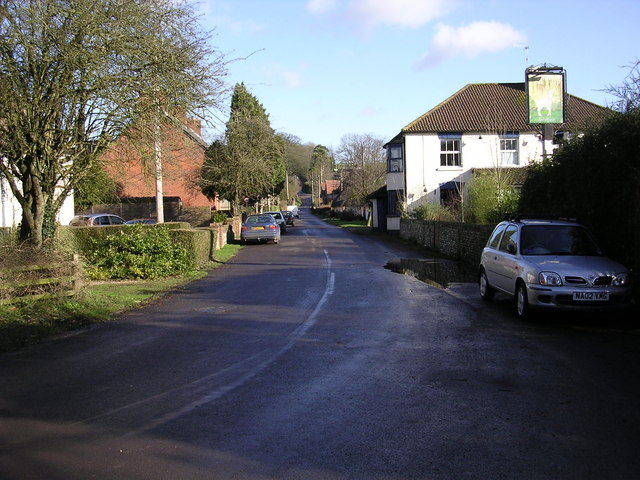
- Minor road through Stoke

- Location within Hampshire
- OS grid reference: SU7185402751
- Civil parish: St Mary Bourne
- District: Basingstoke and Deane
- Shire county: Hampshire
- Region: South East
- Country: England
- Sovereign state: United Kingdom
- Post town: ANDOVER
- Postcode district: SP11
- Dialling code: 01264
- Police: Hampshire and Isle of Wight
- Fire: Hampshire and Isle of Wight
- Ambulance: South Central
- UK Parliament: North West Hampshire

Stoke is a small village in northwest Hampshire. At the 2011 Census the population of the village was included in the civil parish of St Mary Bourne. It lies in the valley of the Bourne Rivulet, a tributary of the River Test 5 miles (8.0 km) northeast of the town of Andover.

== History ==
The 1894 OS map indicates Stoke was a very small village, perhaps qualifying as a hamlet. Two farms are listed: Hopgoods and Summerbee. Additionally, there is a Methodist chapel, the "White Hart" public house and a moderate number of further dwellings, The White Hart pub remains extant, however the days it is open are significantly limited. Arguably, it should be considered a private house, that is occasionally used as a service venue. There are eight grade two listed buildings in Stoke, although the number of historic houses is far greater. As with many villages in the area, there are a large number of thatched houses in the vernacular style.

== Governance ==
The village is part of the civil parish of St Mary Bourne and is part of the Burghclere, Highclere and St. Mary Bourne ward of Basingstoke and Deane borough council. The borough council is a Non-metropolitan district of Hampshire County Council.
