= Bourne Rivulet =

River in Hampshire, England

Coordinates: 51°12′36″N 1°21′38″W

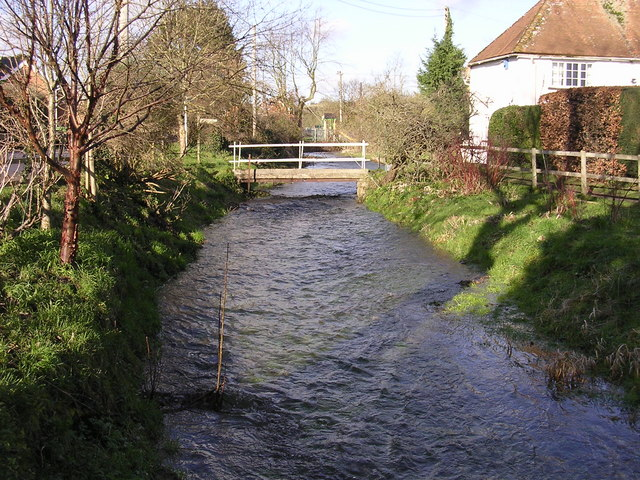
Bourne Rivulet at Stoke

The Bourne Rivulet is a river in the English county of Hampshire. It is a tributary of the River Test.

The Bourne Rivulet (known as 'The Bourne' locally) is a winterbourne (a seasonal chalk stream that rises and falls with the water table). It usually rises in January and flows until around August each year. It normally runs from the village of Upton and flows through the villages of Hurstbourne Tarrant, St Mary Bourne and Hurstbourne Priors before joining with the Test near Tufton.

Above Hurstbourne Tarrant it is known as the Swift or River Swift.

Due to water extraction in the drainage basin, the upper flow is more intermittent than naturally. However, Vitacress Salads Ltd.'s watercress plant, which is at the perennial headwater point, maintains flow through its pumping of extracted water not needed down into the stream.

== In literature ==
The Bourne was celebrated in a much loved book by Harry Plunket Greene, "Where the Bright Waters Meet", in which he described it as "unquestionably the finest trout stream in the south of England."

Fans of this book, which chronicles the author's fishing experiences on the Bourne between 1902 and 1912, still come from all over the world to fish here.

Since 1995 the fishing has been managed and let by a private company.

== Environmental issues ==
The river still produces some large wild brown trout. In the past, there has been an unexplained subtle invertebrate imbalance (source: Environment Agency). Since 2007, Vitacress Salads Ltd. has taken measures which have reversed the imbalance (source: Environment Agency 2008), to the extent that restoration works downstream were recently winners in the Wild Trust Trust 2008 Awards.
