= St Mary Bourne =

Village and parish in Hampshire, England

Coordinates: 51.25°N 1.39°W

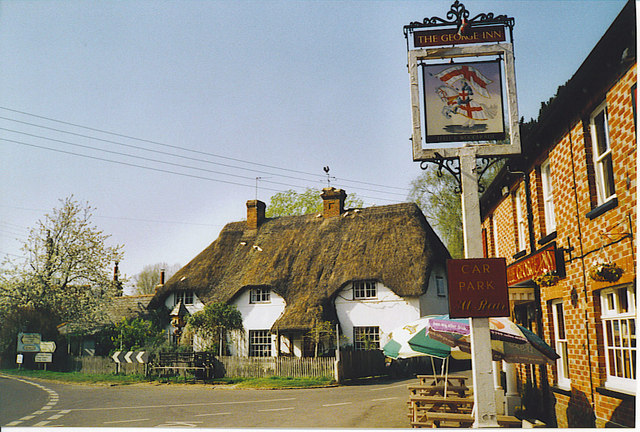
- Thatched Cottage and The George Inn

- Location within Hampshire
- Population: 1,298 (parish 2011 Census including Little Bourne, Little Down, Middle Wyke, Stoke and Wadwick)
- OS grid reference: SU422503
- Civil parish: St Mary Bourne
- District: Basingstoke and Deane
- Shire county: Hampshire
- Region: South East
- Country: England
- Sovereign state: United Kingdom
- Post town: ANDOVER
- Postcode district: SP11
- Dialling code: 01264
- Police: Hampshire and Isle of Wight
- Fire: Hampshire and Isle of Wight
- Ambulance: South Central
- UK Parliament: North West Hampshire

St Mary Bourne is a village and civil parish in the Basingstoke and Deane district of Hampshire, England. It lies on the valley of the Bourne Rivulet, a tributary of the River Test, 5 miles (8.0 km) northeast of Andover.

== Governance ==
The civil parish of St Mary Bourne is part of the Burghclere, Highclere and St Mary Bourne ward of Basingstoke and Deane borough council. The borough council is a Non-metropolitan district of Hampshire County Council. The ward includes Binley, and the hamlets of Swampton and Stoke further up the Bourne rivulet valley.

== Geography ==
The village is in a rural area of downland, with a mixture of farms and woodlands nearby. The Bourne Rivulet flows through the centre of the village and has been known to flood.

Vitacress is an agriculture company headquartered in St Mary Bourne. The business, which was founded in the 1950s by Malcolm Isaac, is Europe's largest provider of watercress and also grows and packages washed rocket, spinach and other salad greens.

== Landmarks ==
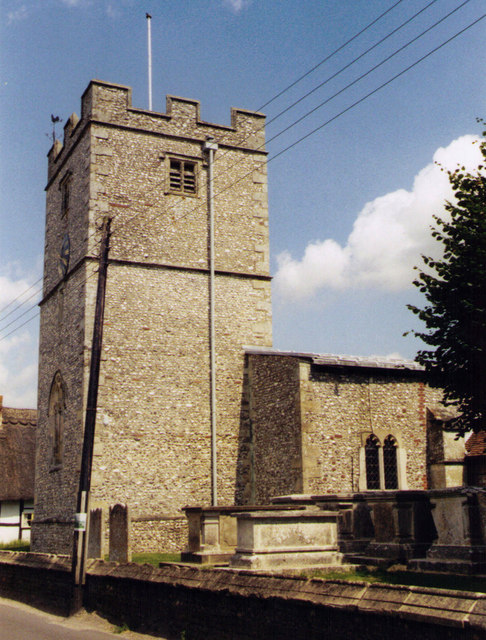
St Peter's Church

It has thatched houses and in the south part of the village is the flint and stone church of St Peter. The church is notable for its 12th-century Tournai font.
