= Tufton, Hampshire =

Village and parish in Hampshire, England

Coordinates: 51.218649°N 1.346728°W

Tufton
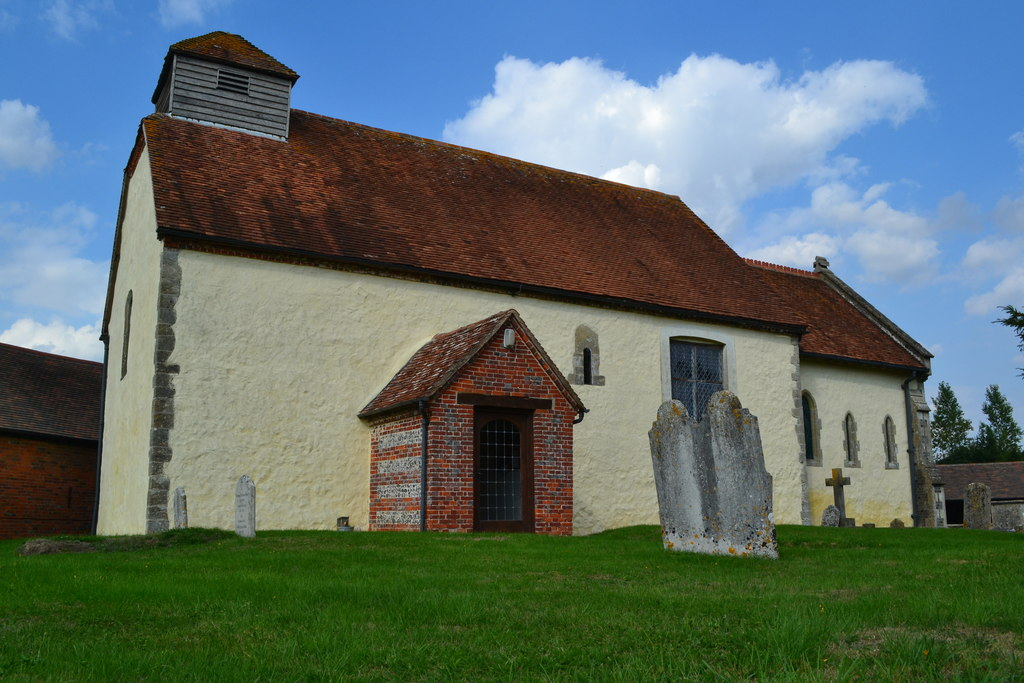
- St Mary's Church, Tufton

- Location within Hampshire
- OS grid reference: SU4572246808
- Civil parish: Hurstbourne Priors
- District: Basingstoke and Deane
- Shire county: Hampshire
- Region: South East
- Country: England
- Sovereign state: United Kingdom
- Post town: BASINGSTOKE
- Postcode district: RG25 2
- Dialling code: 01256
- Police: Hampshire and Isle of Wight
- Fire: Hampshire and Isle of Wight
- Ambulance: South Central
- UK Parliament: Basingstoke

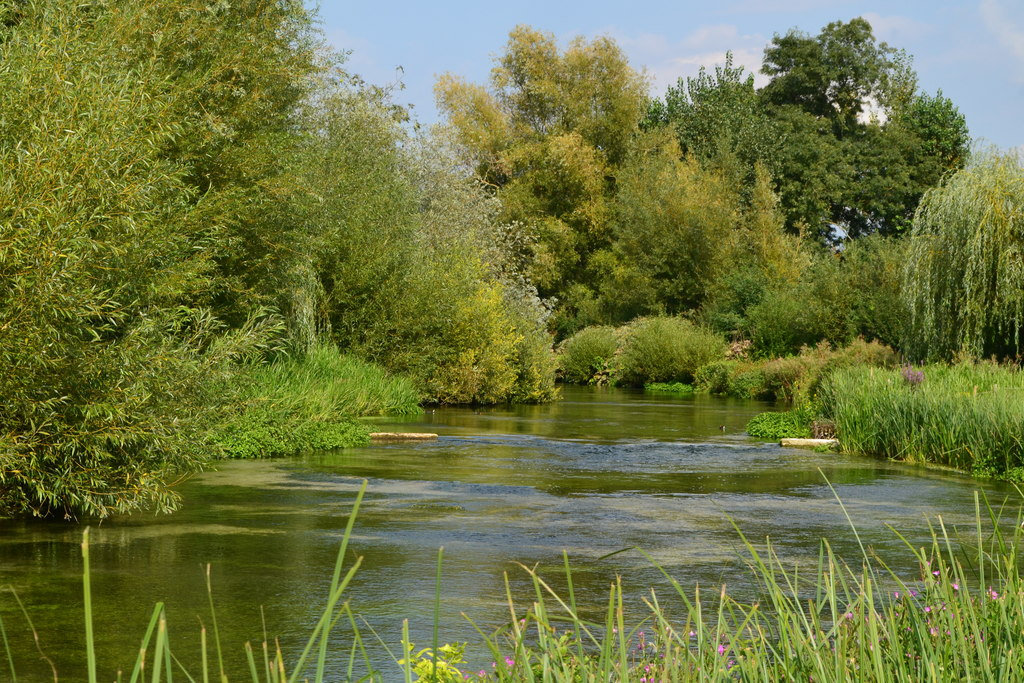
River Test at Tufton

Tufton is a small village and former civil parish, now in the parish of Hurstbourne Priors, in the Basingstoke and Deane district, in the county of Hampshire, England, on the River Test. St Mary's Church dates from the 13th century and contains a large early 15th-century painting of Saint Christopher on the north wall of nave. Its nearest town is Whitchurch, which lies approximately 1 mile north from the village. In 1931 the parish had a population of 108. On 1 April 1932 the parish was abolished and merged with Hurstbourne Priors.
