= Little Ann =

Hamlet in Hampshire, England

Coordinates: 51°11.3′N 1°31.2′W

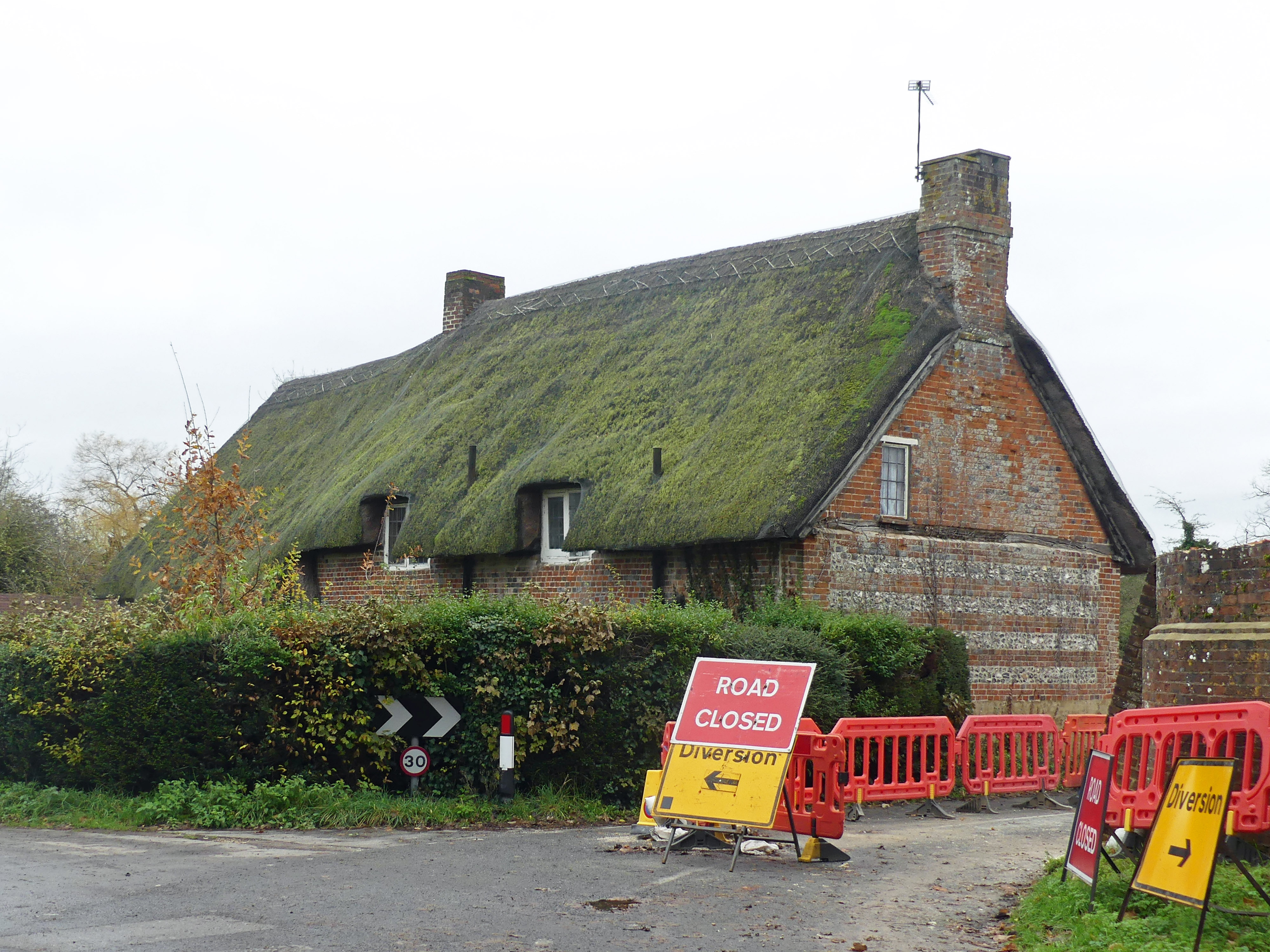
Pennymarsh, a Grade II* listed cottage in Little Ann

Little Ann is an English hamlet attached to Abbotts Ann, approximately two miles south-west of Andover in the north-west of Hampshire.

The Poplar Farm Inn in the hamlet is part of the Vintage Inns chain, a trading name of Mitchells & Butlers.

Pennymarsh is a Grade II* listed thatched cottage at the western end of the village, dating back to the 15th century.
