= Anton Lakes =

British natural area

Coordinates: 51.220°N 1.486°W

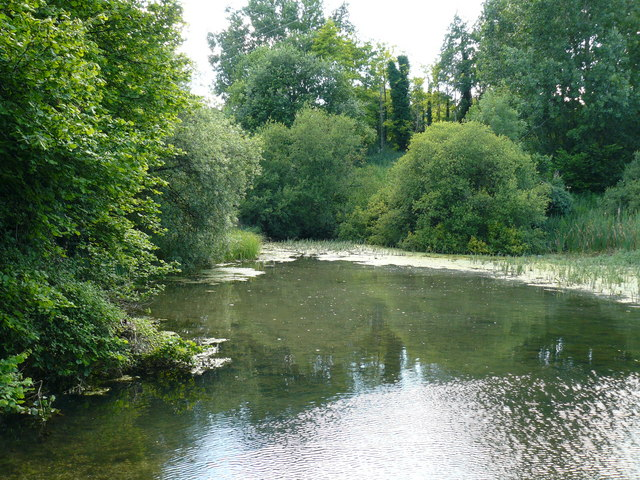
- Interactive map of Anton Lakes
- Type: Local Nature Reserve
- Location: Andover, Hampshire
- OS grid: SU 360 469
- Area: 33.1 hectares (82 acres)
- Manager: Test Valley Borough Council

Anton Lakes is a 33.1-hectare (82-acre) Local Nature Reserve in Andover in Hampshire. It is owned by Test Valley Borough Council and managed by the council together with The Anton River Conservation Association.

The River Anton rises in the site and flows through former watercress beds into the lakes, which were created by gravel extraction. Another habitat is chalk grassland, which has butterflies such as marbled white and gatekeeper. There is also an area of wet meadow, and mammals include otters and water voles.
