= Anna Valley =

Settlement in Hampshire, England

Coordinates: 51°11′36″N 1°30′01″W

- Location within Hampshire
- OS grid reference: SU347443
- District: Test Valley
- Shire county: Hampshire
- Region: South East
- Country: England
- Sovereign state: United Kingdom
- Post town: ANDOVER
- Postcode district: SP11
- Dialling code: 01264
- Police: Hampshire and Isle of Wight
- Fire: Hampshire and Isle of Wight
- Ambulance: South Central
- UK Parliament: North West Hampshire

Anna Valley is part of the village and parish of Upper Clatford, Hampshire, United Kingdom. The settlement is located approximately 1.0 mile (1.6 km) south-west of the market town of Andover.

The name 'Anna' derives from the Celtic river 'Anne' meaning 'Ash tree stream' now known as Pillhill Brook on the Ordnance Survey Landranger map, though it is still known as the River Ann to older local people.

Tasker Waterloo Ironworks (Taskers of Andover) opened here in 1815 and survived as a manufacturing industry until final closure in 1984. The site is now a modern housing development though there are still signs of Tasker's influence in the village in the form of workmen's houses, a line of terraced houses built for the workers and the former Tasker's hall which is now private housing.

Originally much of the land occupied by the later foundry at the far end of the village was marsh land, known as Clatford Marsh. Robert Tasker noted the fact that the village had quarrying rights to chalk in the nearby hillside. By exploiting this right and quarrying an acre of chalk from the hillside it enabled the marshland to be filled with the quarried materials to act as foundations for the new Iron Foundry situated alongside the PillHill brook which would serve as a source of water power for the foundry. This chalk quarry is still very much in evidence (it is owned by the Parish Council) and can be seen from the road and a footpath that passes along the hillside behind the village leading to the Iron Age hillfort of Bury Hill.

On 20 November 1830 a mob of rioters came from Andover town, they smashed a bridge in Upper Clatford that carried the road over the river Anton and proceeded to vandalise and damage fixtures and equipment at the foundry. A number of arrests were made by a detachment of local Yeomanry and the Duke of Wellington Sir Arthur Wellesley sat on the board of assizes held at Winchester jail when the ringleaders were sentenced to be hanged and a number to be transported to Australia for their crimes.

In 1843 Tasker Ironworks installed a new cast iron bridge in Upper Clatford that exists today, carrying the road over the river Anton towards Church Lane. A later iron foot bridge was installed in Andover in 1851 to carry Ladies Walk over the new Micheldever Road that was cut through the chalk hillside.

The village once had 2 public houses, one situated at the bottom of Sam Whites hill, on the road to Upper Clatford, the hill so being named for a former landlord of the pub. A second public house stood almost opposite Tasker Ironworks.

On Wednesday July 13, 1910 the British Army airship Beta was flying over Andover when the crankshaft broke. The airship landed at Little Park Farm and was later towed by Royal Engineers to the chalk pit opposite the Taskers of Andover Waterloo Ironworks. A new engine was brought from Farnborough, Hampshire and repairs assisted by the Ironworks factory. Beta remained in the chalk pit all night and most of the following day. Crowds gathered to witness this novel sight.

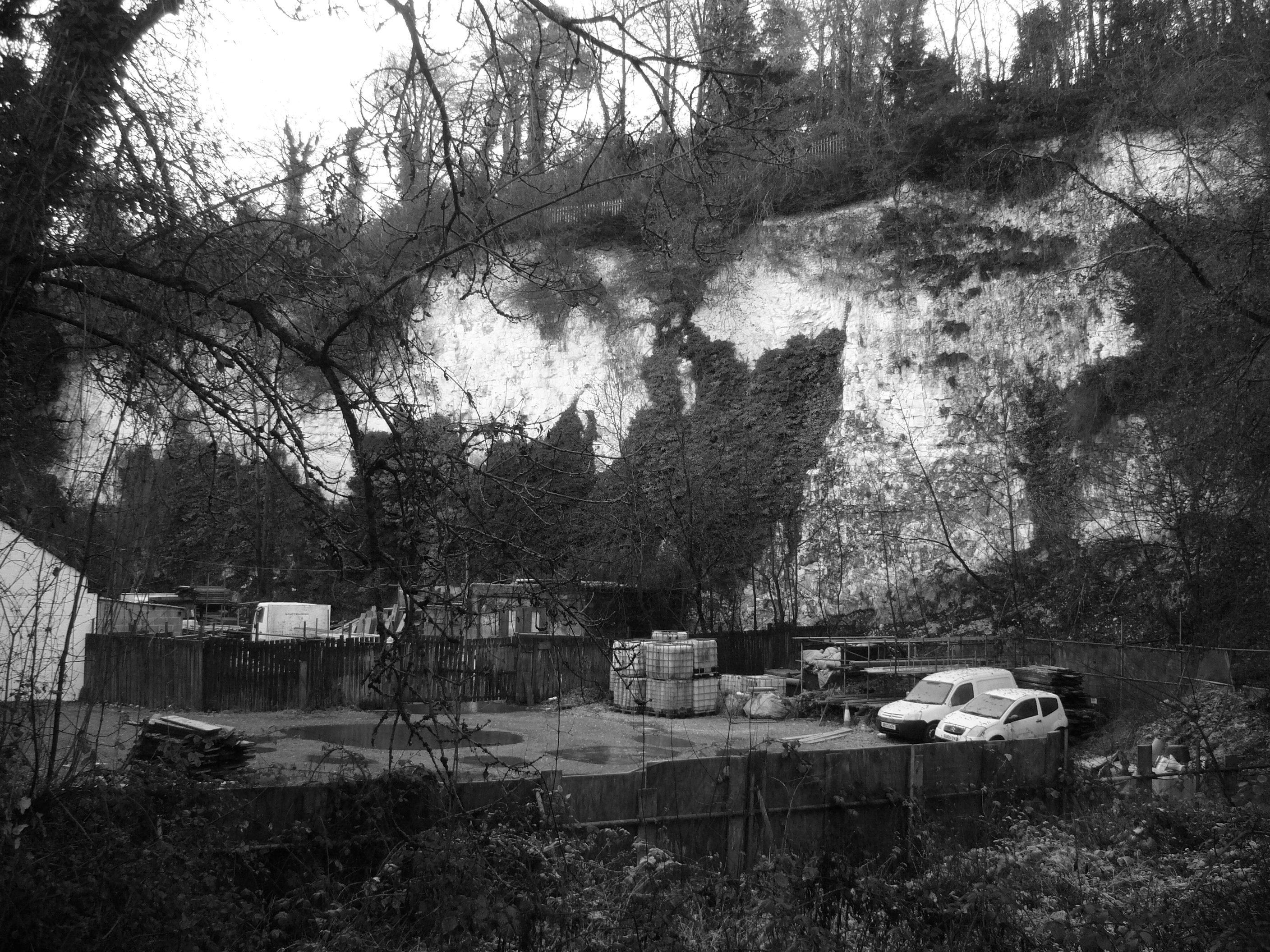
Old chalk pit just off Foundry Road, Anna Valley. This is where the Beta airship docked on the night of July 13th 1910.

The village and post office shop was demolished in December 2013, having closed a few years earlier.
