= Upper Clatford =

Village and parish in Hampshire, England

Coordinates: 51.192°N 1.494°W

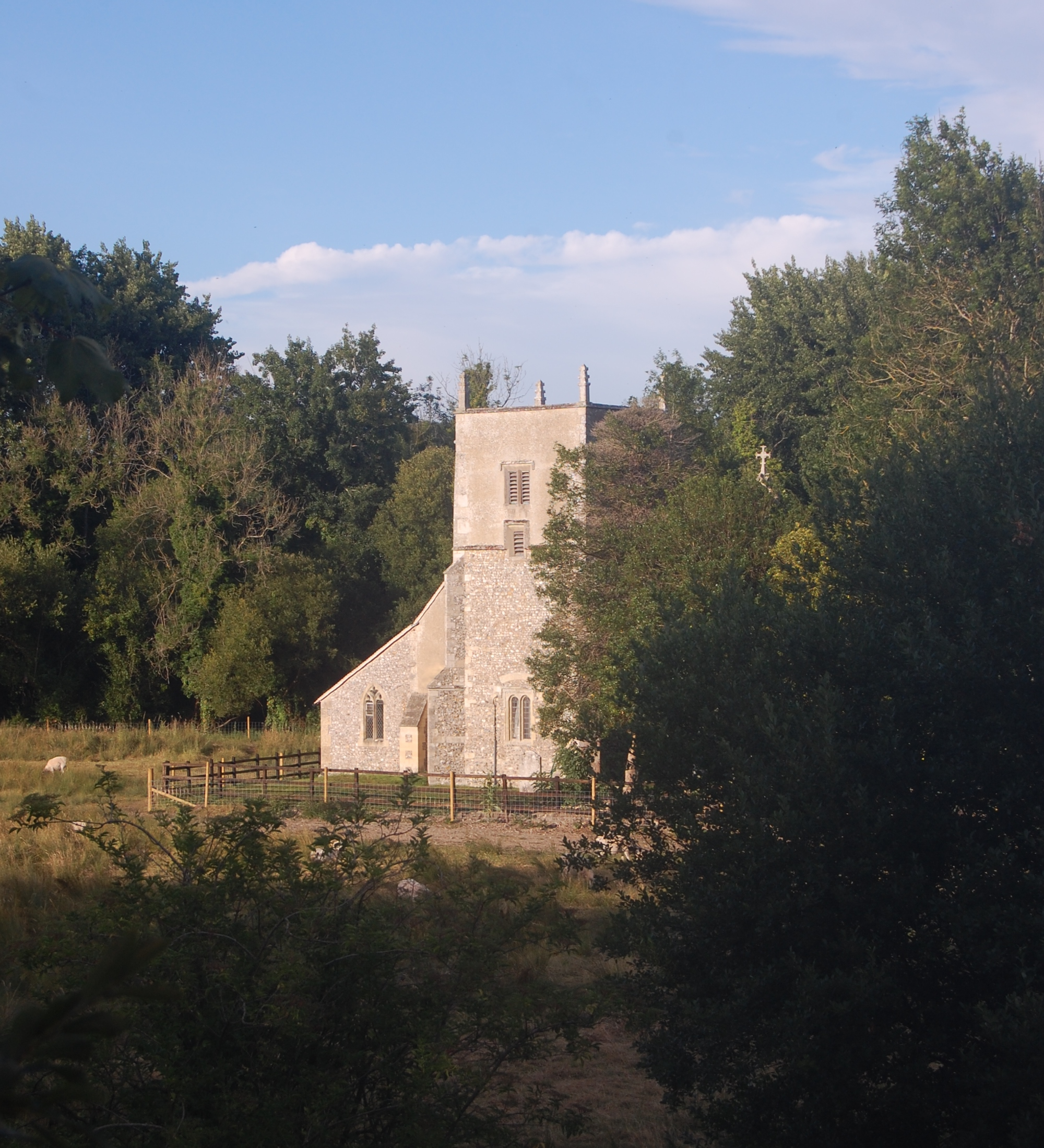
- All Saints’ Church

- Location within Hampshire
- Population: 1,652 (2011 Census including Red Rice)
- OS grid reference: SU3533643887
- District: Test Valley
- Shire county: Hampshire
- Region: South East
- Country: England
- Sovereign state: United Kingdom
- Post town: ANDOVER
- Postcode district: SP11
- Police: Hampshire and Isle of Wight
- Fire: Hampshire and Isle of Wight
- Ambulance: South Central
- UK Parliament: Romsey and Southampton North

Upper Clatford is a village and civil parish in Hampshire, England. The village is in the valley of the River Anton, 3.5 miles (5.6 km) upstream from the point where it joins the River Test at the south. Historically represented in the House of Commons by the MP for North West Hampshire, the parish was reallocated to the Romsey and Southampton North constituency by the 2023 boundary review.

Clatford is 1 mile (1.6 km) to the south from Andover town centre, the most direct route the old railway line which is now a public footpath. Along this path is evidence of the old railway line although little is seen of the earlier canal that preceded the railway. The canal and later railway were important to the local economy, in particular for the transport of raw materials from Southampton via Andover to Upper Clatford for Taskers of Andover, whose premises were in nearby Anna Valley. Pig iron was shipped from Southampton via the canal to Taskers Wharf, originally where the footpath now leaves Upper Clatford for Andover. The road south out of the village leads to the twin village of Goodworth Clatford (formerly Lower Clatford).

Clatford is an old English term meaning 'the ford where the burdock grows'. The village historically contained four manors: Norman Court, Sackville Court, Clatford Manor and Clatford Mills.

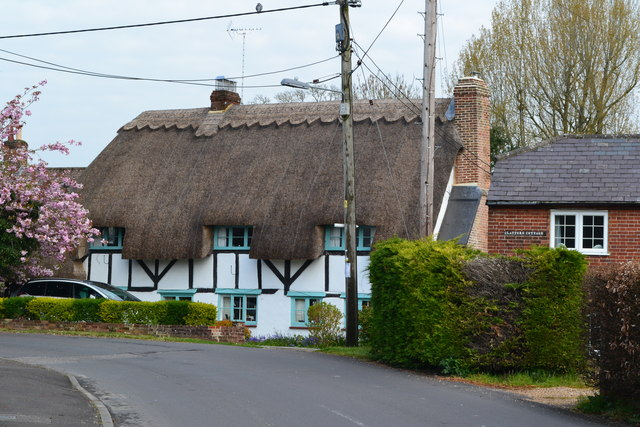
Thatched cottage in Upper Clatford

Significant buildings at Clatford include thatched cottages and houses including the local public house The Crook and Shears, and the local parish church of All Saints, which was first built probably during the reign of Henry I (1100–1135). It was rebuilt in the sixteenth century and transformed into an 'auditory church' in the seventeenth. The Church sits between two arms of the Pillhill Brook; the village war memorial is within its grounds.

== Notable people ==
Stephen Hopkins, passenger on the Mayflower and one of the signatories of the Mayflower Compact, was born and baptized at Clatford.

== See also ==
- Caldera UK Ltd. (1996–1999) at Norman Court Barns, developers of OpenDOS/DR-DOS and WebSpyder
