= Andover Canal =

Canal in Hampshire, England

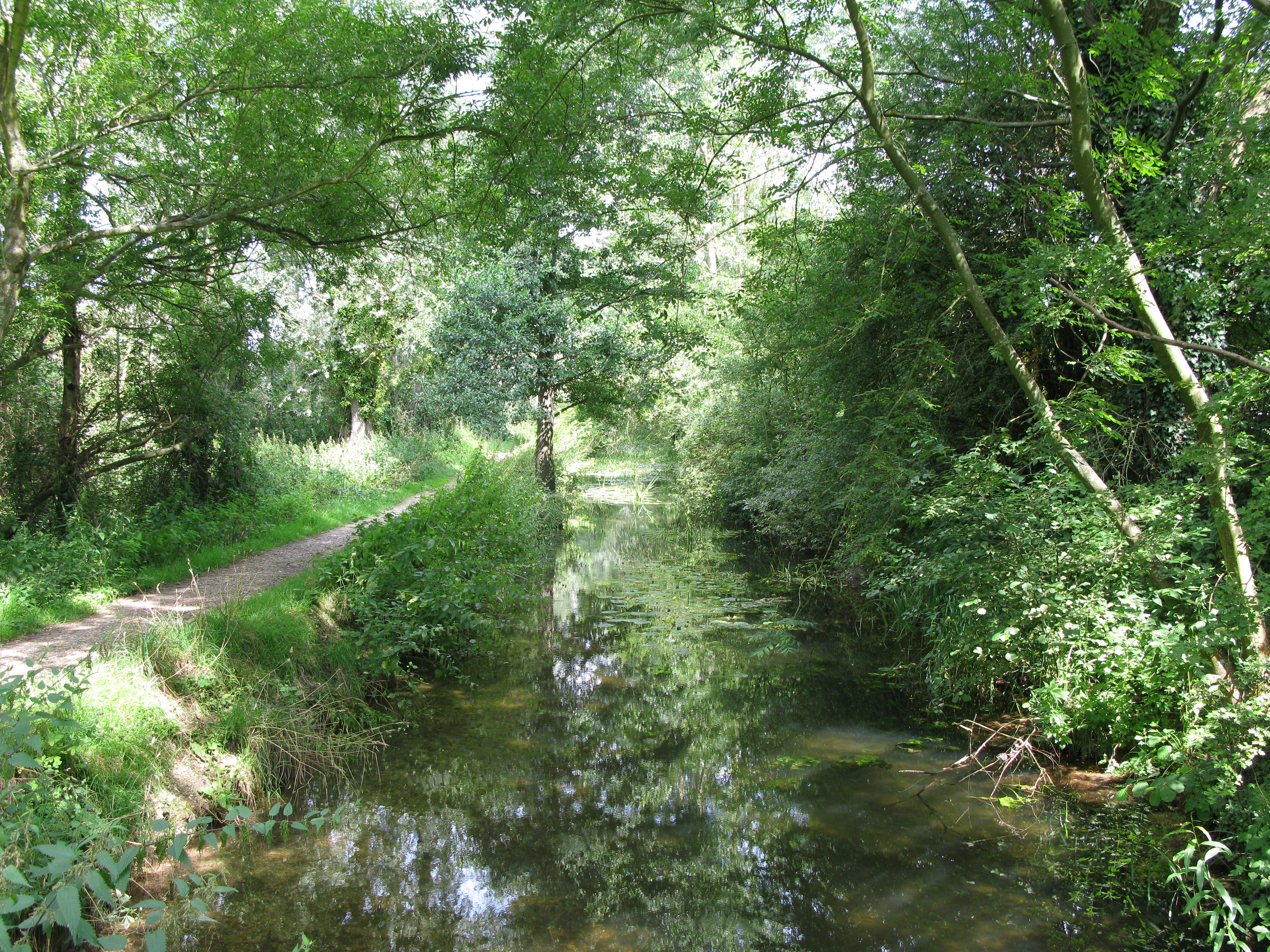
- Remains of the Andover canal near Romsey
- Interactive map of Andover Canal

Specifications
- Length: 22 miles (35 km)
- Maximum boat length: 65 ft 0 in (19.81 m)
- Maximum boat beam: 8 ft 6 in (2.59 m)
- Locks: 24 (level dropped 179 ft (55 m))
- Status: Railway built over route

History
- Former names: Andevor Canal
- Original owner: Andover Canal Navigation Company
- Principal engineer: Robert Whitworth
- Date of act: 1789
- Date of first use: 1794
- Date closed: 1859

Geography
- Start point: Andover
- End point: Southampton Water
- Connects to: Salisbury and Southampton Canal

The Andover Canal (formally, the Andevor Canal) was a canal built in Hampshire, England. It ran 22 miles (35 km) from Andover to Redbridge through Stockbridge and Romsey. The canal had a fall of 179 feet (55 m) through 24 locks, and for much of its length paralleled the River Anton and River Test. It opened in 1794, but was never a commercial success. The only dividend paid to shareholders was in 1859, using the proceeds from the sale of the canal to the London and South Western Railway, who bought it to lay a railway line along much of its course. The railway line is now also defunct.

== History ==
The first survey for an Andover Canal was carried out in 1770 by Robert Whitworth, at a time when there was a great deal of canal building activity in the country. The canal would follow the valley of the River Anton, until it joined the River Test, and then follow that valley down to Redbridge. He produced an estimated price for a narrow canal, and another for a wider canal. The following year, Parliament was approached for permission to bring a bill, quoting the River Avon Navigation (Christchurch to New Sarum) Act 1664 (16 & 17 Cha. 2. c. 12) from the reign of Charles II, which had granted rights to make several rivers, including the Test and the Anton, navigable. The bill was not submitted, which Phillips, writing his General History of Navigation in 1795, stated was due to objections concerning land purchase and possible damage to property, but a newspaper report in 1788 believed it was due to a lack of subscribers.

Andover Canal Act 1789
- Act of Parliament
- Parliament of Great Britain
- Long title: An Act for making and maintaining a Navigable Canal from or near the Borough of Andevor, in the County of Southampton, to or near Redbridge, in the Parish of Millbrook, in the said County.
- Citation: 29 Geo. 3. c. 72
- Territorial extent: Great Britain

Dates
- Royal assent: 13 July 1789
- Commencement: 20 November 1788 (Note: Start of session.)
Other legislation
| Amended by | Andevor Canal Sale Act 1846 |

Status: Amended

Text of statute as originally enacted

Interest in the scheme revived in 1788, when a meeting was held in Andover on 4 August. With support from Andover Corporation, a committee was appointed, and Robert Whitworth carried out another survey. Of the estimated £35,000, over £19,000 had been pledged within two weeks, and by the time the bill was submitted to Parliament in March 1789, this figure had risen to £30,700. An act of Parliament, the Andover Canal Act 1789 (29 Geo. 3. c. 72) was obtained on 13 July, which created "The Company of Proprietors of the Andevor [sic] Canal Navigation", who had powers to raise £35,000 by the issuing of shares, and an additional £30,000 if required, of which £10,000 could be raised by issuing more shares and £20,000 by mortgage. Management was by a committee of 15, appointed from among the proprietors. One unusual aspect of the Andover Canal Act 1789 was that it specified that the canal could open between 4:00 am and 10:00 pm, and that the maximum size of barges was to be 60 by 8 feet (18.3 by 2.4 m) with a draught of 3.5 feet (1.1 m).

The canal was completed in 1794 at a cost of £48,000; £35,000 had been raised by issuing shares and £13,000 had been borrowed. The canal locks were built to take boats up to 65 feet (20 m) long and 8 feet 6 inches (2.6 m) wide, which was somewhat bigger than the enabling act of Parliament allowed. The main cargos of the canal were coal, slates and manure coming in from Southampton Water and agricultural produce going out, although boats were often unable to find cargos for the journey back out to Southampton Water. The canal was never successful enough to pay a dividend until it closed in 1859, when income from the sale to Andover & Redbridge Railway produced one. In 1827 the canal was 8 years behind on its interest payments although this had improved to only one year by 1851.

=== Demise ===
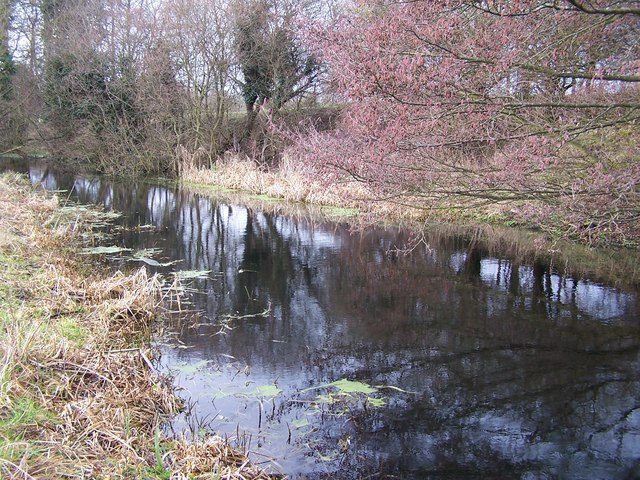
Surviving section of Andover Canal near Nursling, between Redbridge and Romsey.

The Manchester and Southampton Railway (MSR) agreed to buy the canal for £30,000 in 1845, but while the bill was progressing through Parliament, the railway company and the London and South Western Railway (LSWR) agreed to share ownership of both the canal and the railway line from Redbridge to Andover, at which point the Great Western Railway (GWR) objected, and the bill was defeated. Two years later, the MSR again tried to get an act of Parliament for the line, but again it was defeated. The LSWR, however, obtained a bill for a line from Salisbury to Basingstoke, which would pass through Andover, and were also empowered to buy the canal. Work on this line stopped in 1849, at which point the canal company bought the sixteen barges that worked on the canal and operated the boats themselves. This solved the problem of potential toll reductions which the barge operators were requesting. The two railway companies, now acting together again, decided that the canal should close, once the purchase money had been given to the shareholders. £9,000 was paid in 1851, but the rest was not. Local landowners then set up a company to complete the railway link between Basingstoke and Salisbury. It reached Andover in 1854, after which the canal maintained its traffic by reducing tolls, but the reduced income resulted in the interest on loans not being paid.

A complicated series of negotiations then took place, with the GWR attempting to buy the canal, then encouraging the canal company to form the Andover Canal Railway Company, which would build a broad-gauge railway along its course to Southampton, and finally both companies trying to buy the canal. In the end, they reached agreement, the LSWR made the purchase, and the line was laid to standard gauge. The canal ceased to operate on 19 September 1859, and the railway, nicknamed the Sprat and Winkle Line, was opened on 6 March 1865. Around 14.5 miles (23.3 km) of the canal bed were used for the railway.

Much of this railway has since also been abandoned. As a result, most traces of the canal have completely disappeared, although the remains of a stretch of the canal can still be seen between Timsbury and Romsey.

In addition, several stretches of canal can be made out alongside the old railway track bed such as at Brook and also between Westover and Fullerton, where reasonable stone and brick remains of a lock are evident.

== Course ==
The canal terminus was on the south side of the River Anton in Andover. It then followed the river to its junction with the River Test, and crossed both rivers on two aqueducts. Below the aqueducts, it followed the east bank of the river to Redbridge. Above Kimbridge, there was a junction with the Salisbury and Southampton Canal. The junction with the Test at Redbridge, from where access to Southampton Water was possible, was situated above the medieval bridge, although the original plans showed it a little further to the south on the foreshore. The total length of the canal was 22 miles (35 km), and the 24 locks dropped the level through 179 feet (55 m).

== Points of interest ==
| Point | Coordinates (Links to map resources) | OS Grid Ref | Notes |
|---|---|---|---|
| Andover Wharf | 51.2044°N 1.4823°W | SU362451 | |
| Andover | 51.1943°N 1.4929°W | SU355440 | |
| Goodworth Clatford | 51.1783°N 1.4825°W | SU362422 | railway line |
| Remains of canal | 51.1621°N 1.4654°W | SU374404 | railway line straighter |
| River Anton aqueduct | 51.1539°N 1.4601°W | SU378395 | |
| River Test aqueduct | 51.1509°N 1.4554°W | SU381392 | |
| Stockbridge | 51.1139°N 1.4883°W | SU359350 | railway line |
| Jn with Salisbury & Southampton Canal | 51.0351°N 1.5280°W | SU331263 | Kimbridge |
| Timsbury | 51.0241°N 1.5134°W | SU342250 | |
| Romsey | 50.9992°N 1.4875°W | SU360223 | |
| Remains of canal | 50.9595°N 1.4844°W | SU363179 | |
| Nursling | 50.9371°N 1.4849°W | SU362154 | railway line straighter |
| Jn with River Test | 50.9226°N 1.4755°W | SU369138 | |

== See also ==
- Canals of Great Britain

== Bibliography ==
- Hadfield, Charles (1969). The Canals of South and South East England. David and Charles. ISBN 978-0-7153-4693-8.
- Priestley, Joseph (1831). "Historical Account of the Navigable Rivers, Canals, and Railways of Great Britain". Archived from the original on 13 March 2016.
- Russell, Ronald (1982). Lost Canals and Waterways of Britain. David and Charles. ISBN 978-0-7153-8072-7.
- Vine, P.A.L (1990). Hampshire Waterways. Middleton Press. ISBN 978-0-906520-84-0.
