= Abbotts Ann =

Village and parish in Hampshire, England

Abbotts Ann is a village in the parish of the same name, approximately 2 miles (3.2 km) south-west of Andover, Hampshire, England. The population of the civil parish at the 2011 Census, including Little Ann and Red Post Bridge, was 2,566. The civil parish falls into two Wards; those of Anna and Andover Millway. The area in Anna is referred to as the Parish Ward of Abbotts Ann, and the area in Andover Millway is Burghclere Down

== History ==
The village name Ann was derived from the Celtic river name 'Anne' meaning 'Ash Tree Stream' (now known as the Pillhill Brook). The first settlements in the area can be traced back to 50BC when the Atrebates cleared the forests and cultivated the land. During Roman rule the village prospered, and at the end of Dunkirt Lane a large Roman villa was built. Mosaics taken from this villa are now in the British Museum.

First mentioned as Anna when reportedly granted to the New Minster of Winchester by King Edward the Elder, it was later recorded in the Domesday Book as an area containing 8 hides and 3 mills. The long, narrow and roughly rectangular boundary is characteristic of West Hampshire chalk land parishes. Defined in Saxon times, or possibly earlier, this shape ensured that Abbotts Ann had its share of river, down land and richer waterside meadows. Before the Norman invasion the land was granted to the abbey of Hyde and became known as Ann Abbatis ("estate on the River Anne belonging to the abbot"). Little Ann was granted to the abbey of Wherwell. After the Dissolution of the Monasteries the estates passed back into secular hands.

In 1806, Robert Tasker settled in Abbotts Ann and later took over the blacksmith's business. Tasker and his brother developed improved iron ploughshares, which became popular for their durability and efficiency. This success led to the establishment of the Waterloo Ironworks in Anna Valley to meet the growing demand for agricultural machinery. In 1831, Robert Tasker built the Abbotts Ann school on its previous site in the village, and leased it to the Revd. Samuel Best, the Rector of Abbotts Ann. Built 39 years before education became compulsory, the school was one of the first in England to take children of all denominations. The school's name is Abbotts Ann C of E Primary School, and it has since moved to a new site which is surrounded by the countryside of Abbotts Ann.

Between 1915 and 1924 the Red Rice Estate, which included Abbotts Ann and much of the surrounding countryside, was sold. In 1934 the Government bought Little Park for the new Land Settlement Association, creating the largest influx of population into the village since AD500. The settlers came mainly from northern England and Wales, and those who stayed on made a permanent contribution to the village. Of the 517 houses in the village, in 2000, 107 had been built in the previous 20 years.

== St Mary the Virgin, Abbotts Ann ==
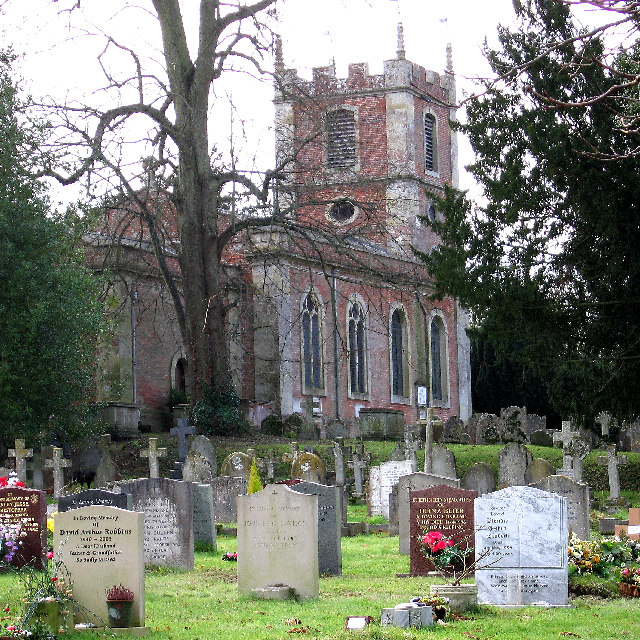
St Mary's Church, Abbots Ann

The presence of a church in Abbots Ann is first recorded in a charter granted by Edward the Elder in 901. By the 14th century a second, "more substantial", church had been erected on this site.

In 1710 Thomas "Diamond" Pitt, the grandfather and great-grandfather of the Prime Ministers William Pitt the Elder and William Pitt the Younger, purchased the estate of Abbots Ann, the manor house and the church. In 1716 Pitt – who had made a huge fortune from his sale of a 410 carat (82g) diamond, purchased for £20,400 (equivalent to £4,011,230 in 2025) and sold to the French regent, Philippe II, Duke of Orléans, for £135,000 (equivalent to £24,473,380 in 2025) – paid for the demolition of the existing church and the construction of the present parish church of St Mary the Virgin, Abbotts Ann.

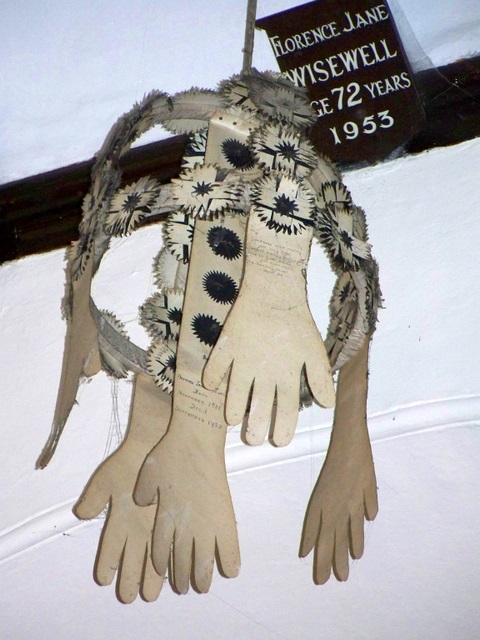
A Virgin's Crown, dated 1953, hanging in St Mary's church

=== Virgins' crowns ===
The church has one of the largest collections of virgins' crowns in existence, and Abbots Ann is the only parish in England which perpetuates the custom of awarding them. The crowns "may be requested by the relatives of the deceased person, who must have been born, baptised, confirmed and have died, unmarried, in the parish, and must have been of unblemished reputation." The crown is made of hazelwood and decorated with paper rosettes, with five paper gloves or gauntlets attached to it to "represent a challenge thrown down to anyone to asperse the character of the deceased."

At the funeral the crown is "suspended from a small white wand and carried by two girls aged between twelve and sixteen and dressed in white with folded handkerchiefs on their heads at the head of the funeral procession, laid on the coffin in the church and afterwards in the churchyard until the body is committed to the ground." It is then hung from a hook in the church gallery. If unchallenged after 3 weeks, the crown is hung from a hook near the ceiling of the church, with an escutcheon recording the name and date.

The oldest crown dates from 1740, and the most recent from 1973. Writing in 1992, local historian and author Pamela J. King observed that "With today's increasingly mobile population very few people are likely to spend all their lives in one parish and this ancient custom may disappear."

== Present ==
Today the village contains a village shop run by volunteers (which itself contains a post office – one of many recently threatened with closure), which achieved first prize in the Best Rural Retailer 2009 competition. The village also has a village hall, a primary school, a playing field and a pub called the Eagle, as well as another well-known pub in the neighbouring hamlet of Little Ann, called the Poplar Farm Inn. The village is also home to one of the last remaining classic red phoneboxes left in England, unfortunately it no longer has a working phone and instead houses local information.

== Abbotts Ann Players ==
The Abbotts Ann Village Players is a community amateur dramatics society inside the village of Abbotts Ann it performs most of its performances inside the Abbotts Ann village Hall which is known as a hub of the village. The village hall boasts a large stage the players normally perform on, the players have also performed at local village primary school known as the Abbotts Ann Church of England primary school. The Abbotts Ann Players have been running for the last 40 years performing shows such as 'beauty and the beast' and 'jack and the bean stalk'. The players are made up of residents from Abbotts Ann and surrounding villages and towns.
