= Goodworth Clatford =

Village and parish in Hampshire, England

Coordinates: 51.175910°N 1.485411°W

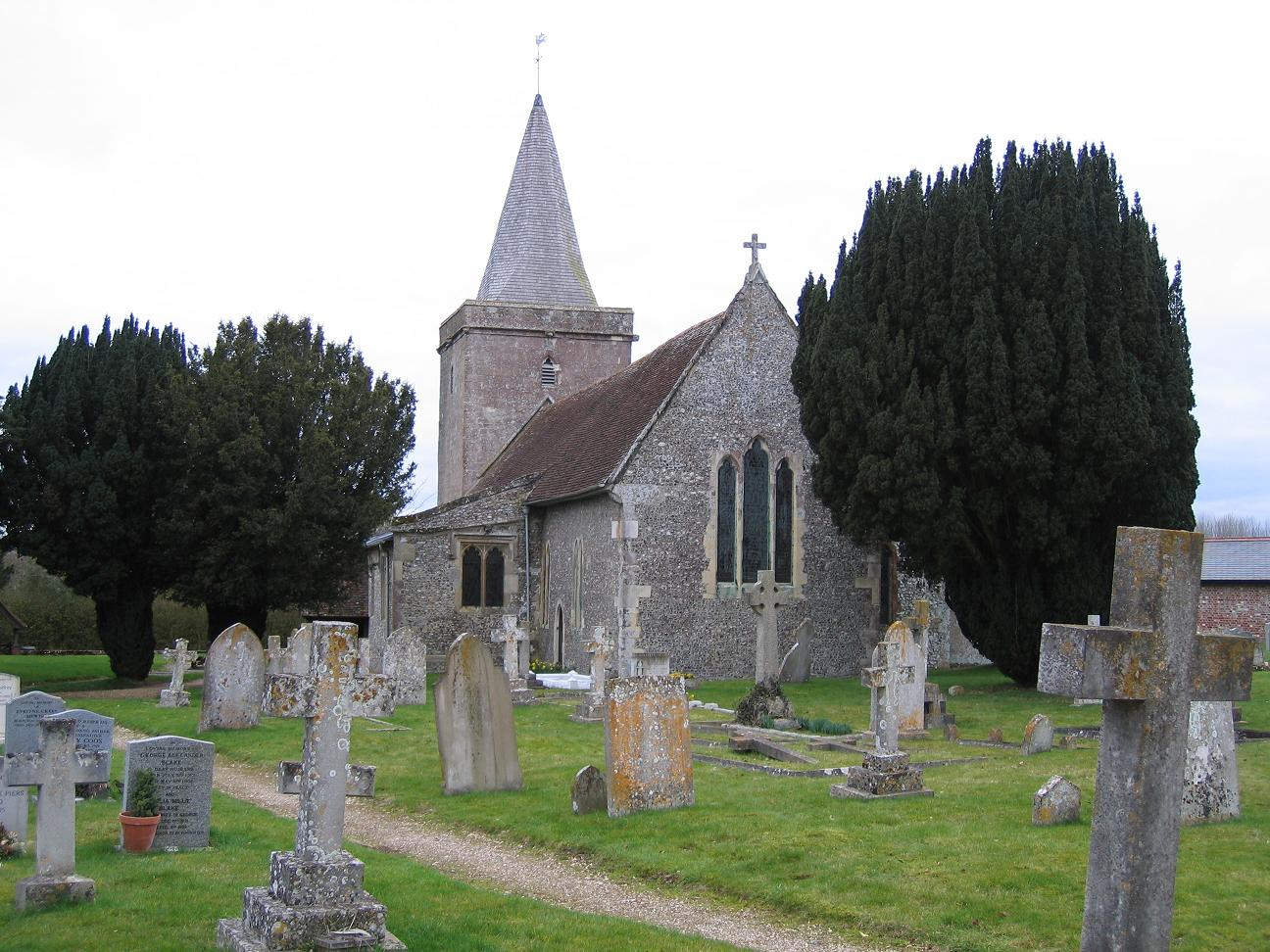
- St Peter's Church, Goodworth Clatford

- Location within Hampshire
- Population: 760 (2011 Census)
- OS grid reference: SU3606941978
- District: Test Valley
- Shire county: Hampshire
- Region: South East
- Country: England
- Sovereign state: United Kingdom
- Post town: Andover
- Postcode district: SP11
- Dialling code: 01264
- Police: Hampshire and Isle of Wight
- Fire: Hampshire and Isle of Wight
- Ambulance: South Central
- UK Parliament: North West Hampshire

Goodworth Clatford (formerly Goodworth and Lower Clatford which then joined) is a village located in Hampshire, England. It is south of the town of Andover in the valley of the River Anton. The neighbouring village to the north is Upper Clatford, to the south, Fullerton.

Goodworth Clatford is a community that shares various activities including bellringing, a gardening society, an efficient neighbourhood watch scheme, and various events at the central village club.

== Services ==
The village has a variety of services, from a tennis club with two popular tennis courts, Brownies and Guides, scouts, a large park, Riverside nature area, two pubs (the Royal Oak and The Clatford Arms), a primary school, Clatford CofE Aided Primary, which has seven classes and draws in pupils even from the large town of Andover nearby, a village shop run by the village community (which includes a Post Office), and the Village Hall.

== Education ==
=== State ===
Primary:

- Clatford C E Primary School
