= Pillhill Brook =

River in Hampshire, England

Coordinates: 51°11′45″N 1°29′31″W

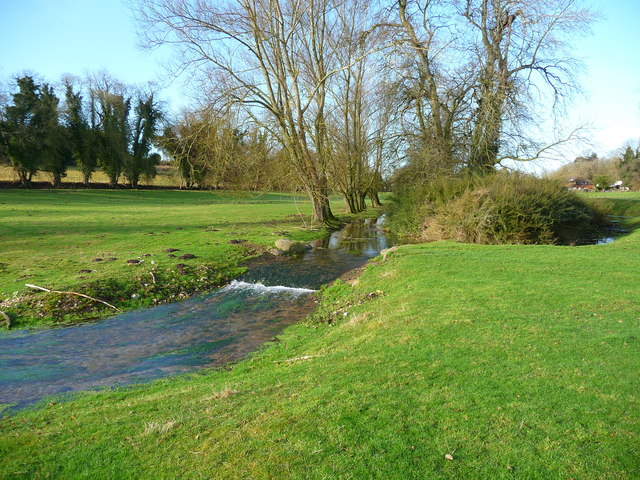
Pillhill Brook at Fyfield

Pilhill Brook is a 9.9-kilometre (6.2 mi) tributary of the River Anton in Hampshire, England. It is a chalk stream, known for its trout fishing.

The brook in the late 19th century which flows into the River Anton (right). The largely suburban town of Andover on right has multiplied in size, taking up the east half of its parish shown and land to the north.

== Toponymy ==
The brook is believed to have been called the Ann, or Anna. The name aqua de Anne is found in the Close Rolls in 1228.

== Course ==
The brook rises near Fyfield and passes Thruxton before flowing through Anna Valley past the villages of Abbotts Ann, Little Ann and Amport, joining the River Anton near Upper Clatford, which flows in turn into the River Test.

== Industry ==
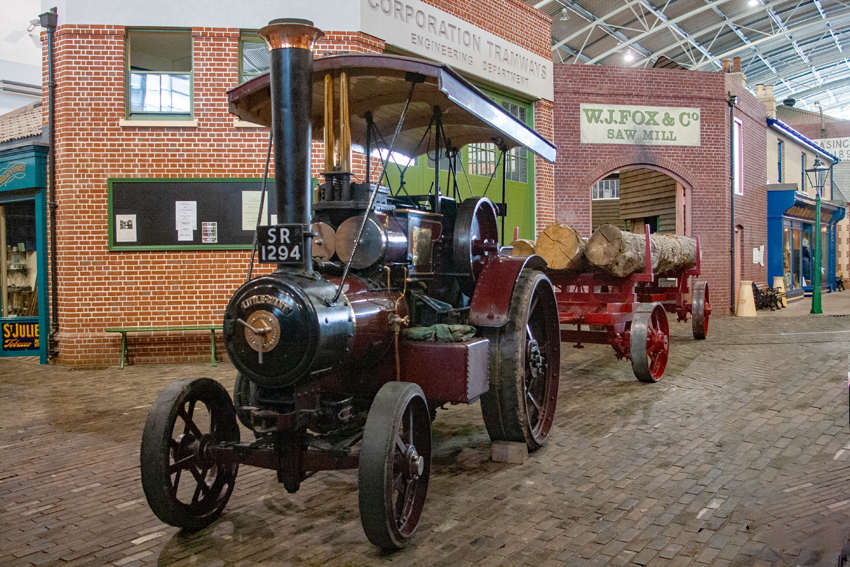
Tasker "Little Giant" traction engine and log trailer

in 1813, the brothers Robert and William Tasker set up the Waterloo Ironworks in the Anna Valley at Upper Clatford, using a waterwheel driven by the brook to power the forge. They specialised in making agricultural equipment, progressing to the manufacture of steam traction engines from 1865. There were four conventional watermills on the brook: Upper Mill at Monxton, Upper Mill at Abbotts Ann, Abbotts Ann Mill and Sarsons Mill at Amport.

== Water quality ==
The Environment Agency measures water quality of the river systems in England. Each is given an overall ecological status, which may be one of five levels: high, good, moderate, poor and bad. There are several components that are used to determine this, including biological status, which looks at the quantity and varieties of invertebrates, angiosperms and fish. Chemical status, which compares the concentrations of various chemicals against known safe concentrations, is rated good or fail.

Water quality of the Pillhill Brook in 2019:

Section	Ecological Status	Chemical Status	Overall Status	Length	Catchment	Channel
Pillhill Brook	Good	Fail	Moderate	9.879 km (6.139 mi)	69.913 km^{2} (26.994 sq mi)	

In 2021 there was concern about water quality after incidents of sewage discharge by Southern Water.

== See also ==
- List of rivers of England
