= Maiden's garland =

Crown-shaped garland used as a funeral memento for virgins

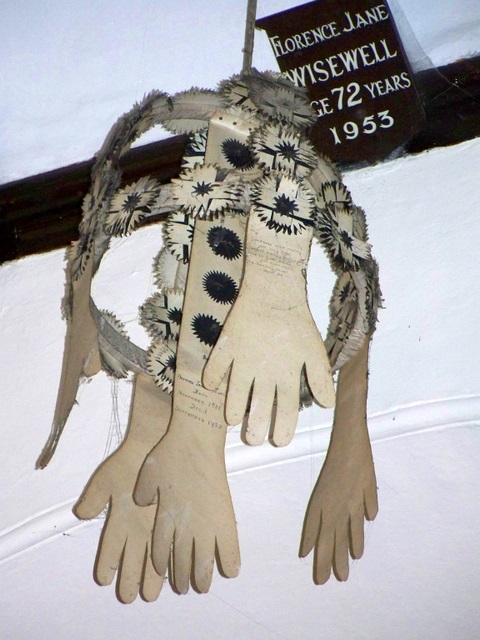
A maiden's garland, dated 1953, displayed in the church of St Mary the Virgin, Abbotts Ann, Hampshire.

A maiden's garland, also known as a virgin's crown, crants or crantsey, is a crown-shaped garland used as a funeral memento for, usually female, virgins. They are generally made of paper flowers, rosettes and ribbons fixed to a wooden frame. Many are also adorned with white paper gloves, and may be inscribed with verses of poetry and the name of the deceased.

== Practice ==
The garlands are carried before, or on, the coffin during the funeral procession and afterwards displayed in the church. W. R. Bullen, writing in The Tablet in 1926, reports that the "practice of carrying garlands at a maiden's funeral was common in England, Wales and Scotland before the Reformation and after it for two hundred years or more, but the custom has now almost entirely fallen into disuse." Shakespeare refers to the custom in his play Hamlet, when describing the burial of Ophelia:

here she is allow'd her virgin crants,
her maiden strewments, and the bringing home
of bell and burial.

== Surviving examples ==
The oldest surviving garland was made in 1680 and is hung in the Priests' room at St Mary's Church Beverley, Yorkshire. The largest collection of garlands (43, ranging between 1740 and 1973) is held at the parish church of St Mary the Virgin, Abbots Ann, Hampshire, and the most recent example was made in 1995 at Holy Trinity Church, Ashford-in-the-Water, Derbyshire. The parish church of Holy Trinity, Minsterley, houses an internationally famous collection of maiden's garlands. Examples have also been found in France: Edward J. G. Forse, writing in 1938, observed: "The paper rosettes and wreaths at Abbotts Ann I found paralleled in August 1919 at Montsoreau, near Saumur, and in July 1932 at La Malène on the river Tarn." There is a collection of garlands on display in Old St Stephen's church in Robin Hood's Bay, including a list of the ladies who have had them at their funerals. The latest date on the list is that of Eleanor Mennell who died in 1955 aged 90. It is not clear whether her garland is one of the ones on display or not.

== Etymology ==
The name crants, used most commonly in Derbyshire and the north, is believed to be derived from late Old Norse krans (/krans/ [kʰʁ̥ɑnˀs]) or Old High German kranz (/kʁants/), both meaning "wreath". Samuel Johnson, in Notes to Shakespeare, Volume 3: The Tragedies (1765), wrote: "I have been informed by an anonymous correspondent, that crants is the German word for garlands, and I suppose it was retained by us from the Saxons. To carry garlands before the bier of a maiden, and to hang them over her grave, is still the practice in rural parishes."

== See also ==
- Ukrainian wreath
- May crowning
- Coronation of the Virgin
