= Vitacress =

British agricultural company

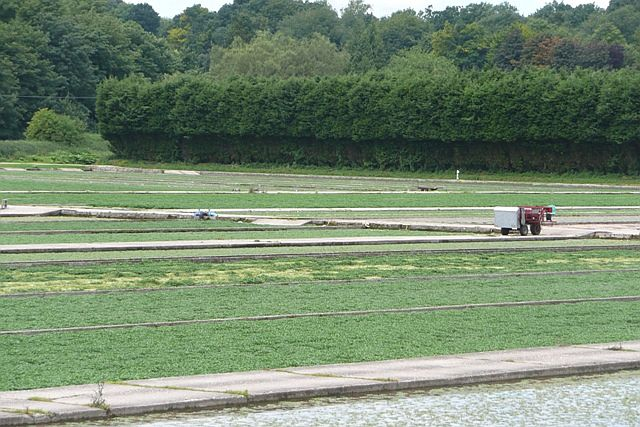
Vitacress watercress beds in St Mary Bourne

Vitacress Salads Ltd. is an agriculture company headquartered in St Mary Bourne, Andover, Hampshire, England. It is a fully owned subsidiary of Portugal-based company Grupo RAR. The company, which was founded in the 1950s by Malcolm Isaac, is Europe's largest provider of watercress, and also grows and packages washed rocket (arugula), spinach, and other baby salad greens. Beyond salad, the company also produces and distributes freshly harvested new potatoes. In addition to the UK, Vitacress has its own farms in Portugal and Spain. Vitacress supplies retailers and foodservice operators in several markets.

== History ==
The company, was founded in 1951 by Malcolm Isaac. In 1959, the watercress cultivation estate of Eliza James, known as 'the Watercress Queen of Covent Garden', was sold to Vitacress Salads Ltd.

In addition to the UK, Vitacress started operations in Portugal and Spain. Vitacress supplied retailers in the UK under their own brand (JSainsbury or Marks & Spencers). In Portugal and Spain, in order to diversify the risk and as a way to combat the slowing of the UK Washed & Ready To Eat salad market, Vitacress decided to launch its own brand (from Odemira, Portugal).

In 2007 Vitacress had a turnover of £81m and employed around 1,000 people. On July 1, 2008, Portuguese company RAR Group reportedly bought Vitacress for £52.5 Million.
