= River Anton =

River in Hampshire, England

(River) Anton
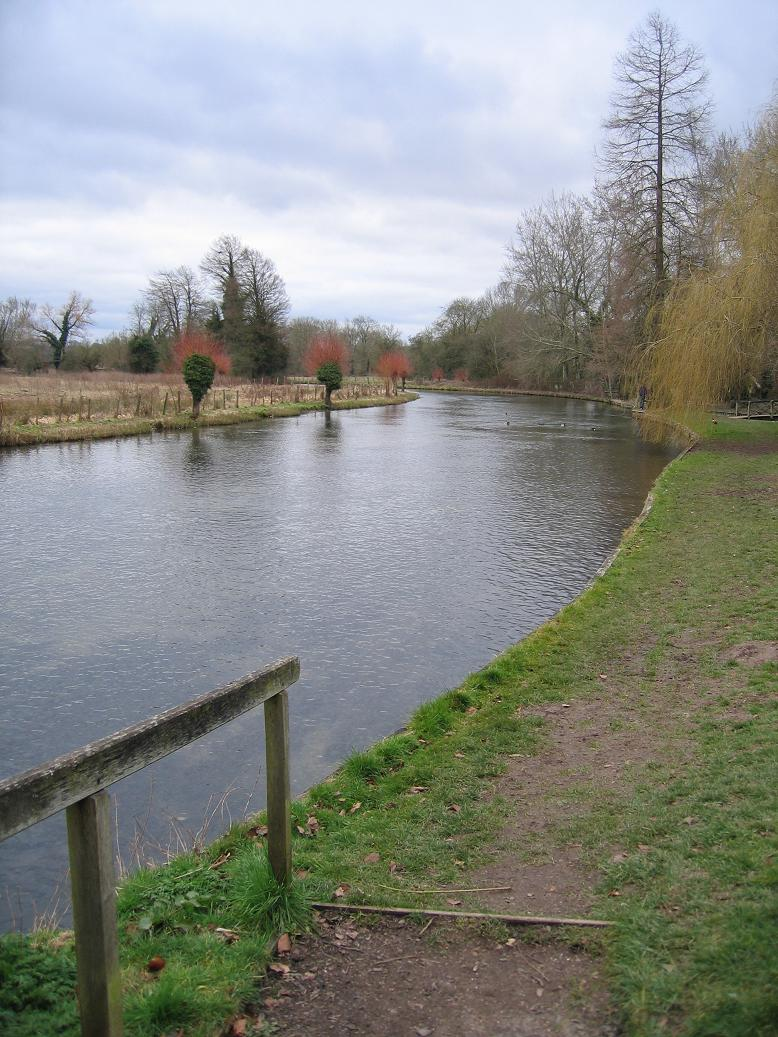
- The River Anton at Goodworth Clatford

- Outflow of the river in northern Hampshire

Location
- Country: England
- County: Hampshire
- Towns: Andover
- District/Borough: Test Valley

Physical characteristics
- Source
  - location: Andover
  - coordinates: 51°13′40″N 1°28′56″W
- Mouth
  - location: River Test at Goodworth Clatford
  - coordinates: 51°09′03″N 1°27′21″W
- Length: 9.3 mi (15.0 km)

Basin features
- Progression: Andover, Test, Southampton Water (sub-arm of English Channel, arm of Atlantic Ocean)
- Tributaries
  - right: Pillhill Brook

The River Anton is a chalk stream in Hampshire in south east England. It rises in Andover and flows southwards for approximately 8 miles (13 km) to meet the River Test near Chilbolton. The principal tributary of the Anton, the Pillhill Brook, joins the river at Upper Clatford.

== Course ==
The river rises in Anton Lakes nature reserve, in north Andover, just below King Arthur's Way, and flows through the centre of the town. It then flows in a southerly direction through the villages of Upper Clatford, Goodworth Clatford and Cottonworth before meeting the Test just below Chilbolton. It is a chalk stream with failing quality water and supports a wide variety of wildlife. The river is the subject of the "River Anton Enhancement Strategy", a partnership with several agencies and local organisations to improve the river.

== Leisure facilities ==
The Anton has some very good trout fishing with frequent catches of large specimens; fly fishing is the only method allowed. The fishing rights are private.

Created as part of its Enhancement Scheme, the River Anton Way was originally a scenic 3 3/4-mile (6-kilometre) walk along the river from Charlton Lakes in the north, via the town centre to Rooksbury Mill Local Nature Reserve in the south. In 2015, proposed by the Andover Ramblers and sponsored by Test Valley Borough Council, the way was extended by 5 1/2 miles (9 kilometres) through the parishes of Upper Clatford, Goodworth Clatford, Wherwell and Chilbolton.

== Watermills ==
There were five watermills along the river; Anton Mill, Town Mill, and Rooksbury Mill, all in Andover, along with Copthall Place Mill at Clatford and Fullerton Mill. Flour is still milled in Andover but at the electrically powered Junction Mills.

== Water quality ==
The Environment Agency measure water quality of the river systems in England. Each is given an overall ecological status, which may be one of five levels: high, good, moderate, poor and bad. There are several components that are used to determine this, including biological status, which looks at the quantity and varieties of invertebrates, angiosperms and fish. Chemical status, which compares the concentrations of various chemicals against known safe concentrations, is rated good or fail.

Water quality of the River Anton in 2019:

Section	Ecological Status	Chemical Status	Overall Status	Length	Catchment	Channel
Anton - Lower	Moderate	Fail	Moderate	7.077 km (4.397 mi)	32.876 km^{2} (12.693 sq mi)	
Anton - Upper	Good	Fail	Moderate	7.437 km (4.621 mi)	99.822 km^{2} (38.541 sq mi)	Heavily modified;
