= River Test =

River in Hampshire, England

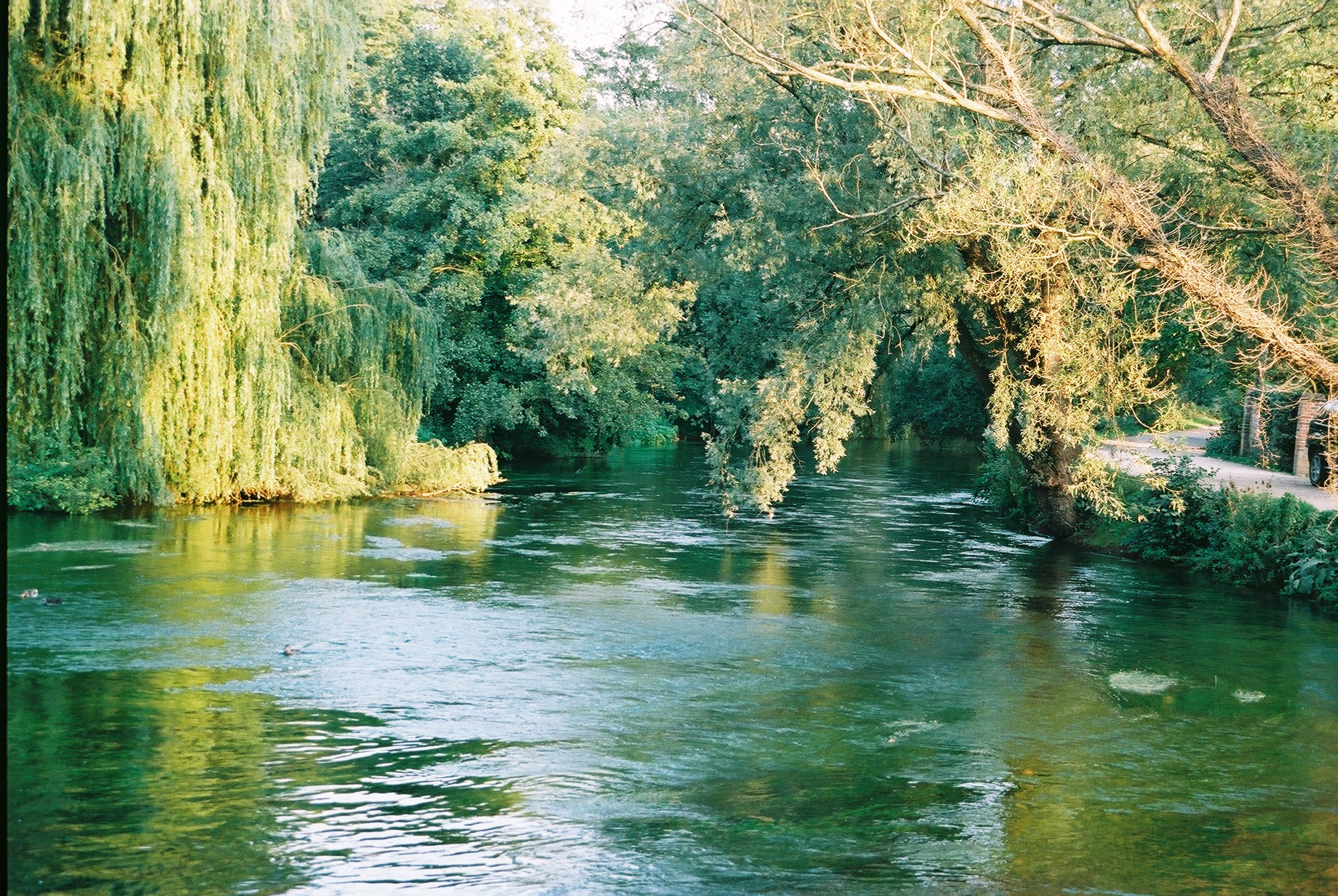
- The Test downstream of Sadler's Mill, Romsey

Location
- Country: England
- Counties: Hampshire

Physical characteristics
- Source
  - location: Ashe, near Overton, Hampshire, United Kingdom
  - coordinates: 51.2454°N 1.2392°W
  - elevation: 90 m (300 ft)
- Mouth: Southampton Water
  - location: Southampton, Hampshire
  - coordinates: 50.9251°N 1.4792°W
  - elevation: 0 m (0 ft)
- Length: 64 km (40 mi)
- Width
  - minimum: 1 m (3 ft 3 in)
  - average: 20 m (66 ft)
  - maximum: 56 m (184 ft)
- Depth
  - minimum: 0.5 m (1 ft 8 in)
  - average: 2 m (6 ft 7 in)
  - maximum: 4 m (13 ft)

Basin features
- Tributaries
  - left: River Blackwater, River Dun, Wallop Brook, River Anton, Pilhill Brook
  - right: River Dever, Bourne Rivulet, River Swift
- Site of Special Scientific Interest
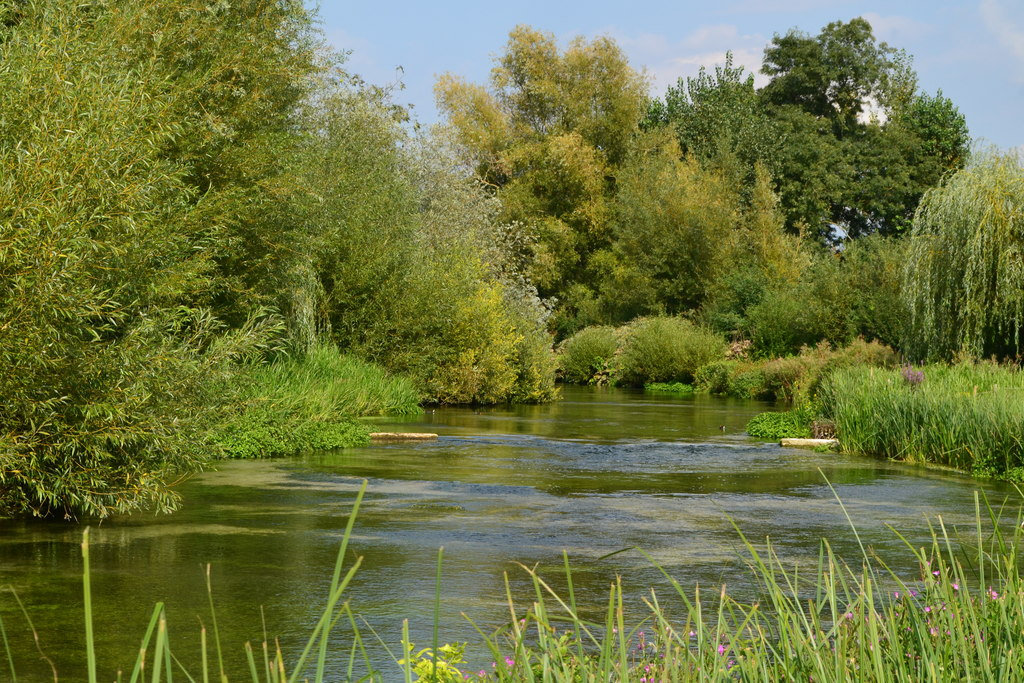
- River Test at Tufton
- Grid reference: SU 384 355
- Interest: Biological
- Area: 438.0 hectares (1,082 acres)
- Notification date: 1996
- Location map: Magic Map

The River Test is a chalk stream in Hampshire in the south of England. It rises at Ashe near Basingstoke and flows southwards for 40 miles (64 km) to Southampton Water. Settlements on the Test include the towns of Stockbridge and Romsey. The river's valley gives its name to the local government district of Test Valley. Below the village of Longparish, the river is broadly followed by the Test Way, a long-distance footpath.

Much of the Test is a 438-hectare (1,080-acre) biological Site of Special Scientific Interest. It is part of the Solent and Southampton Water Ramsar site and Special Protection Area. The river is used for fly fishing for trout from its source to its tidal limit.

== Etymology ==
Recorded forms are Terstan from 877 and 901, Tarstan stream in 1045, Terstein 1234, and Test in 1425. In Common Brittonic, not Old English, all related dictionaries show three suitable words beginning with tre- and none with extremely rare ter-. There is precedent to such metathesis: as for the river Tern in the far west, from tren 'strong'. If so it most likely relates to the Welsh tres 'tumult, commotion, contention, uproar' or trais 'force, might' (in older Welsh).

== Course ==
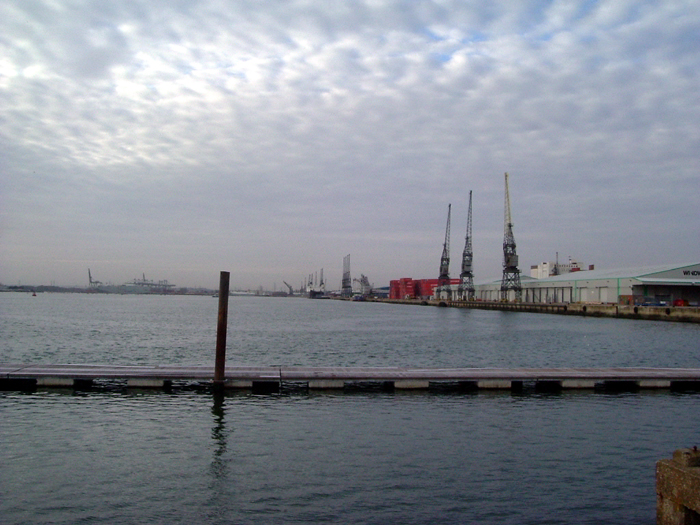
The Test is tidal in Southampton and is lined with quays

The river rises near the village of Ashe, 7 miles (11 km) to the west of Basingstoke (at grid reference SU 532,498), and flows west through the villages of Overton, Laverstoke, and the town of Whitchurch, before joining with the Bourne Rivulet at Testbourne and turning in a more southerly direction. It then proceeds through the villages of Longparish and Middleton to Wherwell and Chilbolton, where the rivers Dever and Anton join.

From Chilbolton the river goes through the villages of Leckford, Longstock, Stockbridge and Houghton to Mottisfont and Kimbridge, where the River Dun joins the flow. From here the village of Timsbury is passed, then the Test flows through the grounds of Roke Manor before reaching the town of Romsey. On the western edge of Romsey, Sadler's Mill, an 18th-century watermill, sits astride the River Test.

South of Romsey, the river passes the country house of Broadlands, and then Nursling, once the site of a Roman bridge. Finally the river is joined by the River Blackwater and soon becomes tidal, widening out into a considerable estuary that is lined on its northern bank by the container terminals and quays of the Port of Southampton. The Test estuary then meets that of the River Itchen and the two continue to the sea as Southampton Water.

Between Chilbolton and Redbridge, the river was once paralleled by the Andover Canal, which was itself converted to a railway in 1865, and then in turn abandoned. Most traces of the canal have disappeared, although the remains of a stretch can still be seen between Timsbury and Romsey.

== Ecology ==
This chalk stream has one of the richest fauna and flora of any lowland river in England. More than 100 species of flowering plant have been recorded along its banks and 232 invertebrate taxa in the river. It is also important for wetland birds, with breeding species including kingfishers, grey wagtails and little grebes.

=== Water quality ===
The Environment Agency measure water quality of the river systems in England. Each is given an overall ecological status, which may be one of five levels: high, good, moderate, poor and bad. There are several components that are used to determine this, including biological status, which looks at the quantity and varieties of invertebrates, angiosperms and fish. Chemical status, which compares the concentrations of various chemicals against known safe concentrations, is rated good or fail.

Water quality of the River Test in 2019:

Section	Ecological status	Chemical status	Overall status	Length	Catchment	Channel
Test (Upper)	Good	Fail	Moderate	14.803 km (9.198 mi)	177.062 km^{2} (68.364 sq mi)	
Test – Bourne Rivulet to conf Dever	Good	Fail	Moderate	8.286 km (5.149 mi)	32.01 km^{2} (12.36 sq mi)	
Test – conf Dever to conf Anton	Good	Fail	Moderate	3.869 km (2.404 mi)	13.295 km^{2} (5.133 sq mi)	
Test – conf Anton to conf Dun	Good	Fail	Moderate	28.075 km (17.445 mi)	56.88 km^{2} (21.96 sq mi)	
Test – conf Dun to Tadburn Lake	Moderate	Fail	Moderate	8.439 km (5.244 mi)	19.045 km^{2} (7.353 sq mi)	heavily modified
Test (Lower)	Good	Fail	Moderate	8.579 km (5.331 mi)	3.91 km^{2} (1.51 sq mi)	

== In popular culture ==
- The river features in Richard Adams' 1972 novel Watership Down. When the Watership rabbits are pursued by an enemy force, one rabbit carries out a plan which leads to their successful escape down the Test on a punt. In the text, readers are told that this plan would not have been possible on most rivers, but the Test's smooth-flowing, weed-free nature makes it an exception. The punt becomes lodged on a low bridge, and the surviving rabbits are forced to swim under the bridge to the riverbank.
- In The Adventure of the Five Royal Coachmen, along the river Test the private detective Solar Pons solves one of his cases by finding an abducted government official. This short story is part of the collection The Memoirs of Solar Pons by August Derleth, published in 1951.

== Tributaries ==
The following are the named tributaries of the River Test, listed in order upstream from Southampton Water.

- Tanners Brook
- Wimpson stream (historically; due to the extension of the docks it now merges with Tanners Brook just before it reaches the Test)
- River Blackwater
- River Dun
- Wallop Brook
- River Anton
  - Pillhill Brook
- River Dever
- Bourne Rivulet
  - River Swift

== See also ==
- Rivers of the United Kingdom
