= Grade II* listed buildings in Test Valley =

There are over 20,000 Grade II* listed buildings in England. This page is a list of these buildings in the district of Test Valley in Hampshire.

== Test Valley ==
Name	Location	Type	Completed (Note: The date given is the date used by Historic England as significant for the initial building or that of an important part in the structure's description.)	Date designated	Grid ref. (Note: The grid reference is based on the British national grid reference system, sometimes known as OSGB36, used by the Ordnance Survey.) Geo-coordinates	Entry number (Note: The "List Entry Number" is a unique number assigned to each listed building and scheduled monument by Historic England.)	Image
Pennymarsh	Little Ann, Abbotts Ann, Test Valley	House	late 16th century or early 17th century	20 December 1960	SU3319543673; 51°11′29″N 1°31′35″W	1279211	Pennymarsh
The Rectory	Abbotts Ann, Test Valley	House	Queen Anne	20 December 1960	SU3320343609; 51°11′27″N 1°31′35″W	1228705	The Rectory More images
Ampfield House	Ampfield, Test Valley	Country House	Mid 18th century	29 May 1957	SU3988723245; 51°00′26″N 1°25′58″W	1093686	Ampfield House More images
Church of St Mary	Amport, Test Valley	Parish Church	c. 1320	21 December 1960	SU2994544202; 51°11′47″N 1°34′22″W	1093280	Church of St Mary More images
The Firs	Amport, Test Valley	Apartment	Late 17th century	20 December 1960	SU3016944209; 51°11′47″N 1°34′11″W	1155840	Upload Photo
89, 91 & 93 High Street, Andover	Andover, Test Valley	Timber Framed Building	Built 1445-1455	24 February 1950	SU3648945677; 51°12′33″N 1°28′45″W	1264607	Upload Photo
Guildhall	Andover, Test Valley	Guildhall	1950	24 February 1950	SU3647145528; 51°12′28″N 1°28′45″W	1236337	Guildhall More images
Danebury Hotel (Star and Garter Hotel)	Andover, Test Valley	Coaching Inn	Early 19th century	24 February 1950	SU3650745386; 51°12′23″N 1°28′44″W	1093497	Danebury Hotel (Star and Garter Hotel) More images
The Angel Inn	Andover, Test Valley	Courtyard Inn	Built 1445-55	24 February 1950	SU3648245695; 51°12′33″N 1°28′45″W	1093460	The Angel Inn More images
Hill House	Appleshaw, Test Valley	House	Queen Anne	20 December 1960	SU3036548633; 51°14′10″N 1°33′59″W	1339464	Upload Photo
Mead House	Appleshaw, Test Valley	House	Queen Anne	20 December 1960	SU3067248320; 51°14′00″N 1°33′43″W	1339042	Upload Photo
Redenham House	Redenham, Appleshaw, Test Valley	Country House	Early 19th century	20 October 1960	SU2943249348; 51°14′33″N 1°34′47″W	1093912	Redenham House More images
The Old Vicarage	Appleshaw, Test Valley	House	Mid 18th century	20 December 1960	SU3041148843; 51°14′17″N 1°33′57″W	1229290	Upload Photo
Church of St Mary	Ashley, Test Valley	Parish Church	Early 12th century	29 May 1957	SU3849230903; 51°04′34″N 1°27′07″W	1339063	Church of St Mary More images
Awbridge Danes House	Awbridge Danes Estate, Awbridge, Test Valley	Country House	1822-25	4 March 1986	SU3187323051; 51°00′21″N 1°32′50″W	1093655	Upload Photo
Church Farmhouse and Garden Wall	Barton Stacey, Test Valley	House	15th century	7 January 1952	SU4336441380; 51°10′12″N 1°22′52″W	1093439	Upload Photo
Church of All Saints	Barton Stacey, Test Valley	Parish Church	Norman	20 December 1960	SU4348841145; 51°10′04″N 1°22′46″W	1302289	Church of All Saints More images
Pittleworth Manor House	Bossington, Test Valley	House	16th century	29 May 1957	SU3276929679; 51°03′56″N 1°32′01″W	1157769	Upload Photo
Braishfield Manor House	Braishfield, Test Valley	Country House	Mid 18th century	29 May 1957	SU3755026272; 51°02′05″N 1°27′57″W	1157292	Braishfield Manor House More images
Broughton Manor House	Broughton, Test Valley	House	c. 1800	29 May 1957	SU3117532879; 51°05′40″N 1°33′22″W	1166844	Upload Photo
Church of St Mary the Virgin	Broughton, Test Valley	Parish Church	12th century	29 May 1957	SU3089432914; 51°05′41″N 1°33′37″W	1093875	Church of St Mary the Virgin More images
Dovecote in Churchyard 50m north of Chancel of St Mary's Church	Broughton, Test Valley	Dovecote	17th century	29 May 1957	SU3090432966; 51°05′43″N 1°33′36″W	1166461	Dovecote in Churchyard 50m north of Chancel of St Mary's Church More images
Grandfathers	Broughton, Test Valley	House	c. 1700	29 May 1957	SU3129432641; 51°05′32″N 1°33′16″W	1166852	Upload Photo
The Lindens	Broughton, Test Valley	House	Mid 18th century	29 May 1957	SU3063133168; 51°05′49″N 1°33′50″W	1339070	Upload Photo
The Old Rectory	Broughton, Test Valley	House	15th century	29 May 1957	SU3089033050; 51°05′45″N 1°33′37″W	1093854	Upload Photo
Church of St Michael	Lower Bullington, Bullington, Test Valley	Parish Church	Norman	20 December 1960	SU4548541228; 51°10′07″N 1°21′03″W	1093440	Church of St Michael More images
Northwood House	Chilbolton, Test Valley	House	c. 1700	7 January 1952	SU3956540249; 51°09′36″N 1°26′08″W	1178985	Upload Photo
Church of St Winfrith	East Dean, Test Valley	Parish Church	C12/13	29 May 1957	SU2734126746; 51°02′22″N 1°36′41″W	1093769	Church of St Winfrith More images
East Dean Manor House	East Dean, Test Valley	House	Early 18th century	29 May 1957	SU2724626779; 51°02′23″N 1°36′46″W	1157343	Upload Photo
Park Farmhouse	East Dean, Test Valley	Farmhouse	17th century	29 May 1957	SU2686327107; 51°02′34″N 1°37′06″W	1301571	Upload Photo
Barn 30m east of Manor Farmhouse	Manor Farm, East Tytherley, Test Valley	Aisled Barn	c. 1600	11 April 1986	SU2923829504; 51°03′51″N 1°35′03″W	1093739	Upload Photo
Church of St Peter	East Tytherley, Test Valley	Parish Church	Mid 13th century	11 April 1986	SU2923429000; 51°03′35″N 1°35′03″W	1301531	Church of St Peter More images
Rolle House	East Tytherley, Test Valley	House	C20	29 May 1957	SU2943128792; 51°03′28″N 1°34′53″W	1301542	Upload Photo
Netherton House	Netherton, Faccombe, Test Valley	House	1964	7 January 1952	SU3763257770; 51°19′04″N 1°27′41″W	1093358	Upload Photo
Church of All Saints	Houghton, Test Valley	Parish Church	Early 12th century	29 May 1957	SU3414032657; 51°05′32″N 1°30′50″W	1339061	Church of All Saints More images
Houghton Lodge	Houghton Lodge, Houghton, Test Valley	Fishing Lodge	c. 1800	7 February 1986	SU3440133121; 51°05′47″N 1°30′36″W	1093833	Houghton Lodge More images
Old Rectory	Houghton, Test Valley	House	Mid 18th century	29 May 1957	SU3418132650; 51°05′32″N 1°30′48″W	1093859	Old Rectory More images
Garvery	Hurstbourne Tarrant, Test Valley	House	Early 19th century	20 December 1960	SU3827953167; 51°16′35″N 1°27′09″W	1093339	Upload Photo
Ibthorpe Farm House	Ibthorpe, Hurstbourne Tarrant, Test Valley	House	Early 18th century	20 December 1960	SU3780953688; 51°16′52″N 1°27′33″W	1339371	Upload Photo
Ibthorpe House	Hurstbourne Tarrant, Test Valley	House	Mid 18th century	20 December 1960	SU3766753798; 51°16′56″N 1°27′41″W	1093341	Ibthorpe House More images
Ibthorpe Manor Farmhouse	Hurstbourne Tarrant, Test Valley	House	Early 18th century	20 December 1960	SU3789953800; 51°16′56″N 1°27′29″W	1155768	Upload Photo
Rookery Farmhouse	Hurstbourne Tarrant, Test Valley	House	1776	20 December 1960	SU3816453083; 51°16′32″N 1°27′15″W	1093338	Upload Photo
Kimpton Manor Farmhouse	Kimpton, Test Valley	House	Early 19th century	20 December 1960	SU2814546666; 51°13′07″N 1°35′54″W	1339407	Upload Photo
Church of St John the Baptist	Upper Eldon, King's Somborne, Test Valley	Church	Late 12th century	29 May 1957	SU3643727792; 51°02′54″N 1°28′54″W	1093786	Church of St John the Baptist More images
Church of St Peter and St Paul	King's Somborne, Test Valley	Parish Church	12th century	29 May 1957	SU3602230979; 51°04′37″N 1°29′14″W	1339113	Church of St Peter and St Paul More images
Rookley House	Up Somborne, Kings Somborne, Test Valley	House	Early 18th century	5 December 1955	SU3954732753; 51°05′34″N 1°26′12″W	1303305	Rookley House More images
Sunken Garden on South of West Wing of Marsh Court	Marsh Court, King's Somborne, Test Valley	Garden	1901–1905	7 February 1986	SU3563033594; 51°06′02″N 1°29′33″W	1093807	Upload Photo
The Old Vicarage	King's Somborne, Test Valley	House	Early 18th century	29 May 1957	SU3615931077; 51°04′40″N 1°29′07″W	1296888	Upload Photo
Church of St Nicholas	Leckford, Test Valley	Parish Church	13th century	29 May 1957	SU3739037639; 51°08′13″N 1°28′01″W	1093181	Church of St Nicholas More images
Church of All Saints	Little Somborne, Test Valley	Church	Saxon	29 May 1957	SU3821632655; 51°05′31″N 1°27′20″W	1167714	Church of All Saints More images
School Farmhouse	Lockerley, Test Valley	Farmhouse	16th century	29 May 1957	SU3050426123; 51°02′01″N 1°33′59″W	1296775	Upload Photo
Longparish House	Longparish, Test Valley	Country House	Late 17th century	7 January 1952	SU4364244831; 51°12′04″N 1°22′36″W	1093433	Longparish House More images
Church of St Peter	Melchet Park and Plaitford, Test Valley	Parish Church	13th century	17 November 1986	SU2778220316; 50°58′54″N 1°36′20″W	1157584	Church of St Peter More images
Melchet Court (St Edwards School)	Melchet Park, Melchet Park and Plaitford, Test Valley	Country House	1863	17 November 1986	SU2707222266; 50°59′57″N 1°36′56″W	1339192	Melchet Court (St Edwards School) More images
Church of St Andrew	Timsbury, Michelmersh and Timsbury, Test Valley	Church	13th century	29 May 1957	SU3457524556; 51°01′10″N 1°30′30″W	1093717	Church of St Andrew More images
Church of St Mary	Michelmersh and Timsbury, Test Valley	Parish Church	12th century	29 May 1957	SU3460826622; 51°02′17″N 1°30′28″W	1296690	Church of St Mary More images
Manor Farm House	Michelmersh and Timsbury, Test Valley	Farmhouse	c. 1700	22 March 1979	SU3521526390; 51°02′09″N 1°29′57″W	1093754	Upload Photo
Michelmersh Court	Michelmersh and Timsbury, Test Valley	House	1986	29 May 1957	SU3467526674; 51°02′18″N 1°30′25″W	1093751	Upload Photo
Staddle Barn 15m north of Michelmersh Manor Farmhouse	Michelmersh and Timsbury, Test Valley	Staddle Stone	Mid 18th century	22 March 1979	SU3518926407; 51°02′09″N 1°29′58″W	1093714	Upload Photo
Church of St Mary	Monxton, Test Valley	Parish Church	Norman	30 April 1985	SU3128744572; 51°11′58″N 1°33′13″W	1093882	Church of St Mary More images
Stable Block	Mottisfont Abbey, Mottisfont, Test Valley	Gate Pier	1836	29 May 1957	SU3263027017; 51°02′30″N 1°32′09″W	1093729	Stable Block More images
Fifehead Manor Hotel	Middle Wallop, Nether Wallop, Test Valley	Manor House	17th century	29 May 1957	SU2893337884; 51°08′22″N 1°35′16″W	1093165	Upload Photo
Church of St John the Baptist	North Baddesley, Test Valley	Parish Church	11th century	29 May 1957	SU4025820862; 50°59′09″N 1°25′40″W	1093668	Church of St John the Baptist More images
Church of St Boniface	Nursling and Rownhams, Test Valley	Parish Church	Saxon	29 May 1957	SU3593316473; 50°56′48″N 1°29′24″W	1093670	Church of St Boniface More images
Church of St Peter	Over Wallop, Test Valley	Church	12th century	29 May 1957	SU2842638241; 51°08′34″N 1°35′42″W	1093127	Church of St Peter More images
Townsend Farm House	Over Wallop, Test Valley	Farmhouse	earlier core	29 May 1957	SU2800238382; 51°08′38″N 1°36′04″W	1093122	Upload Photo
Church of St Michael and All Angels	Weyhill, Penton Grafton, Test Valley	Parish Church	Norman	20 December 1960	SU3176246642; 51°13′05″N 1°32′48″W	1229819	Church of St Michael and All Angels More images
Clanville House	Clanville, Penton Grafton, Test Valley	House	Early 18th century	20 December 1960	SU3188249133; 51°14′26″N 1°32′41″W	1278896	Upload Photo
Ramridge House	Ramridge Park, Penton Grafton, Test Valley	Country House	c. 1740	20 December 1960	SU3127047767; 51°13′42″N 1°33′13″W	1229808	Ramridge House More images
Holy Trinity Church	Penton Mewsey, Test Valley	Parish Church	14th century	20 December 1960	SU3296747422; 51°13′30″N 1°31′45″W	1278801	Holy Trinity Church More images
Church of St Michael	Quarley, Test Valley	Bell Tower	11th century	20 December 1960	SU2728043985; 51°11′40″N 1°36′40″W	1339411	Church of St Michael More images
Broadwater House	Romsey, Test Valley	House	18th century	28 August 1951	SU3524221007; 50°59′15″N 1°29′57″W	1277499	Broadwater House More images
Railings at Broadwater House	Romsey, Test Valley	Gate		4 December 1972	SU3523621005; 50°59′15″N 1°29′58″W	1231605	Upload Photo
Bradbeers (Dolphin Hotel)	Romsey, Test Valley	Hotel	Early 19th century	28 August 1951	SU3525821152; 50°59′19″N 1°29′57″W	1231843	Bradbeers (Dolphin Hotel) More images
Former Corn Exchange	Romsey, Test Valley	Corn Exchange	1864	28 August 1951	SU3524021171; 50°59′20″N 1°29′57″W	1231877	Former Corn Exchange More images
Luzborough House	Romsey, Test Valley	House	Late 17th century	22 April 1985	SU3770920734; 50°59′05″N 1°27′51″W	1232586	Luzborough House More images
The White Horse Hotel	Romsey, Test Valley	House	18th century	28 August 1951	SU3524621254; 50°59′23″N 1°29′57″W	1232184	The White Horse Hotel More images
1 Church Court	Romsey, Test Valley	Timber Framed House	partly 16th century	28 August 1951	SU3520721279; 50°59′23″N 1°29′59″W	1231711	1 Church Court More images
37 and 39 Church Street	Romsey, Test Valley	House	Late 18th century	28 August 1951	SU3518621376; 50°59′27″N 1°30′00″W	1231749	37 and 39 Church Street
Ashfield Lodge	Broadlands Estate, Romsey Extra, Test Valley	Timber Framed House	1870	17 November 1986	SU3621619944; 50°58′40″N 1°29′08″W	1301303	Ashfield Lodge More images
Barn 40m north of Moorcourt	Romsey Extra, Test Valley	Timber Framed Barn	c. 1700	29 May 1957	SU3453217044; 50°57′06″N 1°30′35″W	1166645	Upload Photo
Moorcourt	Romsey Extra, Test Valley	House	15th century	29 May 1957	SU3452517002; 50°57′05″N 1°30′36″W	1093649	Upload Photo
Orangery	Broadlands Estate, Romsey Extra, Test Valley	Orangery	18th century	17 November 1986	SU3543420096; 50°58′45″N 1°29′48″W	1301341	Upload Photo
Ranvilles Farmhouse	Romsey Extra, Test Valley	Farmhouse	16th century	29 May 1957	SU3370718853; 50°58′05″N 1°31′17″W	1339186	Upload Photo
Stanbridge Earls	Stanbridge Earls, Romsey Extra, Test Valley	House	Mid 14th century	29 May 1957	SU3377323194; 51°00′26″N 1°31′12″W	1166424	Stanbridge Earls More images
Fairways, the Grosvenor Hotel	Stockbridge, Test Valley	House	Late 18th century	29 May 1957	SU3560035123; 51°06′51″N 1°29′34″W	1093088	Fairways, the Grosvenor Hotel More images
Kings Head House, Lane Antiques, Lane House, Leyanne Salon	Stockbridge, Test Valley	House	Formerly	27 November 1984	SU3581235091; 51°06′50″N 1°29′23″W	1093091	Upload Photo
Old Town Hall	Stockbridge, Test Valley	Town Hall	Dated 1810	29 May 1957	SU3549935104; 51°06′51″N 1°29′39″W	1093093	Old Town Hall More images
Remains of Old St Peter's Church	Stockbridge, Test Valley	Church	c. 1300	27 November 1984	SU3596134997; 51°06′47″N 1°29′16″W	1302362	Remains of Old St Peter's Church More images
Church of St Thomas of Canterbury	Tangley, Test Valley	Parish Church	Early Medieval	27 September 1984	SU3340952447; 51°16′13″N 1°31′21″W	1156218	Church of St Thomas of Canterbury More images
Church of All Saints	Upper Clatford, Test Valley	Parish Church	12th century	20 December 1960	SU3571643559; 51°11′25″N 1°29′25″W	1278644	Church of All Saints More images
Vernham Manor House	Vernhams Dean, Test Valley	House	Medieval	20 December 1960	SU3517656608; 51°18′27″N 1°29′48″W	1156458	Upload Photo
Church Farmhouse	West Tytherley, Test Valley	Farmhouse	c. 1300	11 April 1986	SU2757629754; 51°03′59″N 1°36′28″W	1093704	Upload Photo
Dean House	West Tytherley, Test Valley	House	1978	24 January 1978	SU2576827278; 51°02′39″N 1°38′02″W	1135717	Upload Photo
Norman Court House	Northaw School, West Tytherley, Test Valley	Country House	c. 1752	19 February 1986	SU2651930926; 51°04′37″N 1°37′22″W	1173046	Upload Photo
Church of St Peter and Holy Cross	Wherwell, Test Valley	Cross	Saxon	21 March 1984	SU3914640822; 51°09′55″N 1°26′29″W	1179499	Church of St Peter and Holy Cross More images
The Priory	Wherwell, Test Valley	Country House	Early 18th century	7 January 1952	SU3918040736; 51°09′52″N 1°26′28″W	1301832	The Priory More images
28 Church Street	Wherwell, Test Valley	House	15th century	20 December 1960	SU3912440933; 51°09′59″N 1°26′31″W	1093414	28 Church Street More images
