= Houghton, Hampshire =

Village and parish in Hampshire, England

Coordinates: 51.086280°N 1.512875°W

Houghton
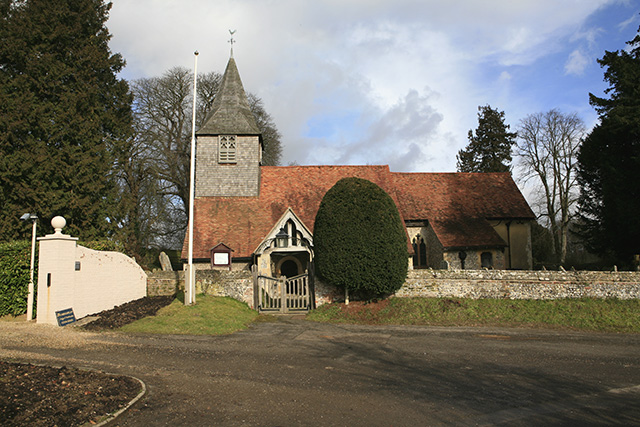
- All Saints Church

- Location within Hampshire
- Interactive map showing parish boundary
- Population: 443 (2021 census)
- District: Test Valley
- Shire county: Hampshire
- Region: South East
- Country: England
- Sovereign state: United Kingdom
- Post town: Stockbridge
- Postcode district: SO20
- Dialling code: 01794
- Police: Hampshire and Isle of Wight
- Fire: Hampshire and Isle of Wight
- Ambulance: South Central
- UK Parliament: Romsey and Southampton North
- Website: www.houghton-hampshire.uk

Houghton (/ˈhoʊtən/ HOH-tən) is a small village and civil parish in the Test Valley district of Hampshire, England. The village is situated alongside the River Test. Its nearest town is Stockbridge, approximately 1.8 miles (3 km) to the north-east. The village is a dispersed linear settlement, mostly strung out along the single road through the village, which broadly follows the course of the river north-south. Historically divided between the manors of North Houghton and Houghton Drayton, these names are still sometimes used for the northern and southern parts of the village respectively. The parish, which also includes the hamlet of Houghton Down on hills to the north, had a population of 443 in 2021.

Houghton is dominated by substantial agricultural estates at each end, the Houghton Lodge estate to the north and the Bossington estate to the south. Each owns, or traditionally owned, a number of properties in the village.

== History ==
In the summer of 1415, during the Hundred Years' War, the army of Henry V of England camped on Agincourt Field on the Bossington estate on its way to embark for northern France and the campaign which ended with the Battle of Agincourt.

John of Gaunt, 1st Duke of Lancaster, a son of Edward III from whom the Plantagenet House of Lancaster was descended, had a palace or hunting lodge in the neighbouring village of King's Somborne and a medieval deer park in the valley here in the fourteenth century. Some of the remains of the deer park's boundary embankments (or pale) can still be seen east of Houghton, near Black Lake Farm, when crossing the valley on foot on the Clarendon Way.

== Demographics ==
Census population of Houghton, Hampshire parish
| Census | Population | Female | Male | Households | Source |
|---|---|---|---|---|---|
| 2001 | 459 | 231 | 228 | 194 | |
| 2011 | 474 | 232 | 242 | 200 | |
| 2021 | 443 | 215 | 228 | 183 | |

== Landmarks ==
The village's architecture primarily reflects the Hampshire rural vernacular, featuring a mix of timber-frame and thatch alongside brick and slate. Nearly 50 buildings in the village are listed, including North Houghton Manor, Houghton Lodge, Houghton Manor House, All Saints Church, the Old Rectory, Bossington Mill, and Bossington House. Many smaller residences also carry this designation, the oldest of which, Corner Cottage, dates back to the fifteenth century. Approximately a fifth of the village's houses are listed, and most of the village falls within a Conservation Area designated in 1990.

Houghton Lodge is an example of the rare 'cottage ornée' style, of the late eighteenth century. The village also has an ancient church, All Saints, where services run on a weekly basis (with more at the tiny St James's church Bossington, set in open fields just to the south of the village.)

== Amenities ==
Several public footpaths intersect in Houghton, including the Test Way and the Clarendon Way. The latter crosses the River Test at the 'Sheep Bridge', a beautiful spot much frequented by swans and ducks and visited by the occasional egret. While these paths offer scenic views, there is no public right of access to the riverbank or the water itself. The spring-fed River Test is clear and teems with trout and grayling. Most of the fishing in and around the village is owned by the Houghton Lodge estate, the Bossington estate, or the exclusive Houghton Club, founded in 1822 and the oldest fishing club in England.

The village has a pub, the Boot Inn, with a garden running down to the banks of the River Test. There is no village shop or school.

Houghton has a village hall, used for functions such as the annual village harvest supper. There is a small recreation ground next to the hall.

== Notable people ==
- Henry Schwann (1868–1931), first-class cricketer who later changed his name to Henry Bagehot Swann, was born at North Houghton
