= Albert Porter =

Albert Porter may refer to:

- Albert G. Porter (1824–1897), Indiana governor
- Albert S. Porter (1904–1979), American politician from Ohio
- Albert Porter (cricketer) (1864–1937), Somerset and Hampshire cricketer
