= Stockbridge Town Hall, Hampshire =

Municipal building in Stockbridge, Hampshire, England

Stockbridge Town Hall
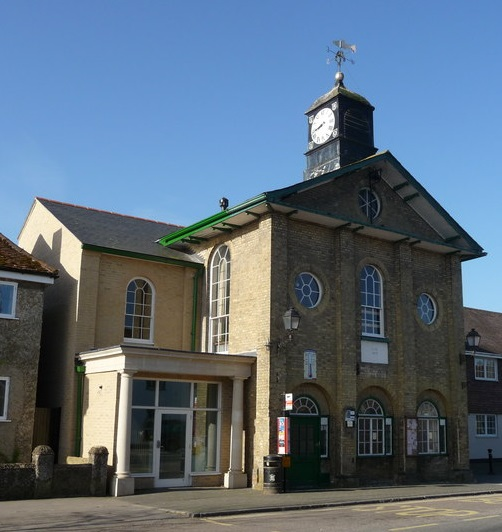
- Stockbridge Town Hall

- Shown in Hampshire
- 51.1141°N 1.4942°W
- Location: High Street, Stockbridge

History
- Built: 1790

Site notes
- Architectural style: Italianate style

Listed Building – Grade II*
- Official name: Old Town Hall
- Designated: 29 May 1957
- Reference no.: 1093093

Stockbridge Town Hall is a municipal building in the High Street in Stockbridge, Hampshire, England. The structure, which is used as the meeting place of Stockbridge Parish Council, is a Grade II* listed building.

== History ==
The building was commissioned by the prospective member of parliament, Joseph Foster Barham, as an inducement to the local borough council to support his election to parliament. The council had a history of accepting gifts in this way and a reputation for being notoriously corrupt.

The new building was designed in the Italianate style, built in yellow brick and completed in 1790. It was arcaded on the ground floor, so that markets could be held, with an assembly hall on the first floor. The design involved a symmetrical main frontage with three bays facing onto the High Street; the first floor was fenestrated by a tall round headed window in the central bay and by round windows in the outer bays, with the bays being flanked by full-height pilasters. The whole frontage was surmounted by a pediment with a deep timber frame and with an oculus in the tympanum. At roof level, there was a cupola with a weather vane.

The building was modified in 1810 with a clock added to the cupola and a date stone added just below the central first floor window. Stockbridge had a very small electorate and a dominant patron (Earl Grosvenor in the early 19th century), which meant it was recognised by the UK Parliament as a rotten borough. Its right to elect members of parliament was removed and its court leet, which had met in the town hall, was abolished under by the Reform Act 1832. The building was subsequently used as an events venue and it also accommodated a school in the late 19th century. Responsibility for the management of the town hall was transferred to a charity known as the Stockbridge Town Hall Trust in April 1924. Also, around that time, an adjacent cottage to the east of the building was acquired and converted to provide kitchen and toilet facilities.

An extensive programme of refurbishment works, costing £750,000, was completed in March 2010. The works, which were financed with support from the South East England Development Agency, Hampshire County Council, Test Valley Borough Council, Stockbridge Parish Council and Veolia, included new glazing in the openings on the ground floor, the demolition of the adjacent cottage and the construction, in its place, of a purpose-built annex with an enlarged entrance. Following the completion of the works, the building resumed its role as the meeting place of Stockbridge Parish Council, as well as an events venue for exhibitions, theatrical performances and concerts. After a projector was installed in the building in 2015, the newly established Stockbridge Community Cinema started showing films in the main assembly hall twice a month.

== See also ==
- Grade II* listed buildings in Test Valley
