= Corn Exchange, Romsey =

Commercial building in Romsey, Hampshire, England

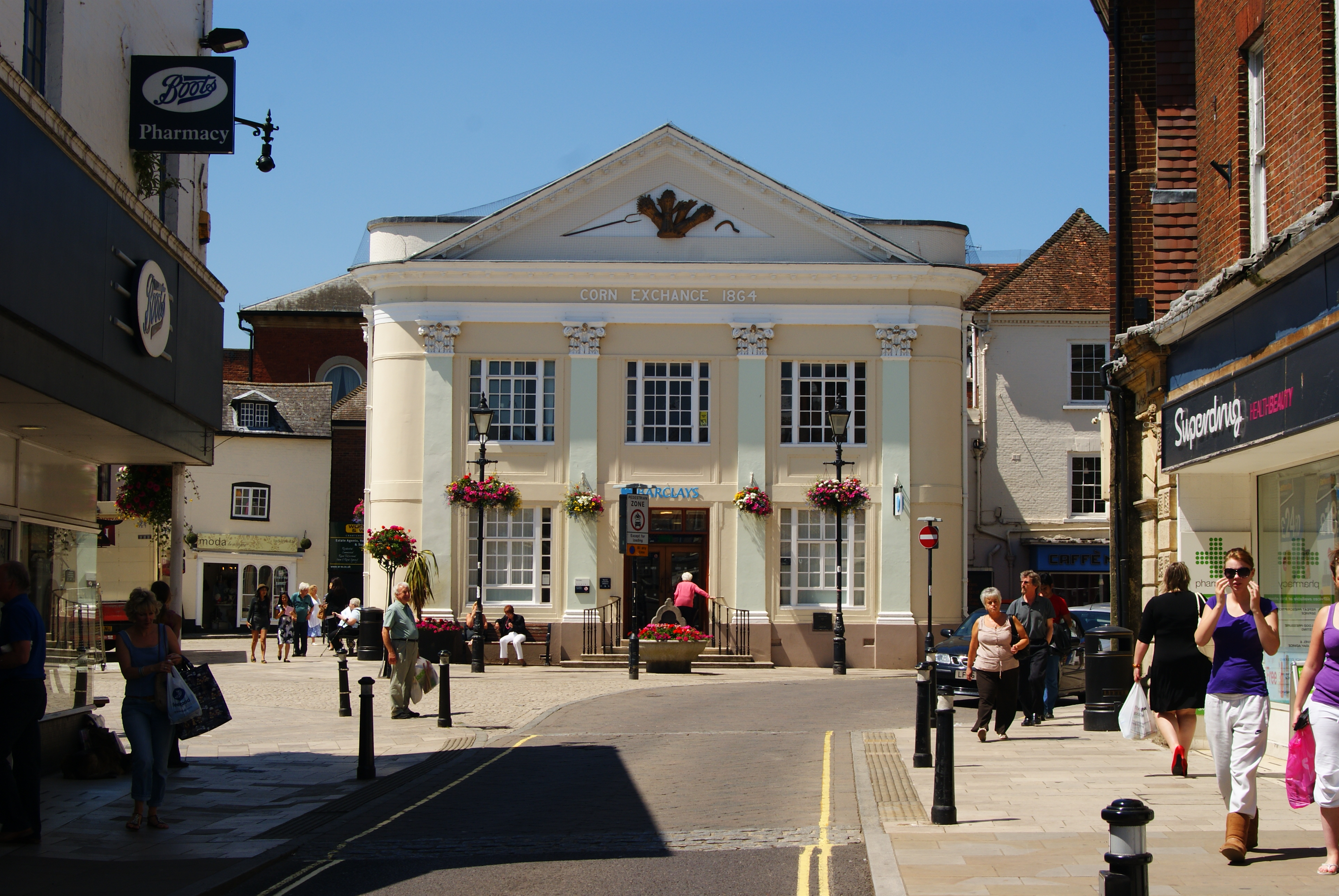
- Corn Exchange, Romsey

- Shown in Hampshire
- 50.9889°N 1.4993°W
- Location: Corn Market, Romsey

History
- Built: 1864

Site notes
- Architectural style: Neoclassical style

Listed Building – Grade II*
- Official name: Former Corn Exchange
- Designated: 28 August 1951
- Reference no.: 1231877

The Corn Exchange is a commercial building in the Corn Market, Romsey, Hampshire, England. The structure, which has been used extensively as a bank branch, is a Grade II* listed building.

== History ==
In the early 1860s, a group of local businessmen decided to form a private company, known as the "Romsey Corn Exchange Company", to finance and commission a purpose-built corn exchange for the town. The site they selected was a prominent position at the top of The Hundred in a position lying close to the main Market Place.

The building was designed in the neoclassical style, built in brick with a stucco finish and was completed in 1864. The design involved a symmetrical main frontage of three bays facing onto the Corn Market. The central bay originally featured a tall segmental headed doorway with an architrave and a keystone, while the outer bays were fenestrated by tall round headed windows with architraves and keystones. The bays were separated by full-height Corinthian order pilasters supporting an entablature, a cornice and a modillioned pediment containing carvings of gilded sheaves, a pitchfork and a sickle in the tympanum.

The building also became the main public events venue for the town: early visitors included the Prime Minister, Lord Palmerston, who gave a speech about education to the Romsey Labourers' Encouragement Association in January 1865. His step-son, William Cowper-Temple, 1st Baron Mount Temple, whose seat was at Broadlands, paid for a drinking fountain, which was placed outside the building in 1886.

The use of the building as a corn exchange declined significantly in the wake of the Great Depression of British Agriculture in the late 19th century. Instead, it operated as the "Corn Exchange Cinema" from the early 20th century until the First World War, when it became a drill hall for a detachment from C Squadron of the Hampshire Yeomanry and for C Company of the 4th Battalion the Hampshire Regiment.

The building was remodelled during the 1920s to introduce an upper floor: the changes involved a squatter doorway and a new French door with a balcony above the doorway in the central bay, and new tripartite windows on both floors in the outer bays. Tenants introduced at that time included a branch of Barclays and a grocery business, Hook Brothers. The balcony above the doorway was removed from the front of the building in the 1950s. Hook Brothers moved out when Barclays took over the whole building in the 1960s. The building became vacant when Barclays closed the branch in December 2022.

== See also ==
- Corn exchanges in England
- Grade II* listed buildings in Test Valley
