= Henry Schwann =

English cricketer, stockborker

Personal information
- Full name: Henry Sigismund Schwann
- Born: 19 November 1868; North Houghton, Hampshire, England
- Died: 27 May 1931 (aged 62); Meads, Sussex, England
- Batting: Right-handed

Domestic team information
- Years: Team
- 1890: Oxford University

Career statistics
Competition	First-class
Matches	6
Runs scored	204
Batting average	18.54
100s/50s	–/1
Top score	70
Catches/stumpings	1/–
- Source: Cricinfo, 17 April 2020

Henry Sigismund Schwann (19 November 1868 – 27 May 1931) was an English first-class cricketer and stockbroker.

The son of Frederick Sigismund Schwann, he was born in November 1868 at North Houghton, Hampshire. He was educated at Clifton College, where he played for the school cricket team and recorded a then record high score in an away match for the college of 209 not out against Sherborne School. From Clifton he went up to Corpus Christi College, Oxford. While studying at Oxford, he played first-class cricket for Oxford University in 1890, making six appearances which included playing in The University Match against Cambridge at Lord's. He scored 204 runs in his six matches, at an average of 18.54 and a high score of 70.

After graduating from Oxford, he became a stockbroker at the London Stock Exchange. In March 1917, he changed his name to Henry Bagehot Swann, presumably Anglicised from German to English due to anti-German sentiment in England at the time. Schwann died in May 1931 at Meads, Sussex.
