= Redenham =

Village in Hampshire, England

Coordinates: 51.242895°N 1.570025°W

- Location within Hampshire
- OS grid reference: SU3011149390
- Civil parish: Redenham
- District: Test Valley
- Shire county: Hampshire
- Region: South East
- Country: England
- Sovereign state: United Kingdom
- Post town: ANDOVER
- Postcode district: SP11
- Dialling code: 01264
- Police: Hampshire and Isle of Wight
- Fire: Hampshire and Isle of Wight
- Ambulance: South Central
- UK Parliament: North West Hampshire

Redenham is a small village in the civil parish of Appleshaw in the Test Valley district of Hampshire, England. Its nearest town is Andover, which lies approximately 4.8 miles (7.7 km) south-east from the village.

Redenham House is a Grade II* listed country house which stands in Redenham Park.

== See also ==
- List of civil parishes in England
