= Albert Porter (cricketer) =

English cricketer

Personal information
- Full name: Albert Lavington Porter
- Born: 20 January 1864; Croydon, Surrey, England
- Died: 14 December 1937 (aged 73); Tiverton, Devon, England
- Batting: Unknown
- Bowling: Unknown

Domestic team information
- Years: Team
- 1883: Somerset
- 1895: Hampshire

Career statistics
Competition	First-class
Matches	4
Runs scored	19
Batting average	3.80
100s/50s	–/–
Top score	7
Balls bowled	36
Wickets	0
Bowling average	–
5 wickets in innings	–
10 wickets in match	–
Best bowling	–
Catches/stumpings	–/–
- Source: Cricinfo, 28 January 2010

Albert Lavington Porter (20 January 1864 – 14 December 1937) was an English first-class cricketer and clergyman.

Porter was born at Croydon in January 1864. He was educated at Marlborough College, before matriculating to St John's College, Cambridge. Being resident at Bath in Somerset, Porter represented Somerset in first-class cricket in 1883, making appearances against the Marylebone Cricket Club at Lord's and Hampshire at Southampton. Porter took holy orders in 1888 when he was ordained as a deacon at Winchester Cathedral. Later that year he was appointed a priest at Guildford, before becoming curate at Fareham from 1888 to 1898. While undertaking his ecclesiastical duties at Fareham, Porter made two appearances in first-class cricket. The first came in 1890 against for a combined Oxford and Cambridge Universities Past and Present team against the touring Australians at Portsmouth, with his second appearance coming in the 1895 County Championship against Derbyshire at Southampton. In four first-class matches, he scored 19 runs with a highest score of 7. In 1899, he was appointed vicar of Braishfield, an appointment which he held until 1917; he was concurrently rector at Eldon from 1901 to 1907. Porter subsequently lived in Devon, where he died at Tiverton in December 1937. He was married with children, one of whom died in a motor accident in 1925.
