= Redenham Park =

Country house and estate in Appleshaw, Hampshire, England

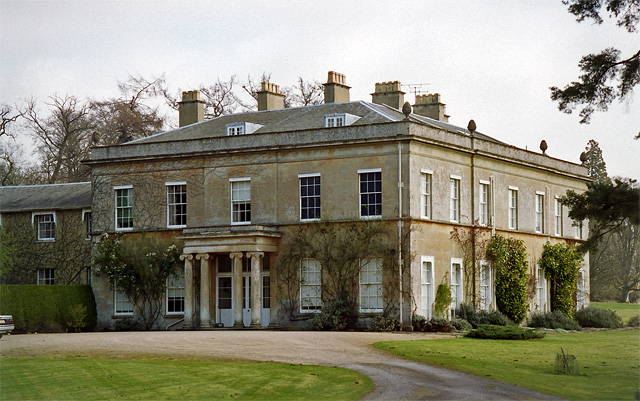
- Redenham House

- Location within Hampshire

General information
- Architectural style: Georgian
- Location: Andover, Hampshire, England
- Coordinates: 51.243°N 1.580°W
- Year built: 1784
- Client: Sir Charles Pollen
- Owner: Lady Olivia Clark

Technical details
- Grounds: 988 acres (400 ha)

Listed Building – Grade II*
- Official name: Redenham House
- Designated: 20 October 1960
- Reference no.: 1093912

Redenham Park is an estate in the civil parish of Appleshaw,^{[a]} Hampshire, England, surrounding Redenham House, an 18th-century Grade II* listed country house.

- History

The house was built in 1784 for Sir Charles Pollen and is a classical mansion faced with Bath stone, standing to two storeys with a slate roof and sash windows, and a central porch with coupled Ionic columns.

It descended in the Pollen family via Sir John Pollen, 2nd Baronet to the latter's great nephew Sir Richard Hungerford Pollen, 4th Baronet.

In the late 19th century the house was occupied by Major A.W.Fulcher, a well-known cricketer and yachtsman.

From 1976 the house and estate belonged to Sir John Clark, the chairman of Plessey. It is now occupied by his widow, Lady Olivia Clark.

== In popular culture ==
The park and gardens have been described as 'the perfect setting for a Jane Austen novel'. They comprise 2.5 hectares of garden, 24 hectares of parkland, 36.5 hectares of woodland and 337 hectares of farmland. The gardens are featured in The Good Gardens Guide and are open to the public by appointment.

== Notes ==
Transferred from Fyfield to Appleshaw in 2005 (The Test Valley (Parishes) Order 2005)
