= Rookley Manor =

Manor house on the Isle of Wight

General information
- Location: Isle of Wight, England
- Year built: 1203

Rookley Manor (also Roclee, Rokeley, Roucle) is a manor house in the parish of Arreton, Isle of Wight, England. Though originally in Godshill parish, it is now included for the greater part in the boundaries of South Arreton.

== History ==
The Lisle family owned Rookley Manor under their neighbouring manor of Appleford, and it is first mentioned in 1203 when Walter de Insula granted common pasture in Rookley to Philip of Blackpan. In 1272 a rent in Rookley was granted by Thomas Delamere to John Fleming, who is returned in the Testa de Nevill as holding jointly with William le Martre, half a fee in Rookley and Blackpan, with Robert Rookley also holding a quarter fee in Rookley. John Rookley held the vill (manor) in 1316 and was apparently succeeded by Adam Rookley, whose widow, Isabel, made an agreement in 1328–9 with Robert Rookley as to her life interest in land at Rookley. Geoffrey Rookley was holding a quarter fee in Rookley in 1346, and was granted licence in 1363 to have an oratory in his lordship of Rookley. In 1428 and 1431 Rookley was in the possession of Richard Coke or Cooke, a gentleman of Sussex, who was seised (had ownership) of a quarter fee there, another quarter held in 1346 by William Taunton and others not being answered for in 1428, as it was divided between Walter Veer and Thomas Lisle. The Cooke family seem to have remained at Rookley until the death of Thomas Cooke in 1519, leaving an infant granddaughter Mary.

The manor then passed in the same way as East Standen to the Bannister and Meux families. The Bannisters' third is not mentioned after 1546–7, but the two-thirds belonging to the Meux family passed with East Standen until the death of Sir William Meux in 1638. From the Meux family it passed to the Colemans. The last Coleman willed the manor after the death of his sister to James Worsley of Stenbury. In the early 20th century, the holding frequently changed hands. Mr. Holmes Leigh, who bought it from Mr. William Ash of Newport, sold it in 1911 to Mr. Wickett.
