= The Angel Inn =

Late medieval courtyard inn in Hampshire, England

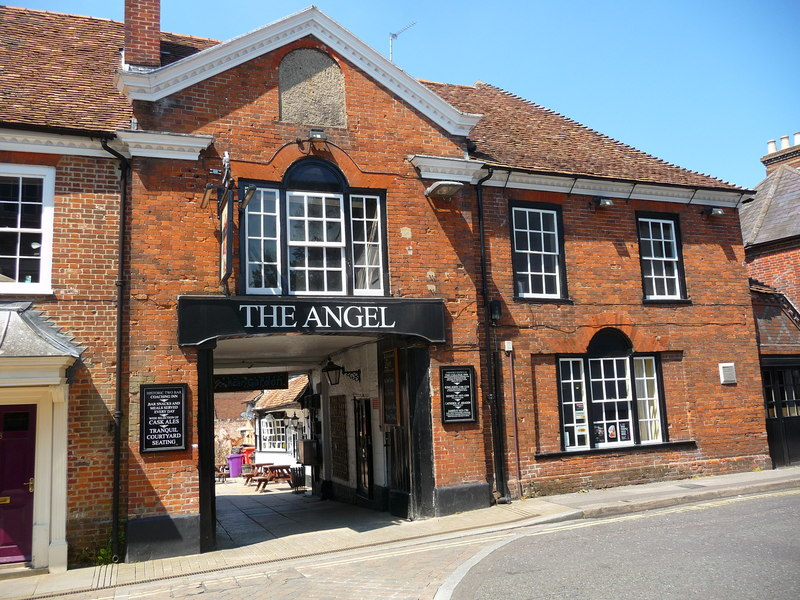
- Main façade of the building in 2012. Originally constructed in close studding with brick nogging, the façade was refronted with Georgian brick cladding in the late 18th century.

- Location within Hampshire

General information
- Type: Late medieval courtyard inn
- Architectural style: Tudor; Georgian
- Location: 95 High Street, Andover, Hampshire, England
- Coordinates: 51.2092°N 1.4790°W
- Construction started: c.1444
- Completed: c.1455
- Cost: £400
- Client: Winchester College
- Owner: Greene King

Technical details
- Structural system: Timber framing with cruck frame roof

Design and construction
- Architects: John Hardyng; Robert Whetely
- Main contractor: John Hardyng; Richard Holnest

Other information
- Number of bars: 2
- Parking: No

Website
- theangelandover.co.uk

Listed Building – Grade II*
- Official name: The Angel Inn
- Designated: 24 February 1950
- Reference no.: 1093460

The Angel Inn is a public house in Andover, Hampshire, England. Constructed in the mid-15th century, it is one of England's oldest surviving inns, and the oldest and most complete example in Hampshire. It is a Grade II* listed building, of "more than special interest nationally." Despite alterations in the 16th, 17th, 18th and 19th centuries, the medieval timber frame, features and decorative details remain "remarkably intact." Archaeological and documentary evidence suggest that it was built on the site of a previous inn—the College Inn—which was destroyed in the Great Fire of Andover in 1434.

Originally constructed of four wings enclosing a central courtyard, with an archway giving access from the street—typical of late medieval inns—the pub now retains the north and east wings. The west wing is no longer extant, while the surviving section of the south wing—which was divided from the inn for other commercial uses in the 18th century—is now also Grade II* listed (under the designation "89, 91 & 93 High Street, Andover.") The main bar room is situated in the ground floor of the north wing, which housed stables during the medieval period. The 'front bar' occupies the ground floor room—originally a high status guest chamber—at the eastern end of the north wing, looking onto the High Street. During the early 19th century, the front bar also served as the town's magistrates' court and guildhall.

In the 1960s, Andover became an overspill town for London, resulting in redevelopment of the town centre and the construction of a large shopping centre. The Angel Inn—along with other late medieval parts of the town—was initially earmarked for demolition in 1965 as part of the redevelopment, but was saved following a campaign by members of the public.

The Angel Inn is Cask Marque accredited and listed by CAMRA—the Campaign for Real Ale—as one of the best cask ale pubs in the UK.

== History ==
=== Earliest inns in Andover ===
Built between 1444–1455, The Angel Inn is the oldest surviving inn—and the oldest surviving building—in Andover. Local tradition claims that the site has housed an inn or tavern since at least 1174, and that a part of the fabric of the current building dates from this time. Although there is no documentary evidence for a 12th-century inn, stone "robbed" from the nearby 12th century priory has been found re-used in a Tudor dwelling on the High Street. H.W. Earney, in his Inns of Andover (1971), notes: "Saxon Andover consisted of two main thoroughfares—the Harrow Way to London, and the road from Southampton to Newbury. These two roads once crossed in front of the Angel Inn, so that it is likely, when the first Andover inn was built, that this was the most convenient spot for it to be sited." Edward Roberts also states that such a "prime urban site" would have been a likely location for medieval hostelries. Certainly, beer was being retailed in Andover by 1317, as an entry in the Guild Rolls for that year records a decree that beer should be sold in the town for the price of 1½ d. per barrel.

=== The College Inn ===
Formerly an alien priory under the control of the Abbey of Saint-Florent de Saumur in Anjou, France—to whom it had been gifted by William I in 1087 and William II in 1100—Andover Priory and its possessions were appropriated by royal charter to St. Mary's College, Winchester (now known as Winchester College) on 10 December 1414. Andover was a well-established market town, central to the thriving local wool and cloth industry, and situated at the crossing of several important trade routes as well as the Harrow Way, a prehistoric trackway still in use during the medieval period as a pilgrims' route to London and Canterbury. In importance, it was surpassed in Hampshire only by Winchester and Southampton, and its status ranked equally with Basingstoke and Portsmouth. Renting out an inn—which in the late medieval period served not only as a hostel for travellers but also as an important local hub for trading products such as fish, beer, wine and cloth—at such a location would have been a profitable investment for the college.

Thomas Kirby, the bursar of Winchester College and Hampshire secretary of the Society of Antiquaries, wrote in his Annals of Winchester College from its Foundation in 1382 to the Present Time (1892) that the site upon which The Angel Inn was built had previously been occupied by the College Inn, which was completely destroyed during the Great Fire of Andover in 1434. Although the College Inn belonged to St. Mary's College at Winchester, Kirby does not record whether it was built by the college post-1414 or was instead an even earlier inn obtained when the priory was appropriated. The college is known to have built at least one other inn, in 1418—also called The Angel—on the main market street of New Alresford, Hampshire. (Note: By 1424, New Alresford's Angel had been renamed The George "in recognition of the support of St. George to the English at Agincourt." Like Andover's College Inn, it too was destroyed by fire, in 1439. It was rebuilt by the College in 1460, destroyed by fire again in 1689 and rebuilt once more during the 18th century.) Archaeological surveys in the late-20th century exposed evidence of burning on the surface of the chalk situated beneath the south wing of the inn which may have been deposited by the destruction of the College Inn.

=== The Angel Inn ===
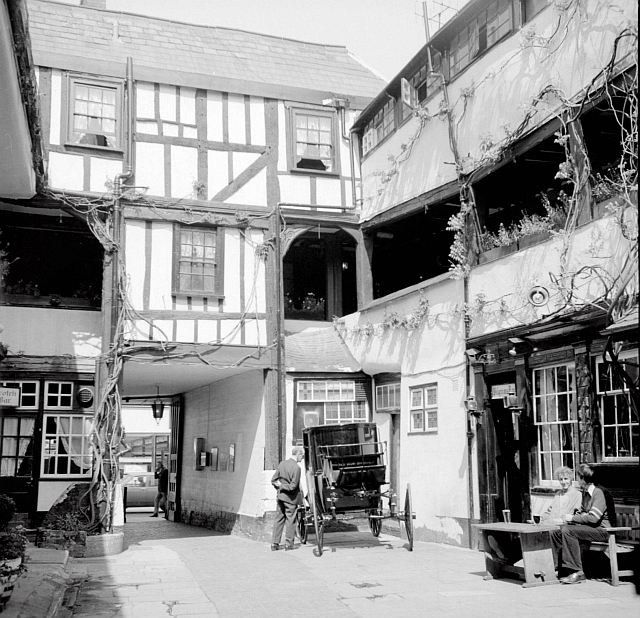
A 1973 photograph of The New Inn, Gloucester—the most complete surviving example in Britain of a medieval courtyard inn—illustrates how The Angel Inn's galleried yard would have appeared.

The fire of 1434 is believed to have started in a butcher's shop at White Bear Yard on the High Street in the upper part of the town. (Note: White Bear Yard connected West Street to the High Street. It was eventually demolished in the 1960s to make way for the construction of the Chantry Centre shopping precinct.) John Hare writes that the area destroyed included the High Street, the adjacent vicarage, property "on Soper's Lane", and probably extended beyond the upper town, causing "a serious impact on the town at large." (Note: West Street was known as Soper Street in 1367, and as Soper's Lane by 1493. It was still called Soper's Lane by 1850, but has also been known as Rowles Lane and Frog Lane.) The economic impact was such that in 1435 and 1437, Andover was exempted from the "fifteenth and tenth" annual taxation, and paid only half of the tax in 1439 and 1444, reductions which suggest "that there was a justifiable grievance and not just the common complaints of urban poverty." The loss of rent and tithes from its destroyed properties—and the opportunity to purchase now vacant land on which to build—led St. Mary's College to invest heavily in the redevelopment of the affected part of the town.

On 4 March 1445, Robert Thurbern, the Warden of St. Mary's College, contracted two carpenters—John Hardyng and Richard Holnest—to build a timber-framed inn on the site: (Note: Kirby records that the name "Niggesland" derives from the land's ownership, during the reign of Edward III (r.1327–1377), by Godfrey de Nugge.)

This endenture mad bytwene Mr. Robert Thurbern, Wardeyn of the college y called Seynt Marie College of Wynchester byside Wynchester, felows and scolers of the same college of that one parte, and John Hardyng and Richard Holnest, carpenters, of that other parte, witnesse that the said John and Richard shal wel and connably make in so moch as to carpentre bilongeth, that is for to say A inne with inne the toune of Andever, the which shal be sette in a voide ground in the North parte of the land y called Niggesland.

The plans were originally drawn up by Hardyng, but subsequently modified by Robert Whetely, warden of carpenters to Henry VI at Eton College, Windsor. The building contract, the detailed Winchester College muniments relating to its construction, and the survival of a "significant proportion" of the structure of the original inn provide what Edward Roberts describes as "a rare combination" of evidence that makes The Angel Inn "arguably one of the most significant timber-framed buildings in Hampshire."

Construction at the site had commenced before the contract was sealed: surviving documents record that by September 1444, timber was being carted from woodland near Kingsclere, followed by the digging of a well on the site and the laying of foundations made from beer stone quarried in Devon. Simultaneously, the college was building 3 new houses adjacent to the inn. As work began in earnest, 60 oaks were felled for timber at Chute, Wiltshire, 17,000 roof tiles were carted in from Mottisfont, windows were fashioned from Caen stone carted from Botley, and 20,000 bricks—probably used for the nogging of the inn's façade—were purchased from Daniel Brykeman. Two stonemasons—Thomas Beere and John Cotyn—were engaged to build the chimney stacks and fireplaces, and to line the cellars and latrine pits. One of the final acts was the painting of the inn's sign, which was made by John Massyngham at Winchester in 1452. (Note: The sign likely depicted the archangel St. Michael, the cult and legends of whom were widespread in the British Isles during the Middle Ages.) (Note: Roberts writes that John Massyngham was "a noted carver and polychromist", who also painted the statue of the Virgin Mary over the College Street Outer Gate at Winchester College in 1465-66. It is probable that Massyngham was the son of John Massyngham Sr., who was employed as a sculptor in the construction of All Souls College, Oxford, where his son assisted him.)

The completed structure consisted of 4 wings, with galleries on the upper floors of the north and south wings, enclosing a courtyard. The east wing presented the main façade and contained a gated archway, 12 feet (3.7 m) wide, giving access to the yard from the High Street. In the original plans, the archway was to be placed at the southern end of the east wing, but was instead built at the northern end. Roberts writes: "While this could be attributed to medieval indifference or uncertainty with regard to such niceties, a more plausible explanation is the desire to site the main entrance to the inn at the junction of the High Street and the main London road." A similar archway was also built in the opposite west wing.

== Innkeepers ==
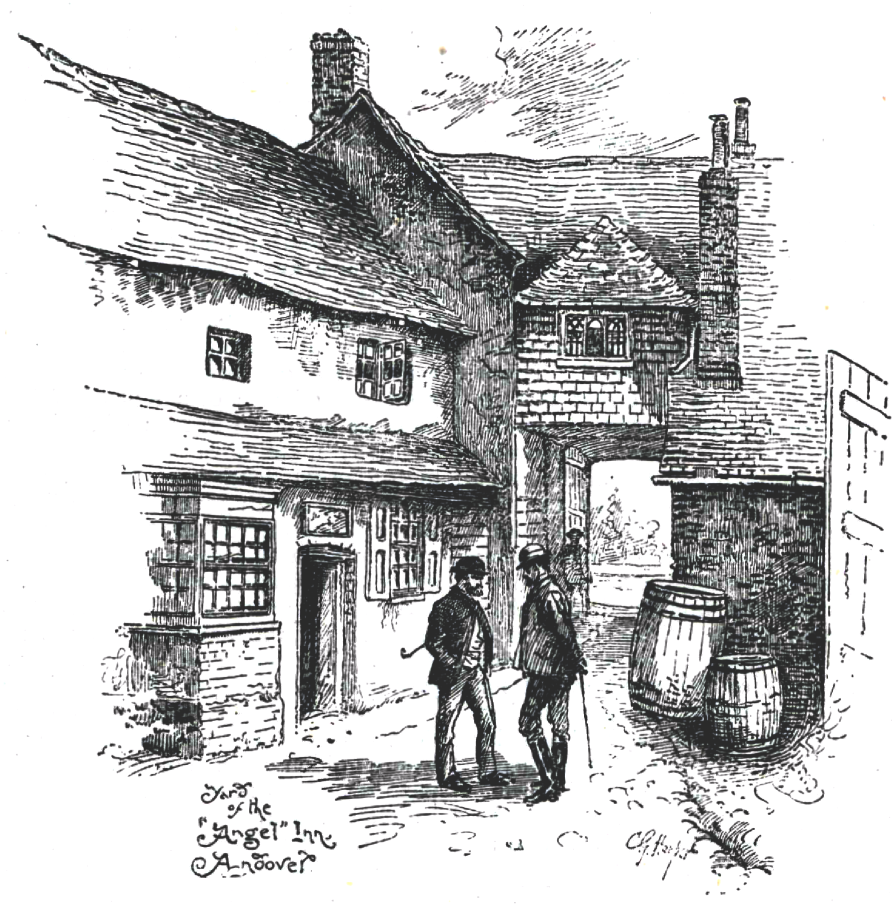
Yard of the "Angel" Inn Andover, sketched c.1890 by Charles George Harper.

Between 1456–1508, The Angel Inn had five innkeepers:

- Robert Cusse (1456–61)
- Thomas Fewer (1462–67)
- John Waterman (1467–93)
- Thomas Love (1493–96)
- Edward Chamber (1496–1508)

Between 1523–24, the innkeeper is known to have been John Williams, and between 1524–25, it was kept by his widow, Emma Williams. John Hare's study of the fifteenth-century personalities of Andover indicates that, as was the case in other parts of the country, the innkeepers were already "men of substance", from established families within the town, and probably prominent members of the gild merchant, or merchant's guild. John Waterman's older brother—also named John—appears to have been the innkeeper, with his wife Agnes, of Andover's other inn, Le Belle. The Waterman family were members of the gild merchant, as was John Jr.'s wife Isabella's family, the Lekes. When John Jr. retired as innkeeper in 1493, he drew up a will which included bequests of "acres of barley", demonstrating both his landholding and his involvement in the brewing of beer.

The gild merchant was also responsible for electing the town's bailiff and 24 town councillors, or "forwardmen". The Waterman brothers both served as forwardmen. Prior to becoming innkeeper of The Angel Inn, Edward Chamber had been the innkeeper of Le Belle and had also served as bailiff.

In the 17th century, The Angel Inn was kept by Richard and Marie Pope, the great-grandparents of English poet Alexander Pope (1688–1744). Alexander's father, Alexander Pope Sr. (1646–1717), was born in the inn. In 1642, Marie Pope was fined 20d by the town's magistrates for "not selling the best beere for one pennye." She was one of 28 inn- and tavern-keepers who fell foul of Andover's official Ale Taster that year, as he carried out his duty—laid down in the town's Great Charter of 1599—to visit all licensed houses and taste the beer to ensure that it was "fit and meet for men's bodyes" and being sold at the correct price. (Note: Andover continued to annually appoint an Ale Taster until the borough council was abolished and replaced by Test Valley Borough Council in the local government reorganisation of 1974. By this time, the office was known as "Town Crier, Sergeant-at-Mace, and Ale Taster to the Borough of Andover", and was purely ceremonial.)

== Henry Thornton's touring ensemble ==
Between 1787–1800, one of the wings of the inn was leased by Henry Thornton (1750–1818), a Georgian actor and theatre promoter, as a playhouse, staging up to 60 performances per year. Thornton had established a circuit of venues at coaching stops, each approximately 30 miles distant from each other—"a convenient length for a journey by coach on a winter's day." Paul Ranger describes these makeshift theatres as "comfortless", with boxes constructed from bales of hay and wagons "slung from the rafters" as galleries. Thornton's permanent company was made up of a core of family members—his wife and her brother and sisters, his two sons and two sons-in-law—but was also regularly augmented by London-based performers employed for short seasons ranging from a few days to several months. One of these was the Anglo-Irish actress Dorothea Jordan (1761–1816), who became the mistress and companion of the future King William IV.

Thornton was "a man with flair but with no eye for detail [and] little patience with learning lines, a habit which spread to members of his company." James Winston, in his The Theatric Tourist (1805), relates how, just before one performance at Andover, Thornton noticed someone in the audience holding a copy of that evening's play. Winston writes: "With such a potent evidence of their incorrectness, it was impossible to proceed..." Thornton announced that the performance was cancelled, owing to the troupe's prompt-book "having been unfortunately mislaid." The audience member offered his copy as a replacement and, "with a sigh of relief", Thornton began the performance. (Note: Thornton's lease was not renewed after 1800 and, in partnership with a local businessman, he subsequently established a new theatre across the road from The Angel Inn in Newbury Street. This theatre soon gained a reputation as "the noisiest in the kingdom." It was demolished in 1842.)

== Royal guests ==
- King John (r.1199–1216) reportedly visited an inn on the site in 1201. John maintained a residence at nearby Ludgershall Castle and was known to visit "to take advantage of the nearby hunting forests."
- Edward I (r.1272–1307) reportedly stayed at an inn on the site in February 1291.
- Edward II (r.1307–1327) reportedly stayed at an inn on the site in February 1317.
- Henry VII (r.1485–1509) stayed at The Angel Inn in 1497 when returning to London from Taunton after the suppression of the Second Cornish Uprising.
- Catherine of Aragon, then aged 15, stayed at The Angel Inn on 3–4 November 1501, escorted by Robert Willoughby, 1st Baron Willoughby de Broke, the Lord Steward to the court of Henry VII.
- James II (r.1685–1688) stayed at The Angel Inn on 25 November 1688, where he dined with Prince George of Denmark and James Butler, 2nd Duke of Ormonde, following his retreat from Salisbury during the Glorious Revolution. Having failed to persuade James over dinner that his cause was lost, the prince and the duke abandoned him under cover of darkness and defected to the side of William of Orange.

== Notes and references ==
Notes

Bibliography

- Collier, C. (1884), "Andover and its Neighbourhood", Wiltshire Archaeological and Natural History Magazine, 21 (63): 293–314
- Cunningham, W. (1891), "The Gild Merchant in England", The Quarterly Journal of Economics, 5 (3): 339–353, doi:10.2307/1879613, ISSN 0033-5533, JSTOR 1879613
- Doubleday, H. Arthur; Page, William, eds. (1903), A History of the County of Hampshire: Volume 2, London: Victoria County History, OCLC 927026816
- Earney, Hubert Wyndham (1971), Inns of Andover: A history of the inns, taverns and alehouses past and present of Andover, Hampshire (2nd ed.), Andover: Standard Press, OCLC 650255048
- Hare, John (2005), "Winchester College and The Angel Inn, Andover: A Fifteenth-Century Landlord and its Investments" (PDF), Proceedings of the Hampshire Field Club and Archaeological Society, 60: 187–197, ISSN 0142-8950
- Hare, John (2013), "Inns, innkeepers and the society of later medieval England, 1350–1600", Journal of Medieval History, 39 (4): 477–497, doi:10.1080/03044181.2013.833132, ISSN 0304-4181, S2CID 143589586
- Himsworth, Sheila, ed. (1984), Winchester College Muniments Vol.3: Estates (Part 2), Chichester: Phillimore & Co Ltd, ISBN 978-0-850-33496-8
- Jacob, Ernest Fraser (1933), "The Building of All Souls College, 1438–1443", in Edwards, J.G.; Galbraith, V.H.; Jacob, E.F. (eds.), Historical Essays in Honour of James Tait, Manchester: Manchester University Press, OCLC 504401707
- Johnson, Richard F. (2005), Saint Michael the Archangel in Medieval English Legend, Martlesham: Boydell & Brewer, ISBN 978-1-843-83128-0
- Kirby, Thomas Frederick (1892), Annals of Winchester College from its Foundation in 1382 to the Present Time, London: Henry Frowde, OCLC 457921938
- Padwick, C.J.; Spaul, J.E.H. (1966), Archeological Review Vol 1-7, Council for British Archaeology/University of Bristol, OCLC 145088545
- Ranger, Paul (1987), "The Rivals: Two Georgian Theatre Managers" (PDF), Proceedings of the Hampshire Field Club and Archaeological Society, 43: 219–235, ISSN 0142-8950
- Ranger, Paul (2001), Under Two Managers: The Everyday Life of the Thornton-Barnet Theatre Company, 1785–1853, London: Society for Theatre Research, ISBN 978-0-854-30069-3
- Redmonds, George (2004), Names and History: People, Places and Things, London: Hambledon Continuum, ISBN 978-1-852-85426-3
- Richardson, A. E.; Eberlein, H. Donaldson (1968) [1925], The English Inn, Past And Present: A Review of Its History and Social Life, New York: Benjamin Bloom, OCLC 635681807
- Roberts, Edward (1992), "A Fifteenth Century Inn at Andover" (PDF), Proceedings of the Hampshire Field Club and Archaeological Society, 47: 153–170, ISSN 0142-8950
- Roberts, Edward (2003), Hampshire Houses 1250–1700, Winchester: Hampshire County Council, ISBN 978-1-859-75633-1
- Smith, David M., ed. (2008), The Heads of Religious Houses: England and Wales, III. 1377-1540, Cambridge: Cambridge University Press, ISBN 978-0-521-86508-1
- Warmington, Richard (1976), "Rebuilding of 'Le Belle' Inn, Andover, 1534", Post-Medieval Archaeology, 10 (1): 131–141, doi:10.1179/pma.1976.007, ISSN 1745-8137
- Wilkinson, Philip; Ashley, Peter (2009), "Early Inns", The English Buildings Book: An Architectural Guide, London: Historic England Publishing, ISBN 978-1-850-74969-1
