= Church of St John the Baptist, Upper Eldon =

Coordinates: 51.0483°N 1.4816°W

- Church of St John the Baptist, Upper Eldon, from the southwest

- Location in Hampshire
- OS grid reference: SU 365 278
- Location: King's Somborne, Hampshire
- Country: England
- Denomination: Anglican
- Website: Churches Conservation Trust

History
- Dedication: Saint John the Baptist

Architecture
- Functional status: Redundant
- Heritage designation: Grade II*
- Designated: 29 May 1957
- Architectural type: Church
- Style: Gothic

Specifications
- Materials: Flint rubble, partly rendered, with stone dressings East wall brick Roofs tiled

The Church of St John the Baptist, Upper Eldon, is a redundant Anglican church in the parish of King's Somborne, Hampshire, England. It is recorded in the National Heritage List for England as a designated Grade II* listed building, and is under the care of the Churches Conservation Trust. The church stands in the grounds of Eldon House, to the east of the A3057 road, some 4 miles (6 km) south of Stockbridge.

== History ==
The church was built in the later part of the 12th century. By the 18th century its condition was dilapidated and the east wall was rebuilt in 1729. Its fabric subsequently deteriorated again, and in 1864 it was being used as a cowshed. Its condition continued to be bad, and in 1973 it had the appearance of a farm building, and a report stated "Its sole occupant is a beautiful white owl". The church was declared redundant on 21 December 1971, and it was vested in the Redundant Churches Fund (the forerunners of the Churches Conservation Trust) on 31 May 1973. In 1975 the church was repaired, including re-tiling the roof and re-plastering the interior. Further repairs were undertaken in 1984. The church is open daily for visitors.

== Architecture ==
St John's is constructed in flint rubble, partly rendered, with stone dressings. The rebuilt east wall is in brick, and the roofs are tiled. Its plan consists of a single rectangular cell 32 feet (9.8 m) long by 16 feet 8 inches (5.1 m) long. The north wall contains two original single-light windows about 15 inches (0.4 m) wide and 3 feet (0.9 m) tall. At the east end of the north wall is part of another window that was cut in half when the east wall was rebuilt. The west wall contains one similar window, as does the south wall which also contains another window cut in half. The east wall contains another similar window, a wider 19th-century copy of the original windows. At each corner of the church is a buttress. Around the rest of the church, other than along the east end, is a moulded string course at the level of the window sills. In the south wall is a doorway with a pointed arch that was rebuilt in the 20th century. Around the church are nine consecration cross stones. Each of these consists of a circle in which there are five holes which formerly held metal crosses.

== See also ==
- List of churches preserved by the Churches Conservation Trust in South East England
