= The Good Gardens Guide =

The Good Gardens Guide is a guide to gardens in the British Isles, published annually. Some of the gardens featured are not usually open to the public, and are only open by prior appointment with the owner.

Celebrity gardener Alan Titchmarsh endorsed the book, stating "I never go anywhere without it."
