= Houghton Lodge =

Country house in Houghton, Hampshire, England

Coordinates: 51.0963°N 1.5101°W

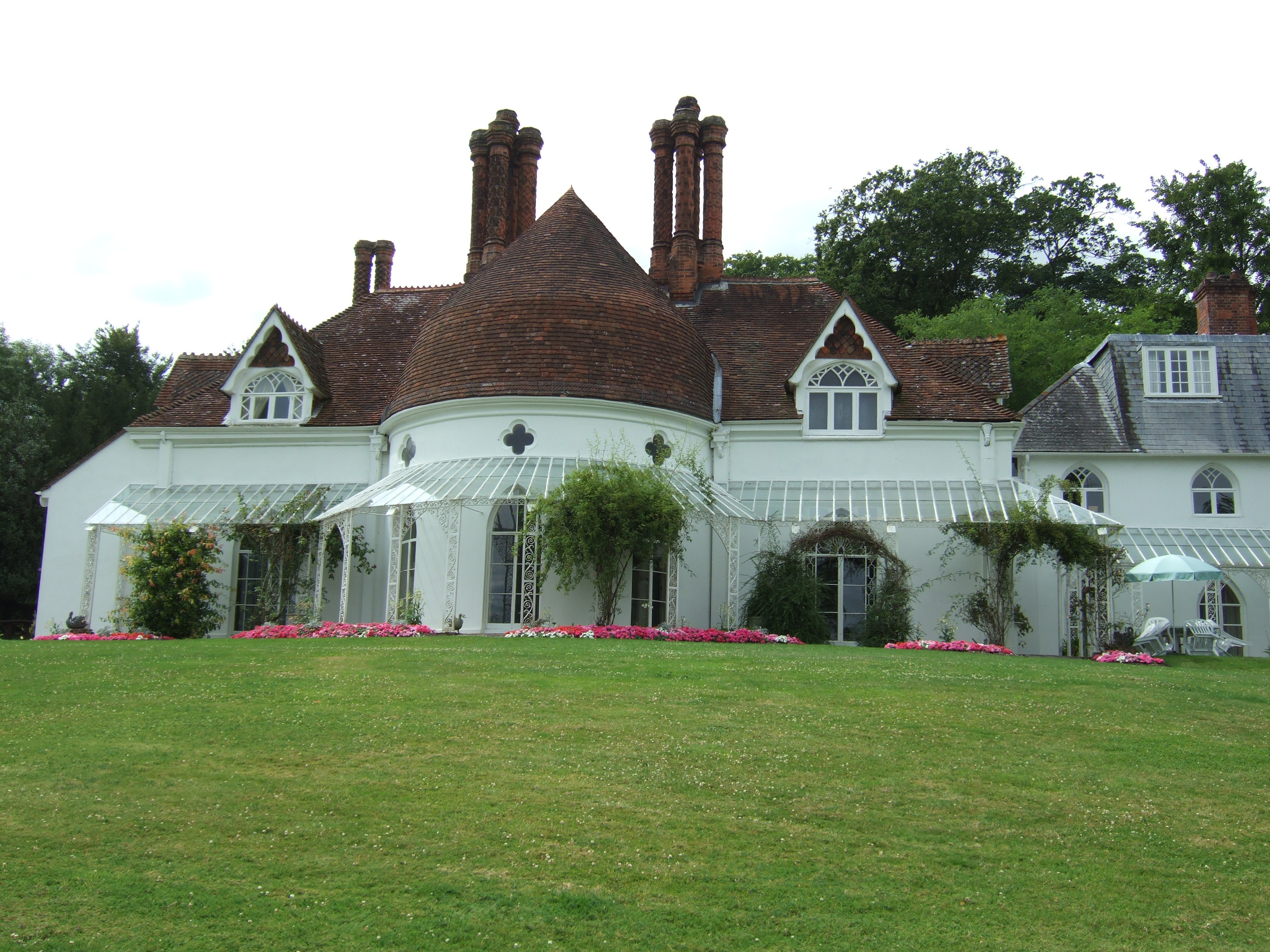
Houghton Lodge exemplifies the Cottage Ornée style. The reception rooms have french windows shaded by a verandah, while a servant wing (right) deliberately breaks the symmetry to provide informality.

Houghton Lodge is a Grade II* listed house on the River Test in Hampshire, England which was built in the 1790s, probably intended as a fishing lodge. The architect was more than likely John Plaw, a disciple of John Nash for the Barnard family. Houghton Lodge is England's finest surviving example of a Cottage Ornée.

== The house ==
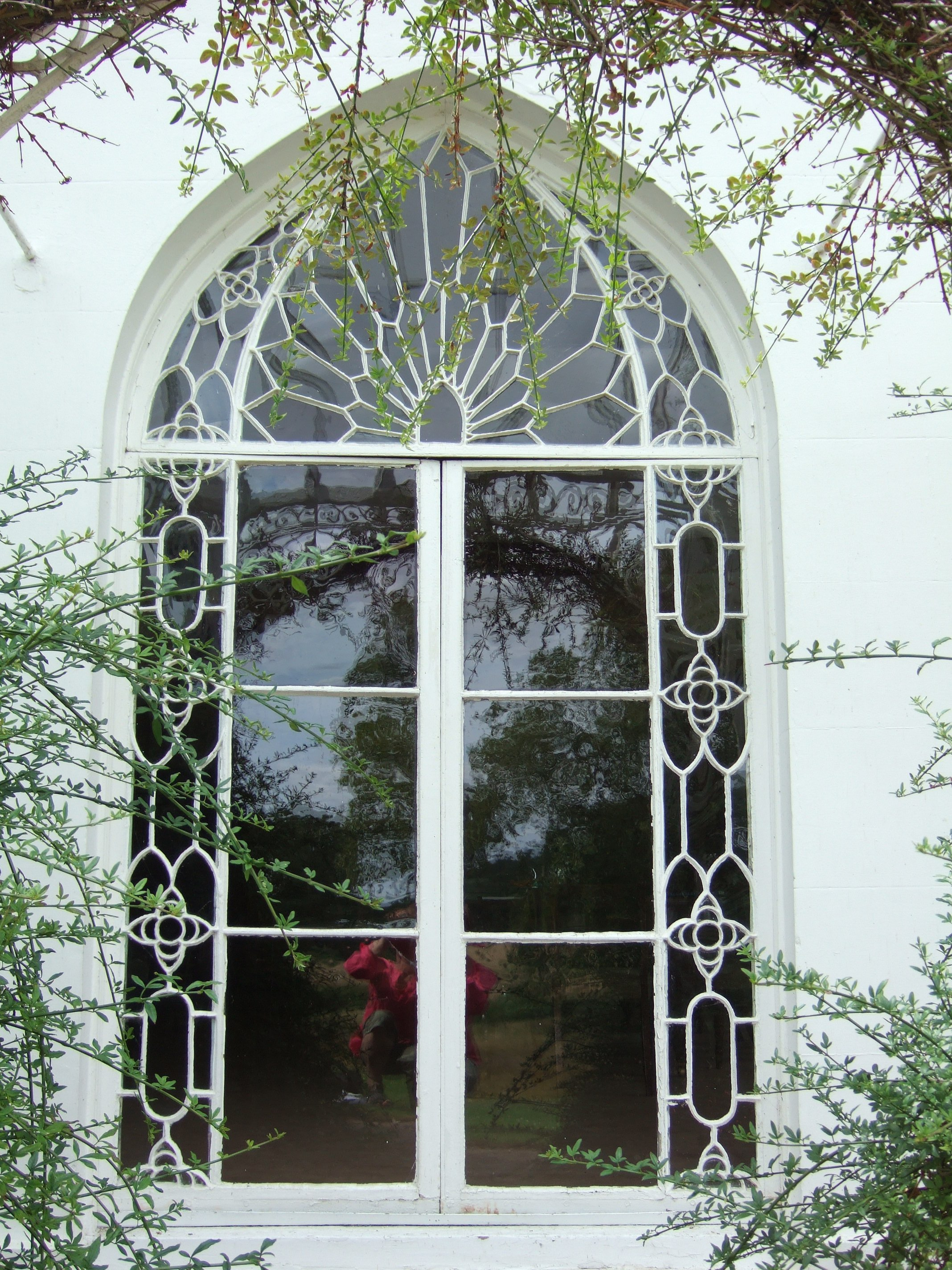
Many of Houghton's windows are in the exaggerated, decorative Gothic, almost Islamic, style which originated from the Walpole's Strawberry Hill Gothic.

The architecture of Houghton Lodge marks a period of informality in English architecture which begin in the 1770s and lasted until the 1830s. The antecedents of Houghton's style of architecture, known as cottage ornée, can be traced to the 'Strawberry Hill Gothic' style made popular by Horace Walpole at his fantasy castle at Strawberry Hill in the final quarter of the eighteenth century and further popularised by the writings of James Malton in his 1802 Essay on British Cottage Architecture.

During this period it became fashionable for the upper classes to enjoy country life due to the improvements in roads which made a visit to the country easier than it had been, allowing for shorter duration away from the more sophisticated entertainments to be found in London. For the first time a visit to the country became something to be enjoyed rather than endured. The new fashion extended to architecture and incorporated elements from the growing interest in the picturesque. Designs became more rustic, houses became lower and seemingly smaller, often at the expense of the servants comfort, as the still essential domestic quarters were forced out of sight, often underground or onto a separate wing of their own. It was this separate wing which led to the break in symmetry so rigorously enforced by the preceding diktats of architecture, thus complementing the contrived informality of the architecture.

Houghton Lodge exemplifies this cottage ornée style: the principal reception rooms are placed on the ground floor, rather than on a piano nobile. The reception rooms, typical of the style, have french windows, shaded by a verandah, allowing immediate access to the garden. Many of Houghton's windows are in the exaggerated, decorative Gothic, almost Islamic, style which originated from the Walpole's Strawberry Hill Gothic.

== The grounds ==
The estate sits on the west side of the River Test, with watermeadows in the eastern part of the estate. An area of 5 acres (20,000 m^{2}) of parks and lawns surround the house. A square planned grotto was built to the south west of the house in the early 19th century. Its brick vault and walls are entirely lined with flint nodules and it has small haphazard turrets in each corner. The grotto received a separate grade II listing in 1986.

The eighteenth century walled kitchen garden measures 95 m by 65 m, and is Grade II listed. The walls are rendered chalk cob, with greenhouses built against the west wall. A long herbaceous border flanks the exterior of the east wall. A topiary garden (known as the Peacock Garden) sits to the north of the house.

The estate has been owned by the Busk family since 1910. The watermeadows are designated an ESA (Environmentally Sensitive Area) and are managed appropriately, without the use of any fertilisers, herbicides or pesticides. A 15-acre (61,000 m^{2}) meadow walk has recently been developed here. The grounds are open to visitors between 1 April and 30 September, but the house is only open by prior appointment to organised groups. There is an on-site tearoom and 6 units of tourist accommodation in a converted calf byre which opened in 2018.

The house and grounds have been used as filming locations for the film Wilde, and the television adaptations of David Copperfield, The Buccaneers and Murder at the Vicarage.

== Gallery ==
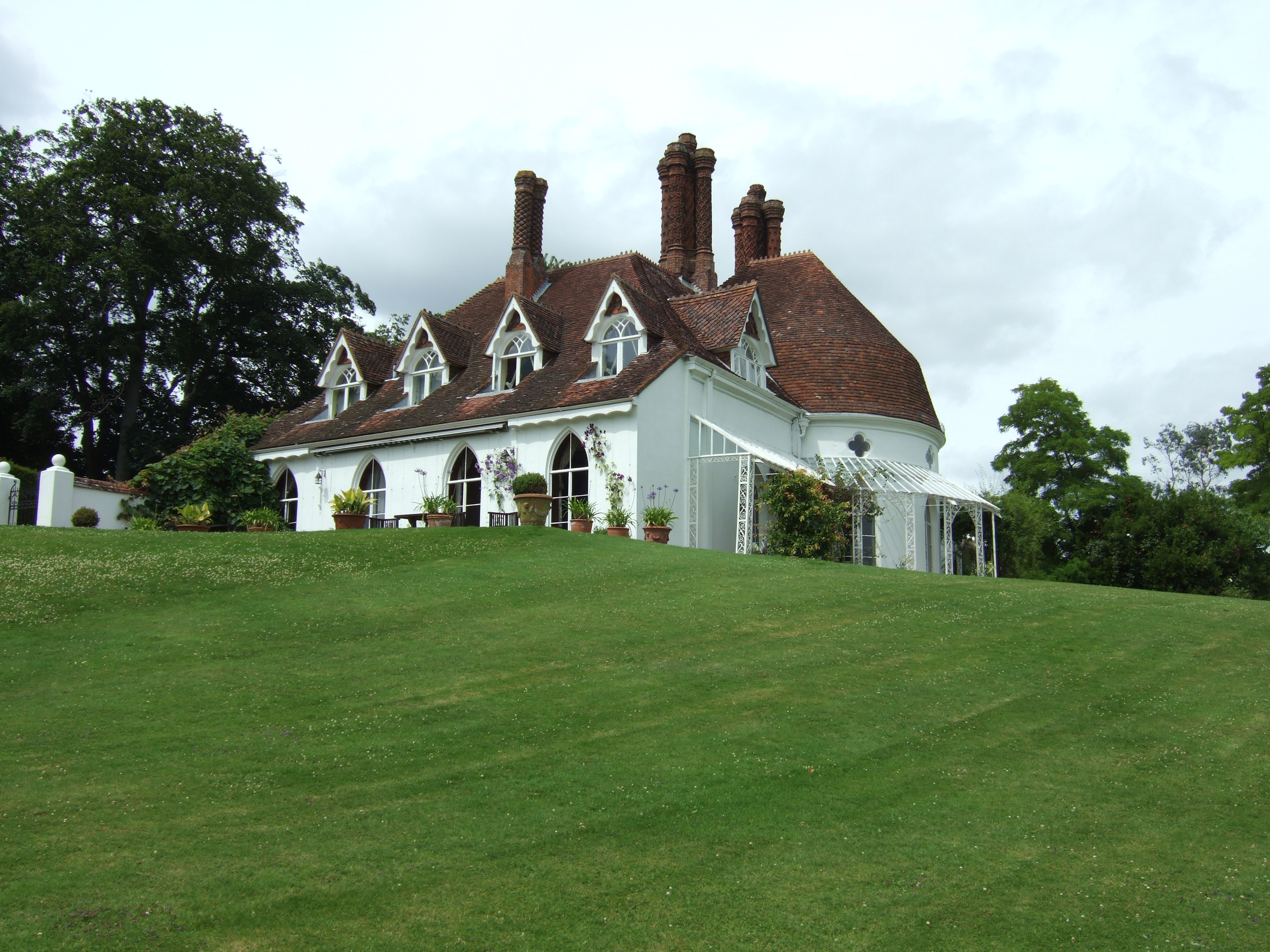

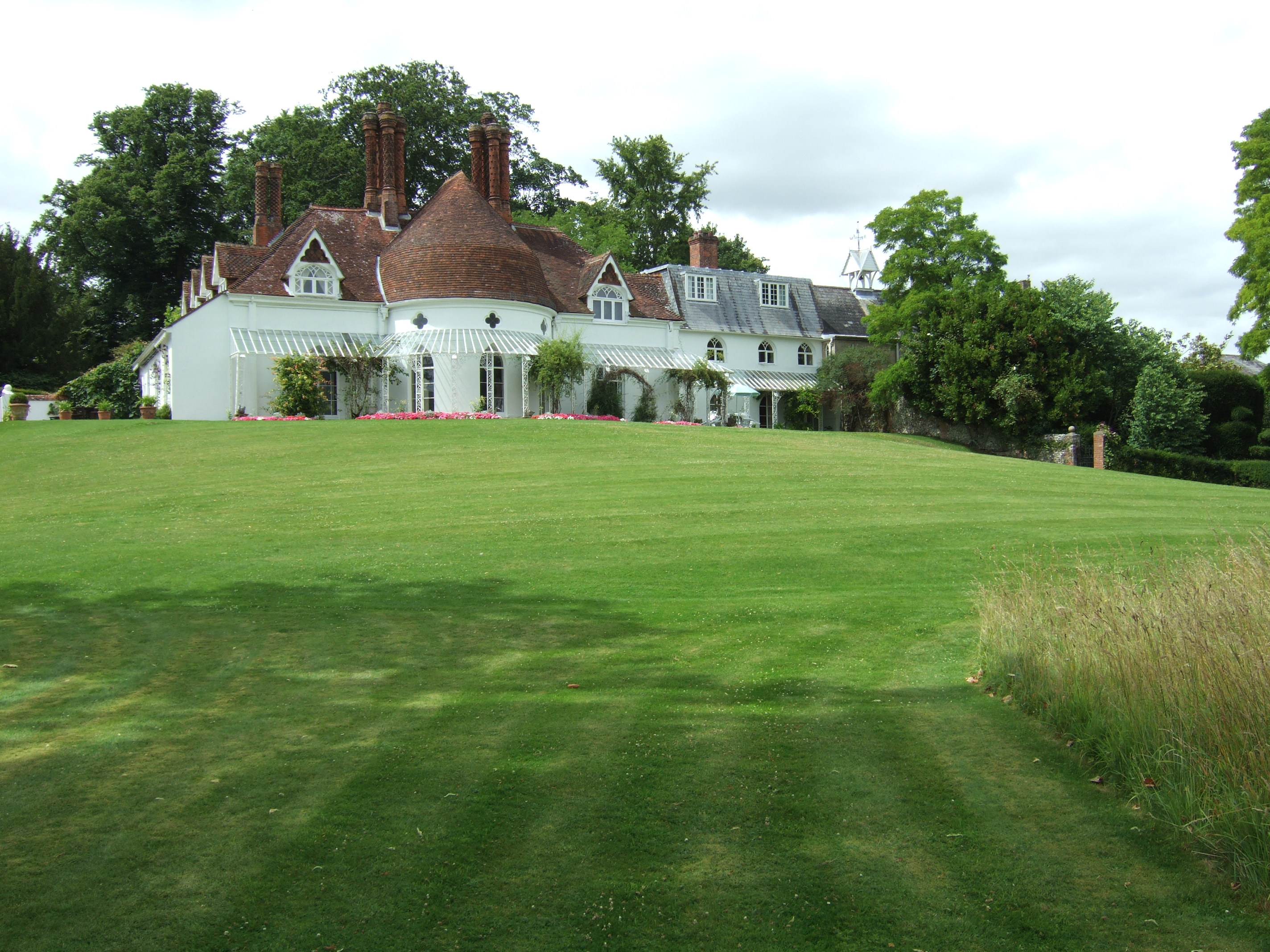

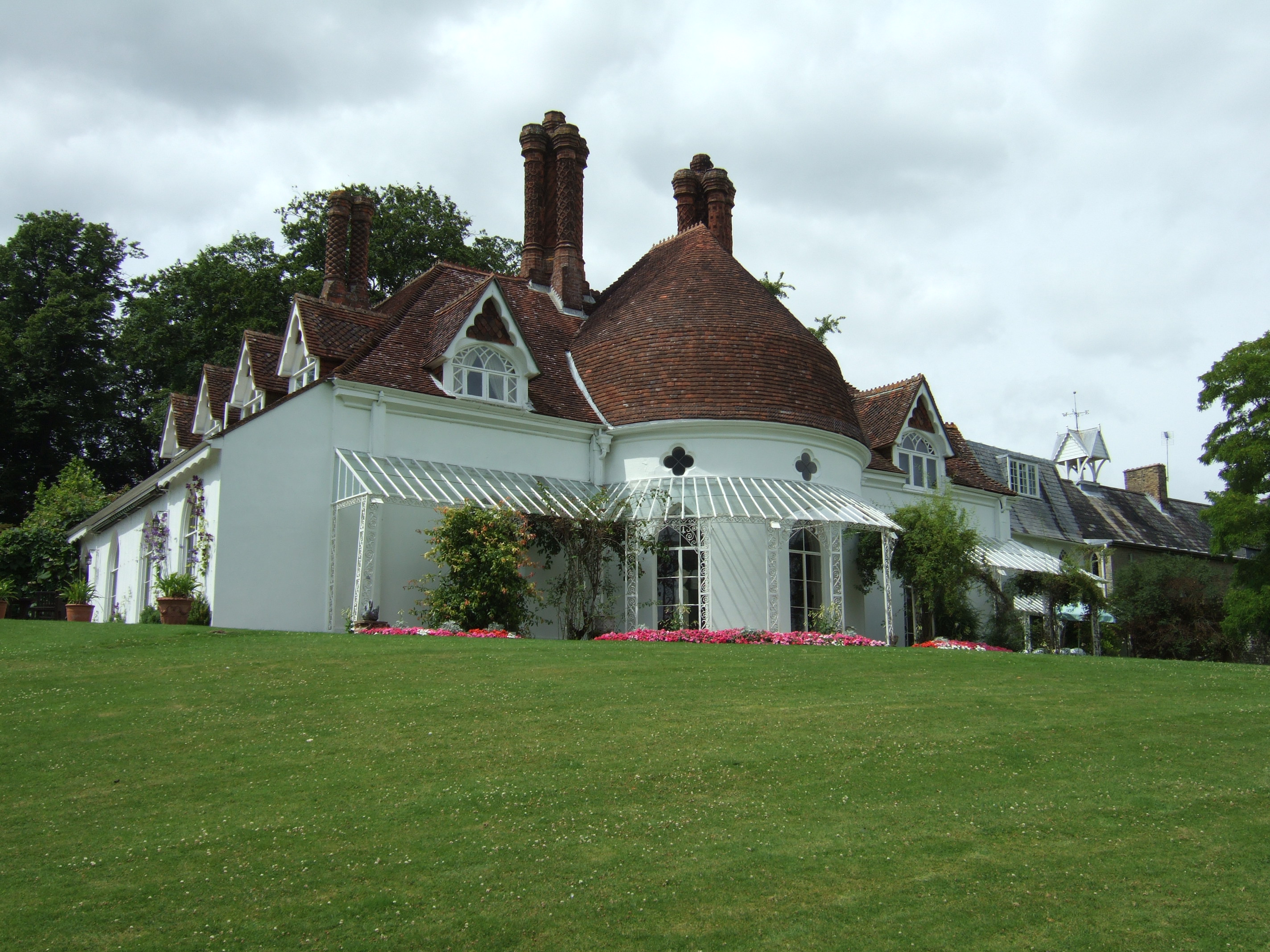

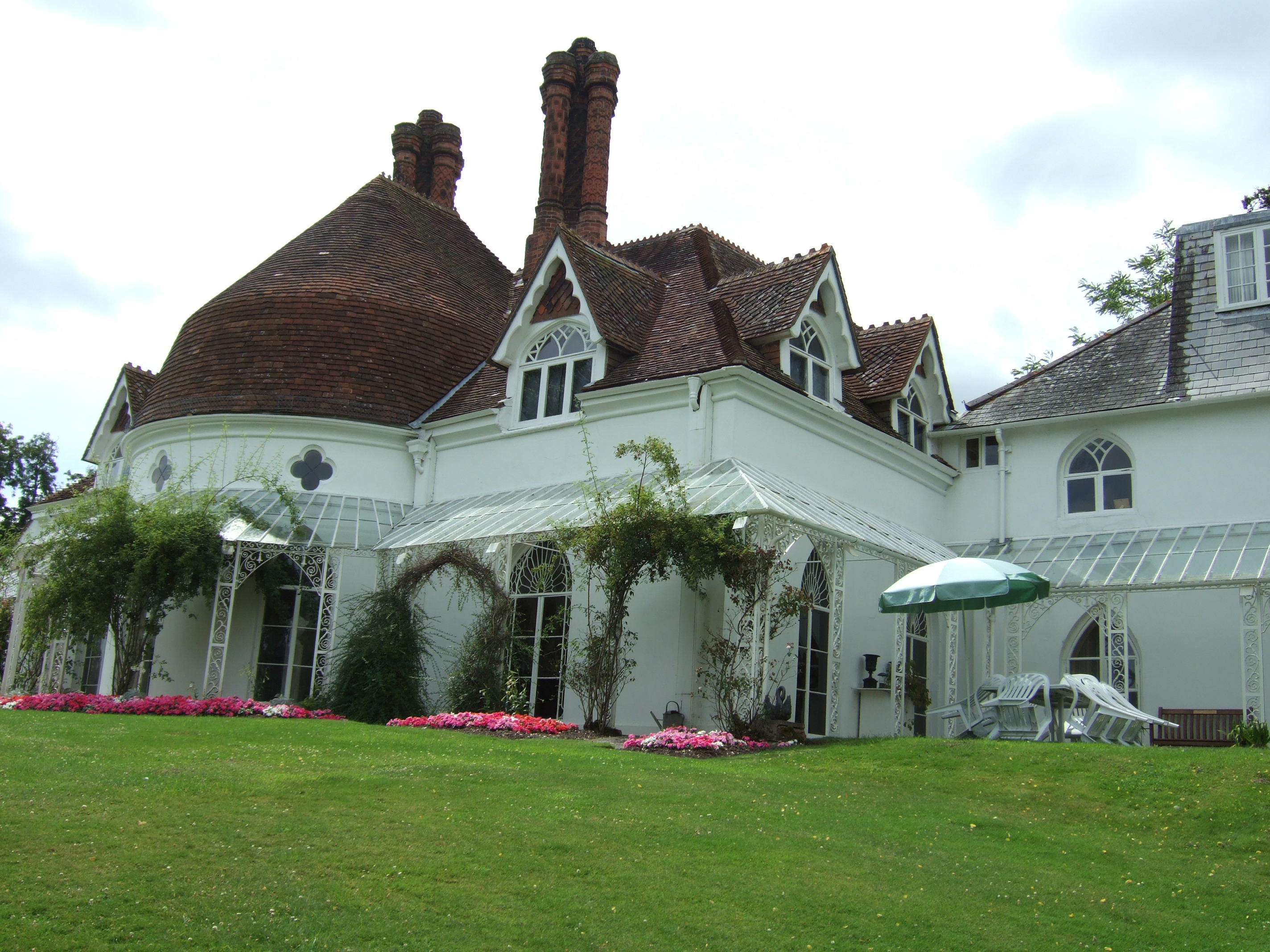

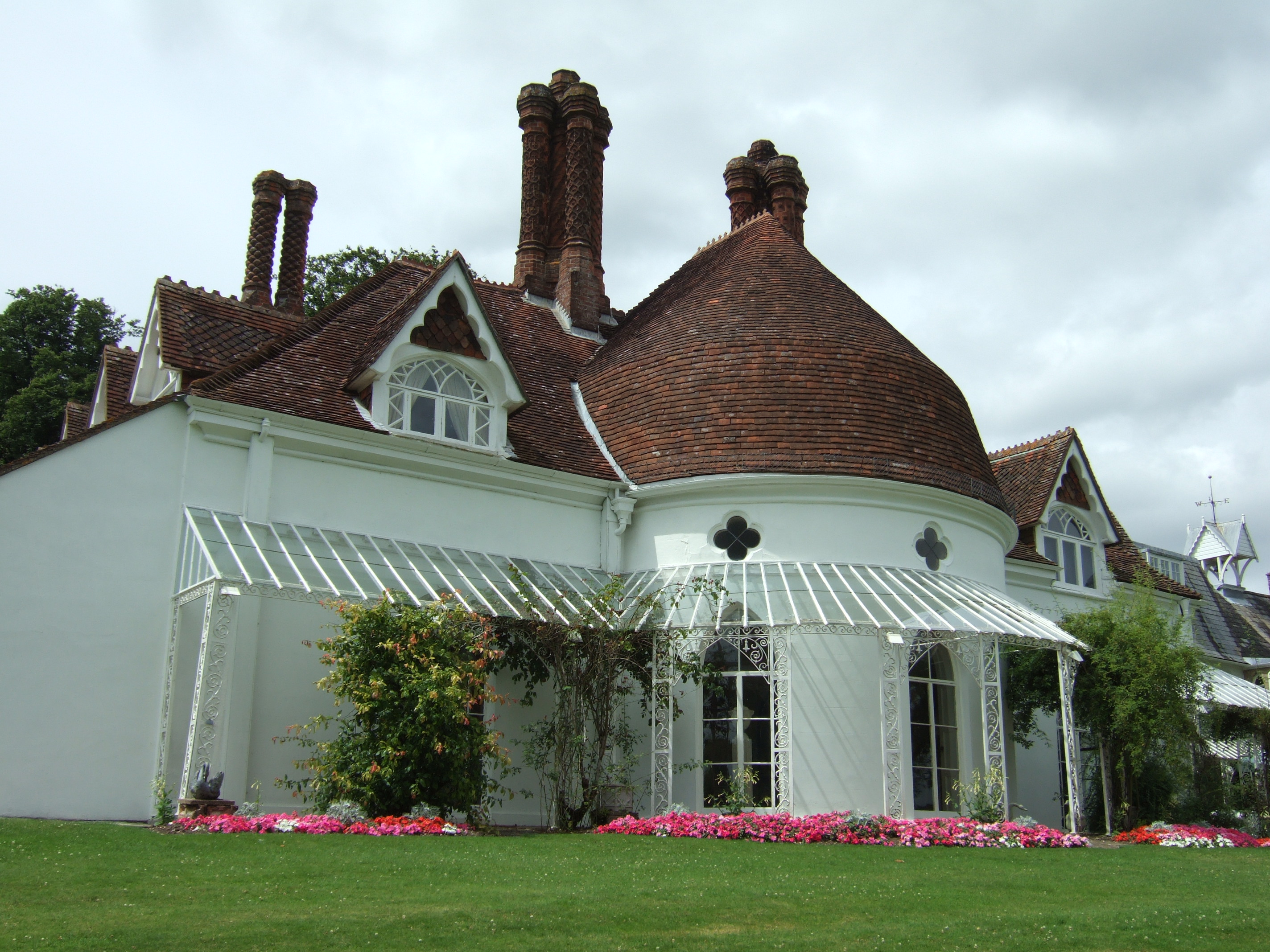

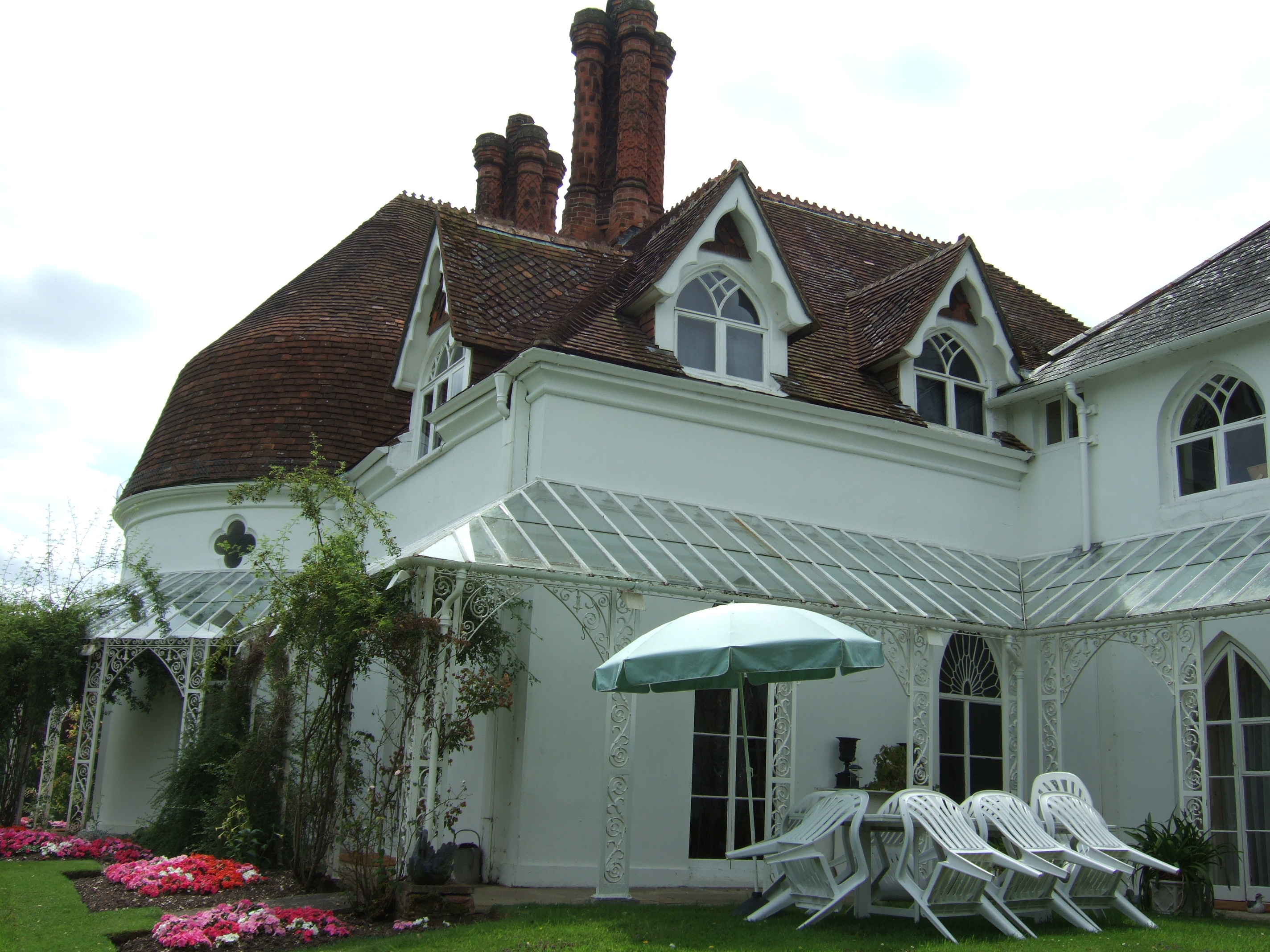

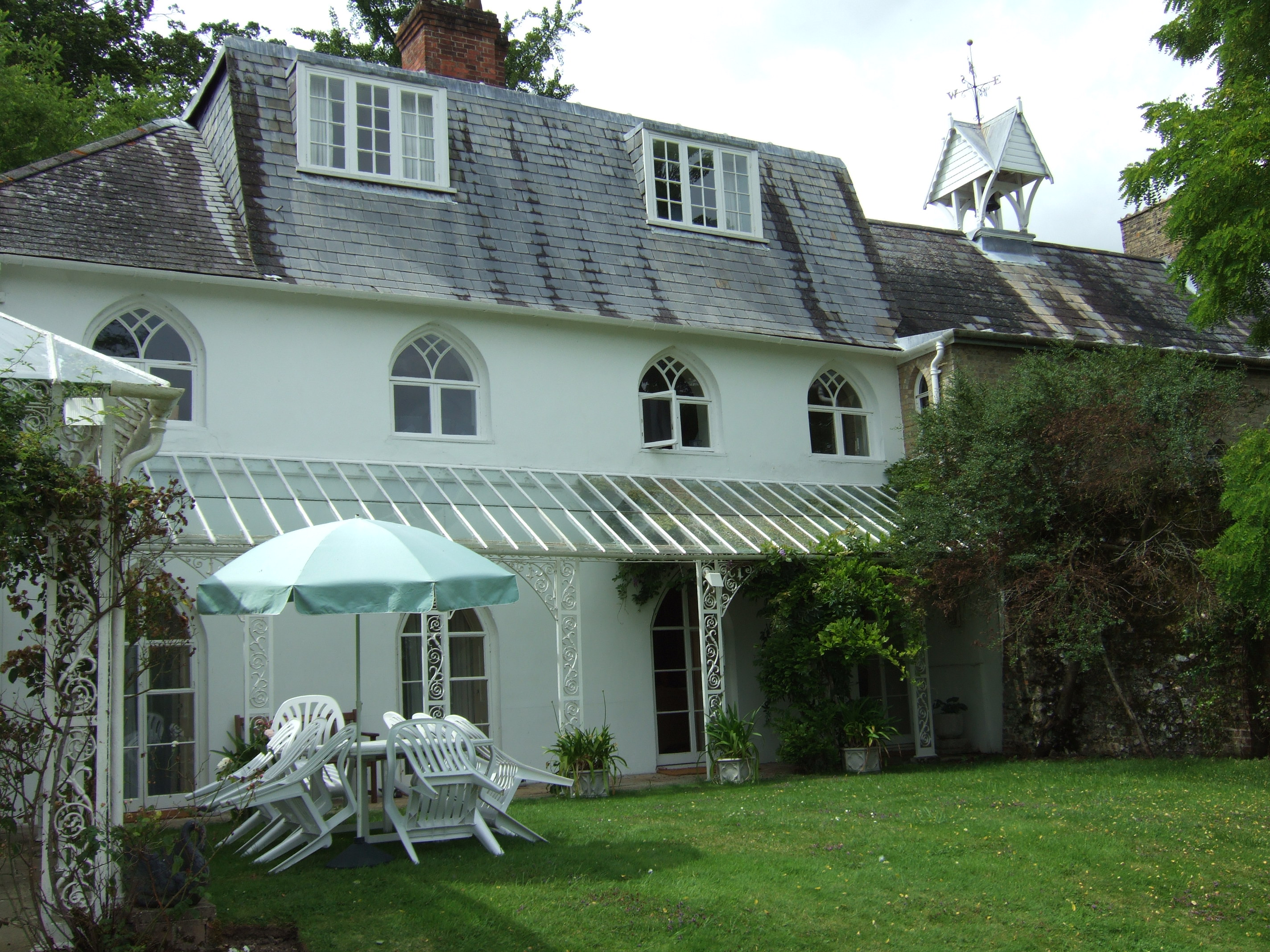

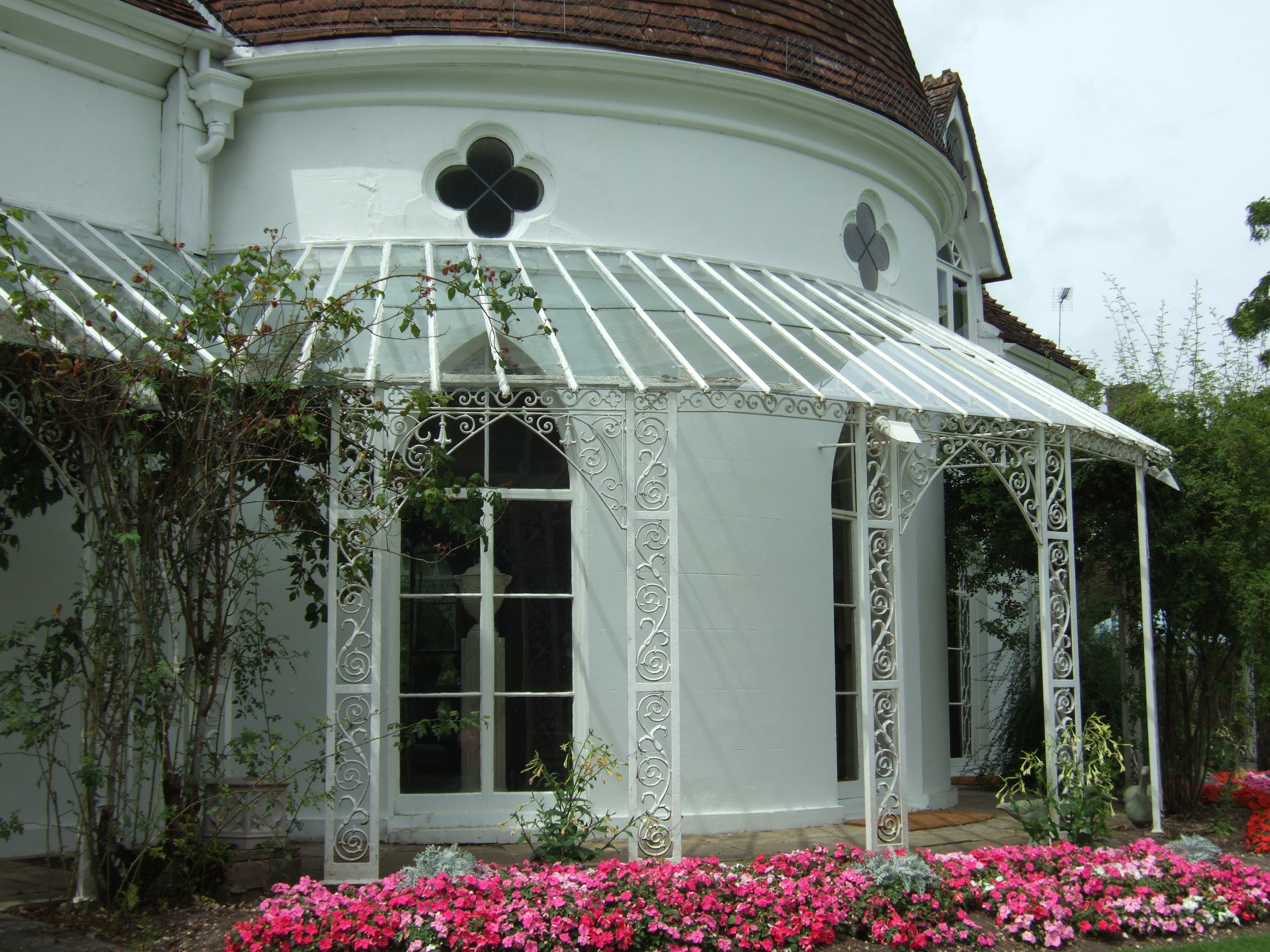

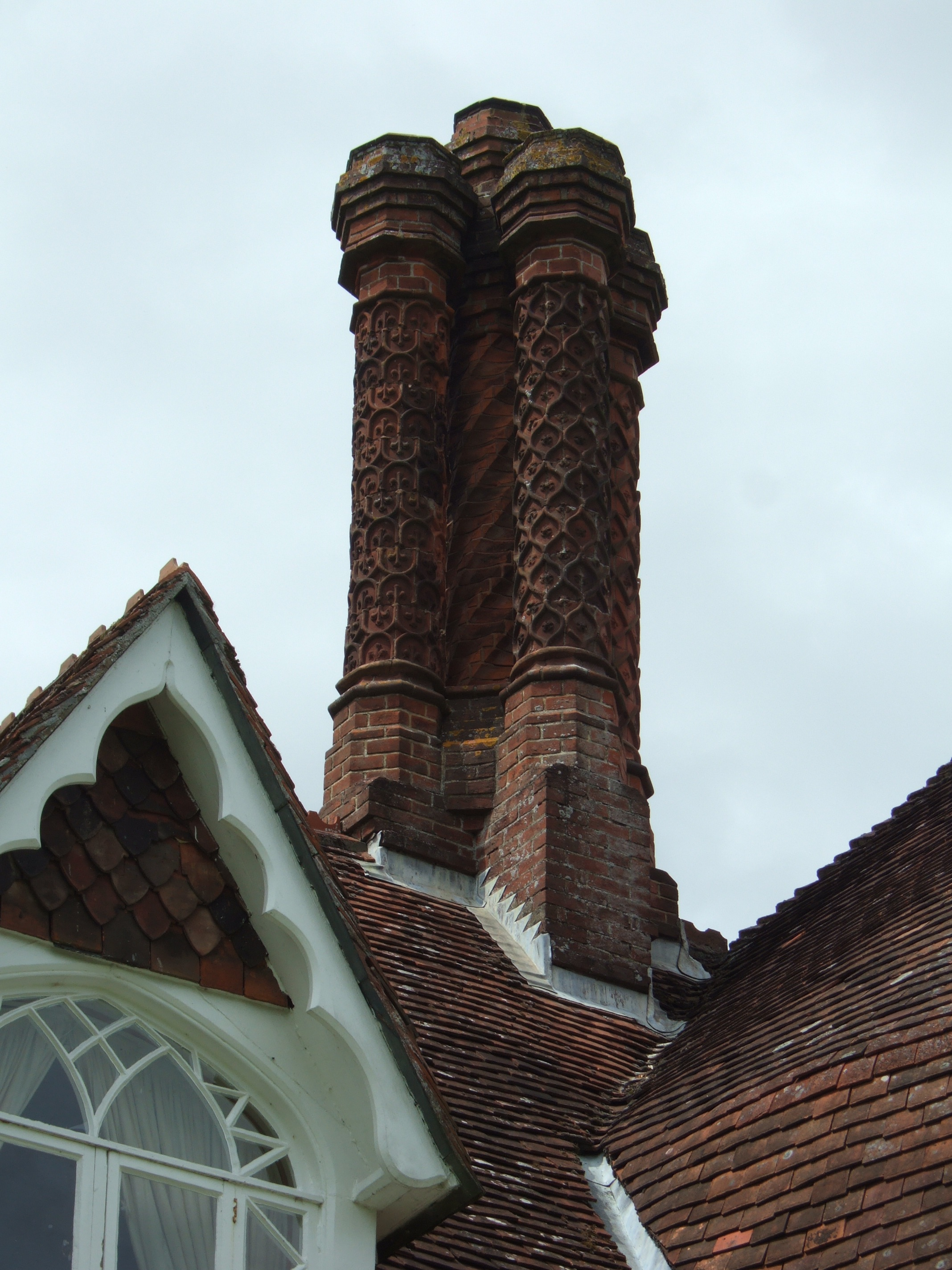

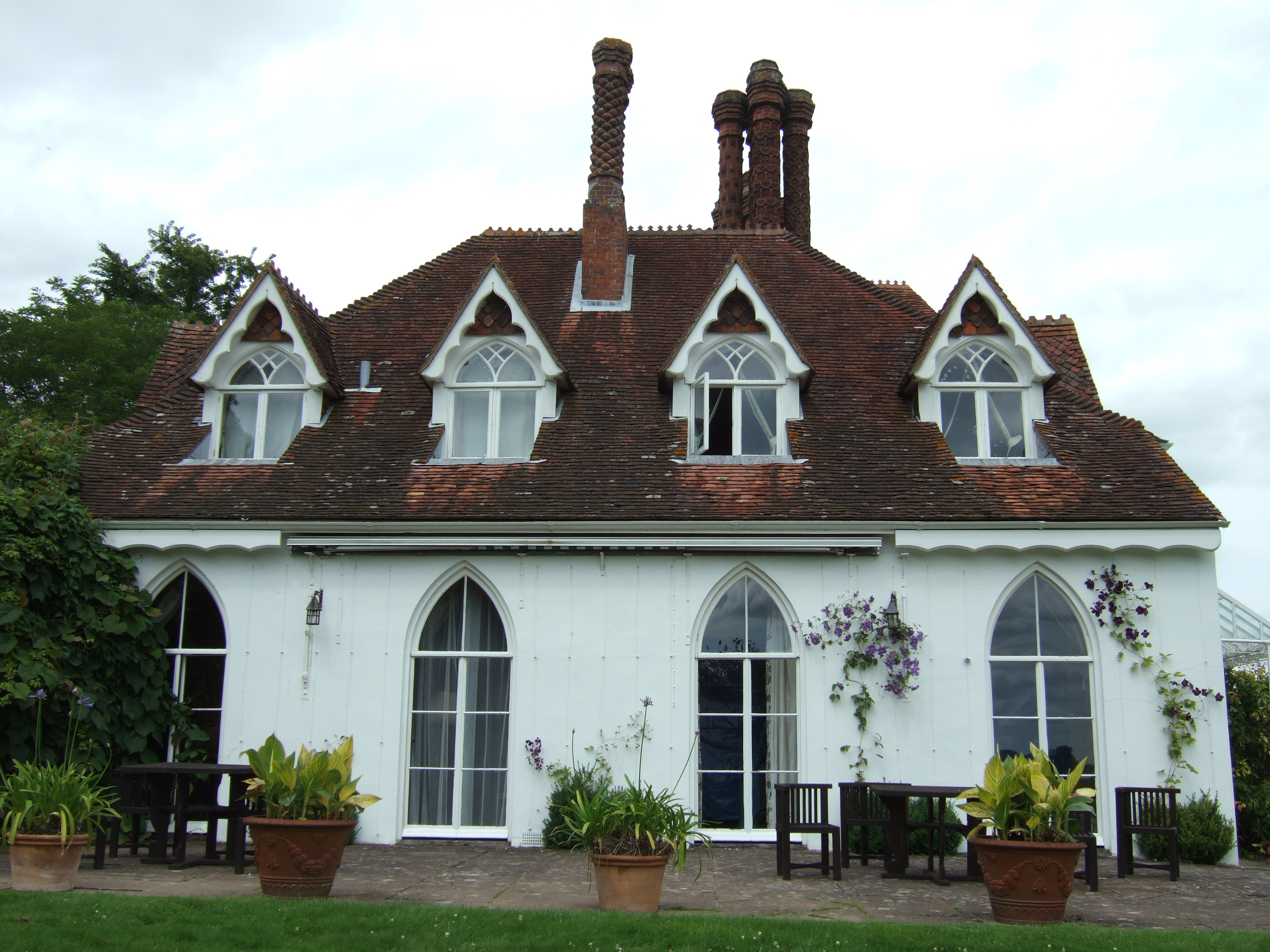

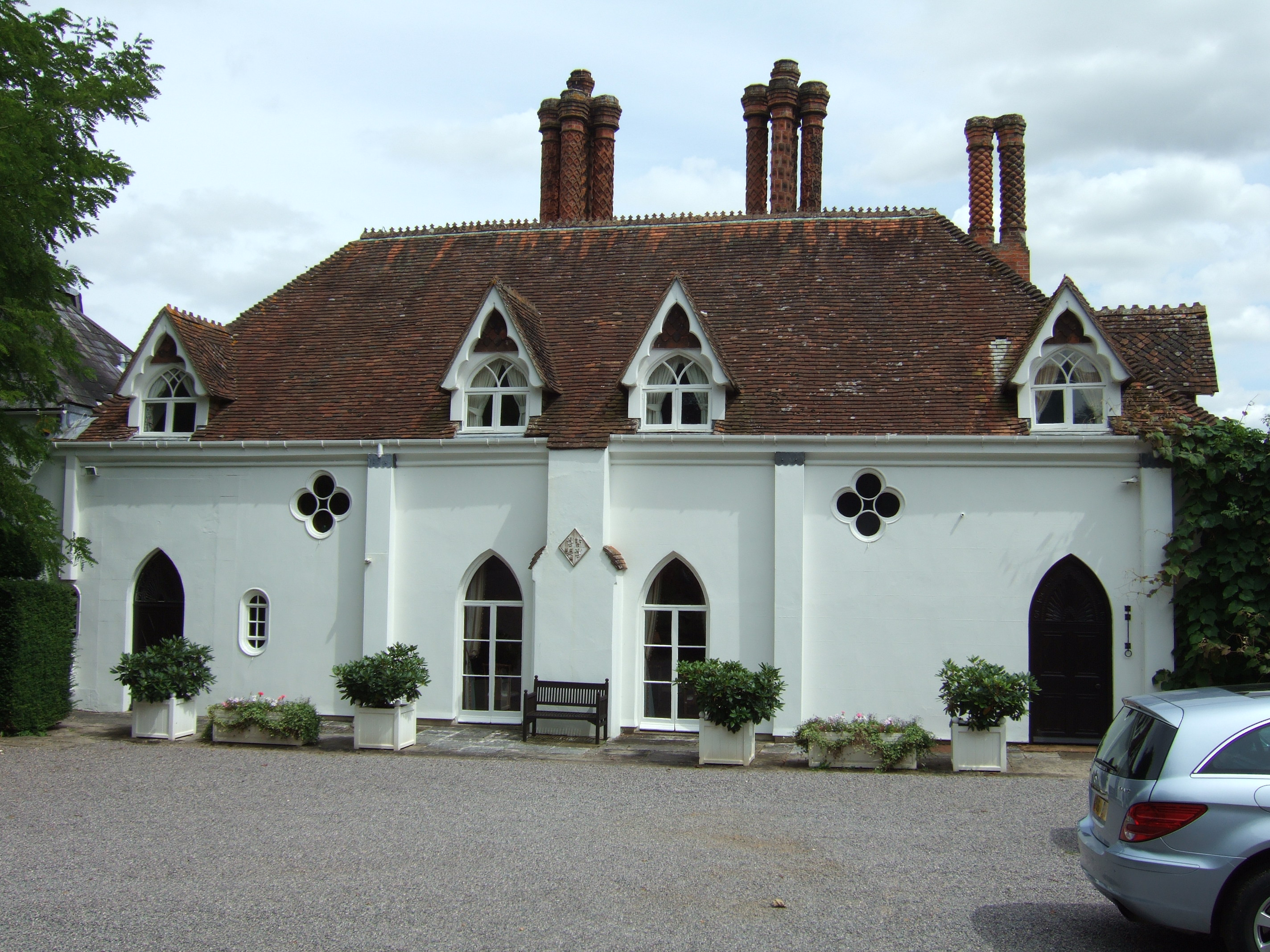

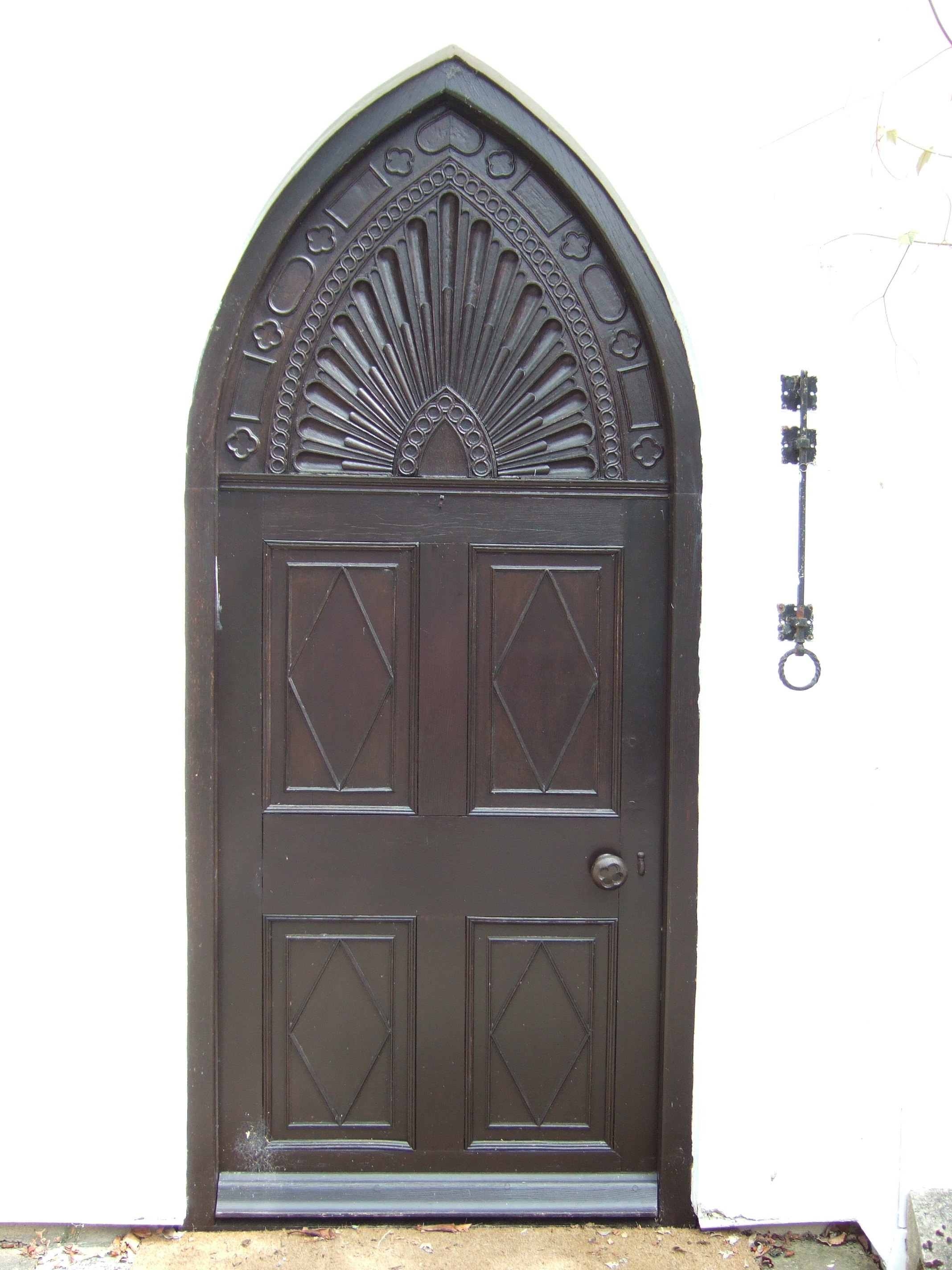

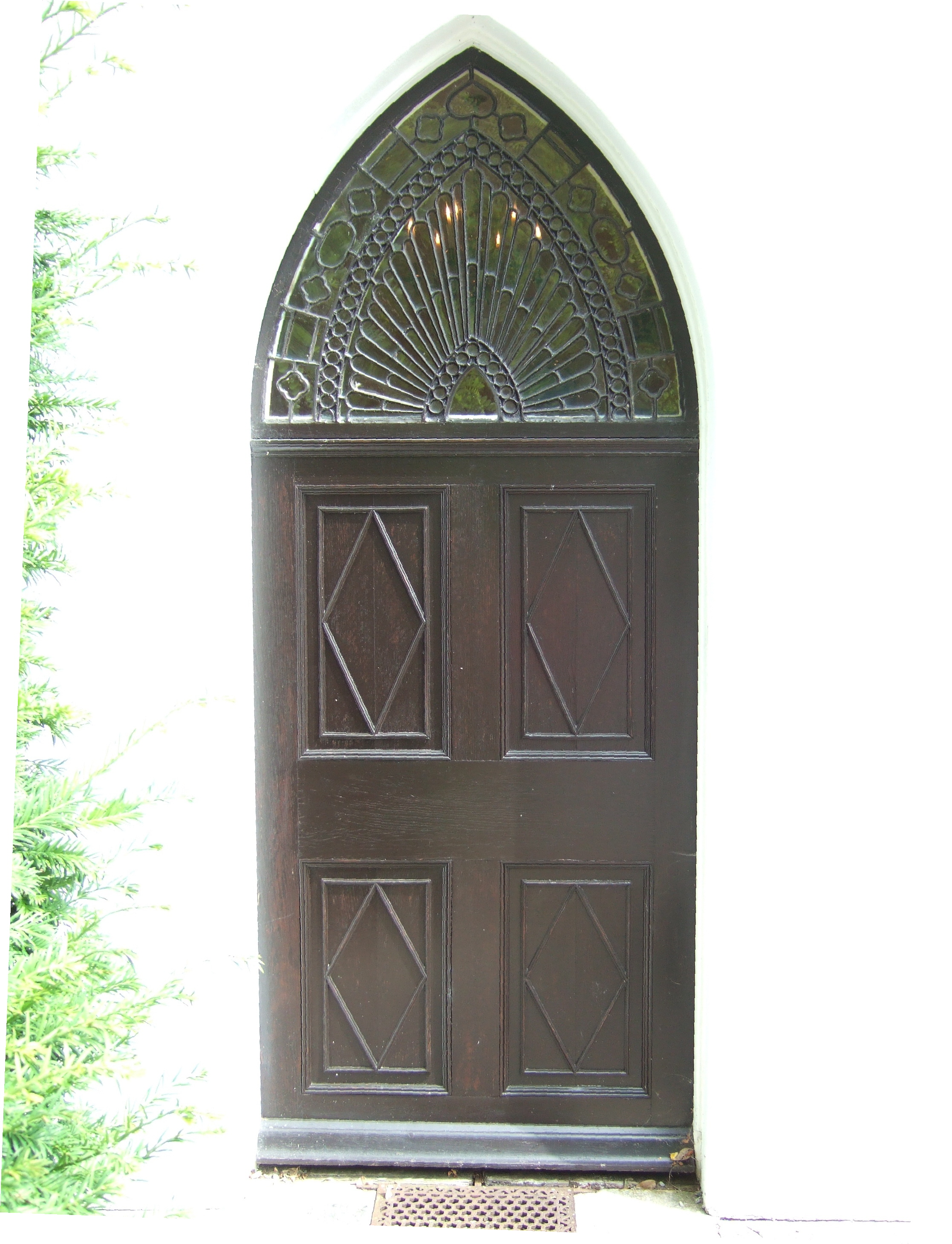

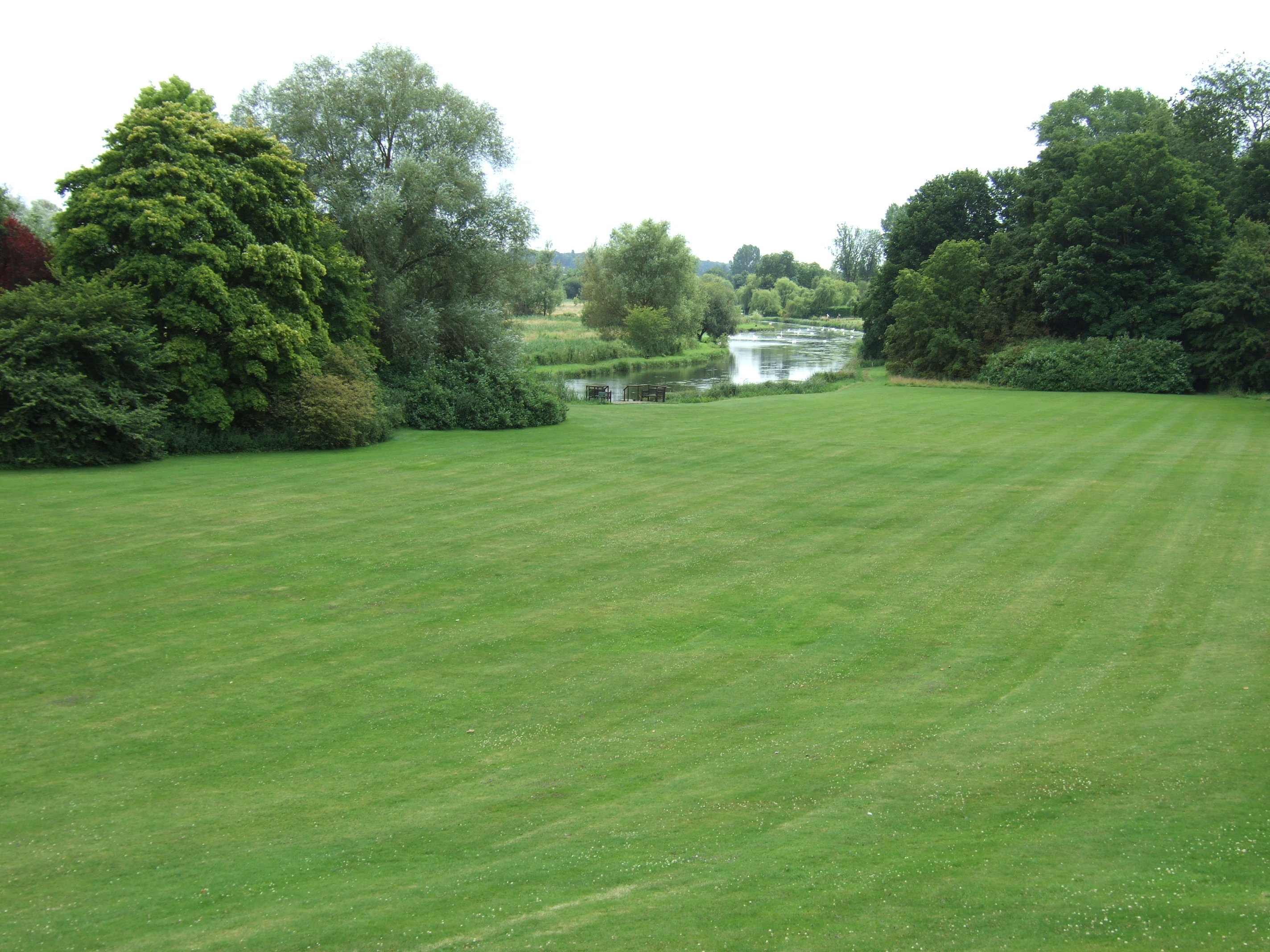
