= Stockbridge, Hampshire =

Town in Hampshire, England

Coordinates: 51.114003°N 1.490646°W

Stockbridge
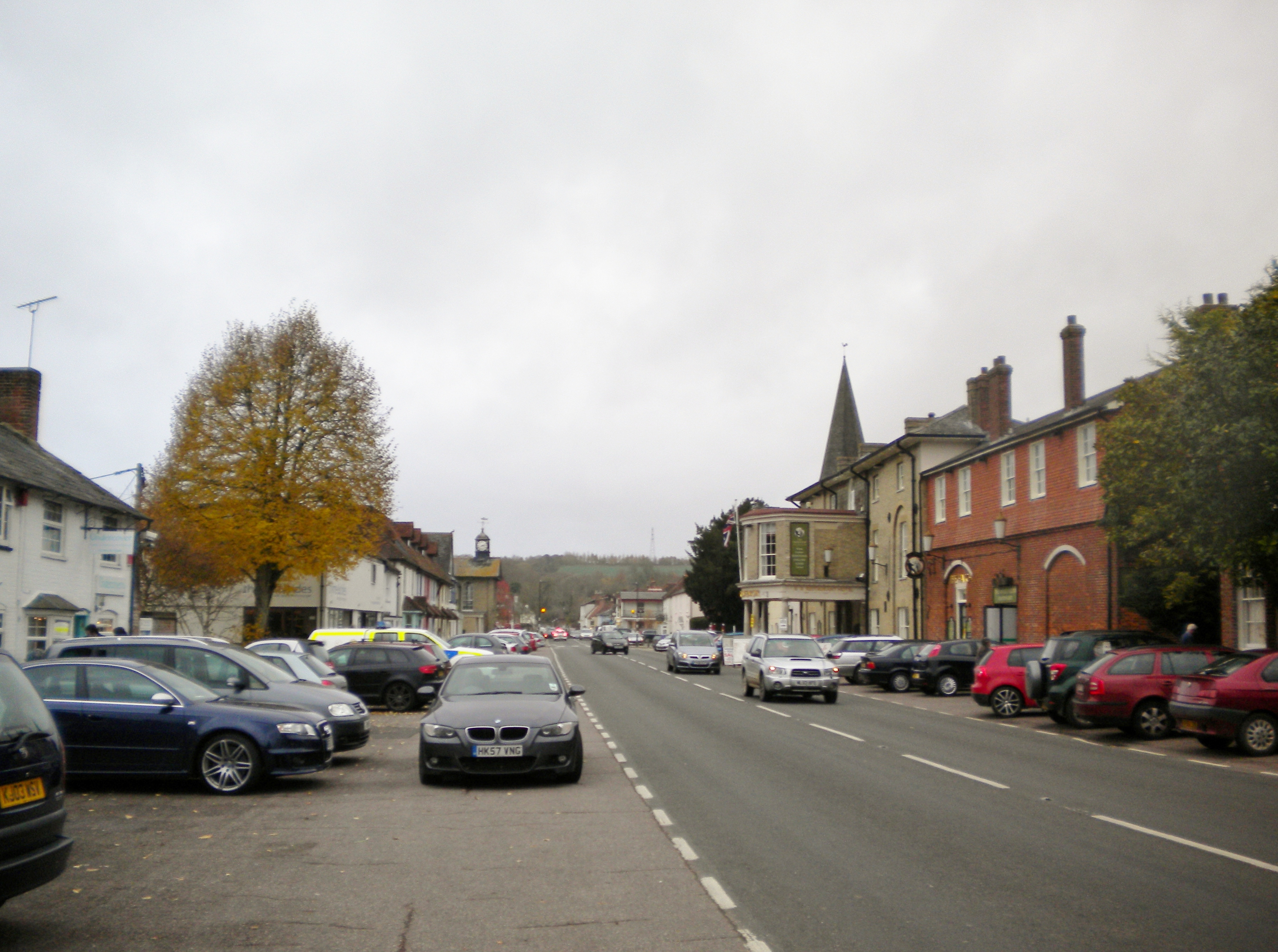
- Stockbridge High Street looking west

- Location within Hampshire
- Population: 579 (2021 census)
- OS grid reference: SU355351
- Civil parish: Stockbridge
- District: Test Valley
- Shire county: Hampshire
- Region: South East
- Country: England
- Sovereign state: United Kingdom
- Post town: Stockbridge
- Postcode district: SO20
- Dialling code: 01264
- Police: Hampshire and Isle of Wight
- Fire: Hampshire and Isle of Wight
- Ambulance: South Central
- UK Parliament: Romsey and Southampton North
- Website: stockbridgeparishcouncil.gov.uk

Stockbridge is a town and civil parish in the Test Valley district of Hampshire, England. It had a population of 579 at the 2021 census. It sits astride the River Test and at the foot of Stockbridge Down.

== Geography ==
The town is situated on the A30 road, which once carried most of the traffic from London to Dorset, south Somerset, Devon and Cornwall in the South West, though today this route is less important than the A303 dual carriageway to the north. Salisbury is 15 miles (24 km) by road; Winchester is 8.3 miles (13.4 km) by the B3049 road that joins the A30 nearby. The town's long high street was thus on a useful route between the two medieval cathedral cities. The town's civil parish has an area of 1,323 acres (535 ha).

The town's street crosses the River Test, marking the border of the parishes of Stockbridge and Longstock by a low bridge of three arches rebuilt and widened in 1799. Five smaller river channels flow through the town. For a brief time, to provide space for fish, these were split into eight artificial ditches just above the town.

The town is on a shared pedestrian/footpath, the Test Way.

== History ==
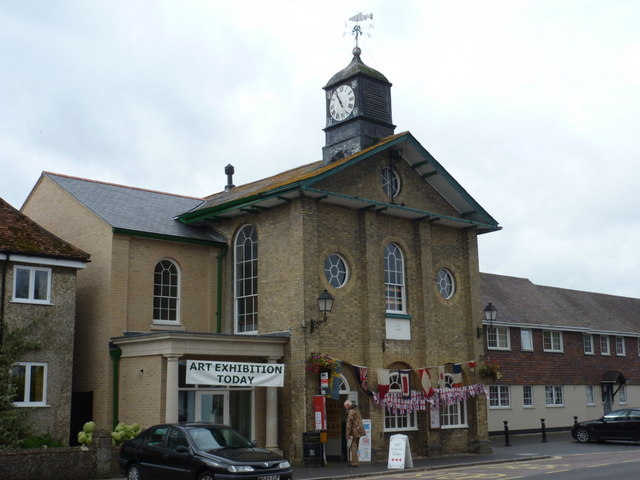
Stockbridge Town Hall

The place-name 'Stockbridge' first appears in Charter Rolls of 1239 as Stocbrigge. In Inquisitiones post mortem of 1258 it appears as Stokbregg. The name means 'stock bridge', referring to a bridge constructed from stocks (meaning 'tree trunks').

Stockbridge witnessed the capture of Robert of Gloucester by William of Ypres in 1141. Edward I stayed in Stockbridge in August 1294, as did the last Catholic King, James II, on his way to Salisbury to meet the forces of the Prince of Orange. He dined at the Swan Inn in November 1688, which still exists.

The right to hold a market was awarded to the town (as the parcel known as The Street in King's Somborne manor) before 1190 in Richard I's reign, reviewed and confirmed in 1200, and extended to an annual three-day fair by Henry III. As in the 12th century, the town consists almost wholly of one long wide street and it is to this characteristic that it owed its early name of Le Street. The town grew and prospered as an unincorporated mesne borough before, probably by plague, the place became almost deserted and the poverty of the remaining inhabitants was so great that the market which had been confirmed to the town by Henry V and Henry VI was discontinued.

By the mid-Tudor era, under Edward VI, the wealthy burgages numbered 58, partly in consequence of this, in 1562 two members of parliament were granted. Charles I had confirmed the right to annual fairs in 1641, however during the start of the nineteenth century a marked decline in trade was noted at the three increasingly agricultural fairs, with one continuing until after 1911 The population of the parish was 853 in 1871, with 185 inhabited houses.

=== Manor ===
In the medieval centuries passed as a mentioned part and parcel of King's Somborne manor, not specifically in that manor at Domesday but likely as there was mention of the manor here specifically being in Richard I's time, as when they were forfeited to the crown when Henry IV (of Lancaster) took the throne, in 1402.

Then it was let which gave rents of assizes to various men, including to Joseph Foster Barham, MP, on whose death in 1832, it went to his wife who married the Earl of Clarendon to hold for their son; then sold to George G. Maitland then to Charles Warner then to Francis Hardinge and then to the more nationally famous person mentioned below. One of the mills belonged to the lord of Leckford Abbotts in 1548

== Governance and politics ==
Stockbridge is a civil parish with a parish council of nine elected members.

At the lower tier of local government, Stockbridge is in Test Valley district. For elections to the district council it is in Mid Test electoral ward.

At the upper tier of local government, Stockbridge is in Hampshire non-metropolitan county. For elections to the county council it is in Test Valley Central electoral division.

=== Administrative history ===
Historically, Stockbridge was in the hundred of Kings Somborne until 1836. when it became part of Thorngate hundred. In 1894, the rural district of Stockbridge was created, but this was merged to form Romsey and Stockbridge Rural District in 1932. In 1974, the rural district was abolished and Stockbridge became part of the newly-created Test Valley district.

Stockbridge constituency elected two members to the unreformed House of Commons – Elizabeth I granted the two members of parliament in 1562; elections proved corrupted and a private Bill for the disfranchisement of the borough was introduced in 1693, rejected at the Third Reading. In 1714, Richard Steele, one of the MPs (see Stockbridge) was forced out for bribery and writing seditious pamphlets. The Reform Act 1832 resulted in its end as a rotten borough.

== Demographics ==
At the 2021 census, Stockbridge civil parish had a population of 579 people in 309 households.

Census population of Stockbridge parish
Census	Population	Female	Male	Households	Source
2001	581	321	260	294	
2011	592	303	289	310	
2021	579	305	274	309	

== Landmarks ==
Name	Grade of listing	Century
Fairways The Grosvenor Hotel (frontage protrudes further than the others)	II*	19th and an 18th cottage
The Old Town Hall	II*	18th, 19th and 20th
Remains of Old Church	II*	cusp of 13th and 14th
Kings Head House/Lane House (includes Residence, Antiques and Salon)	II*	17th, 18th and 19th
The Old Rectory	II	19th
Waterlow	II	16th and 18th
The Old Three Cups Hotel	II	17th, 18th and 20th
Elizabeth Viney Antiques/John Robertson, Butchers	II	17th, 18th, 19th and new glazing/door
J and L Inglis Stables of Vine Inn	II	18th and 19th
Vine Inn	II	18th and 19th
Mulberry	II	18th and 19th
Stokes Restaurant (formerly N J Stokes Garage)	II	19th, see famous people.
Stockbridge Motors, The Cottage	II	17th, 18th and 19th
Stockbridge Antiques / Stockbridge Pharmacy / Trout Cottage	II	18th, 19th and 20th
Stockbridge War Memorial	II	20th
Sheriff House Hotel	II	18th and 19th
White Hart Inn	II	18th and 19th
Seven Gables	II	18th, part 20th
Leet Cottage / The Greyhound	II	18th, part 19th
Manor House	II	16th, 17th, 18th and refronted 19th
Touchwood	II	18th and 20th
Church of St Peter	II	19th but some windows 13th and 15th

=== Religious buildings ===
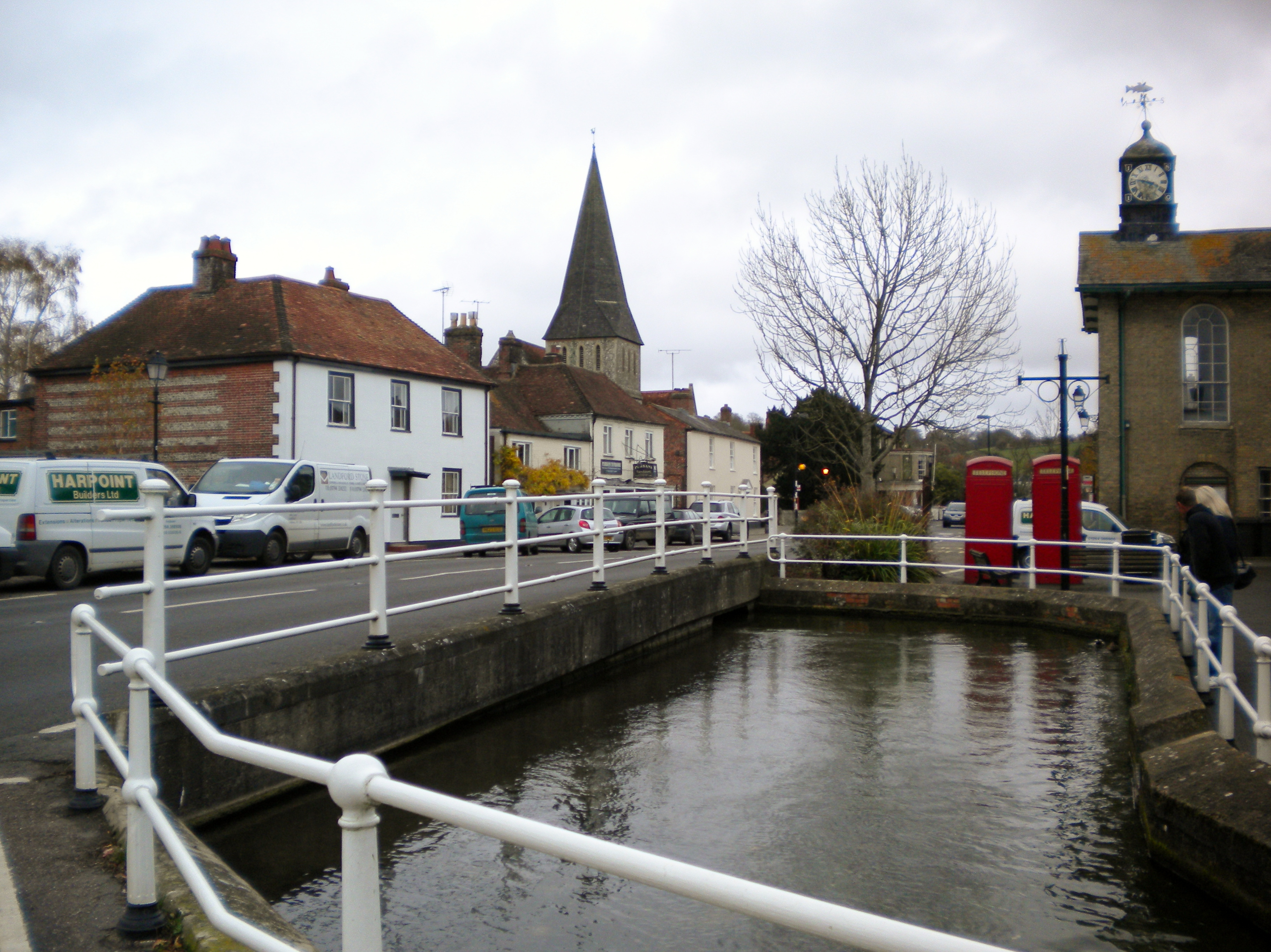
One of the branches of the River Test which flow under the High Street with the spire of St Peter's in the background

Only the chancel measuring about 8 metres by 5 metres, some of the windows (Note: 12th-century date. One of these windows, serving as the west window of the north aisle, is of two lancet lights with a circular light over and an external label with grotesque animal drips) and the graveyard survive of the original parish church at the eastern end of the town, now known as Old St Peter's Church. A licence to give divine service from 1323 to 1333 was given to John Fromond, architecturally this places about a century after the likely building of the church's chancel. A Victorian Gothic church, St Peter's, designed by J Colson, was built in 1866 at a central location in the High Street. The Roman Catholic church of St Thomas More is a modern brick built hall off of the High Street near Stockbridge Town Hall.

== Transport ==
Stockbridge railway station was on the Andover & Redbridge Railway (colloquially the Sprat and Winkle Line), later a branch line of the LSWR. This closed in 1967 under the Beeching cuts.

== Education ==
Stockbridge has a state primary school, and a secondary scool, Test Valley School.

== Media ==
Local news and television programmes are provided by BBC South and ITV Meridian. Television signals are received from either Hannington TV transmitter or Rowridge TV transmitter.

The town is served by both BBC Radio Berkshire and BBC Radio Solent. Other local radio stations including Heart South, Capital South, Easy Radio South Coast, Nation Radio South Coast and Greatest Hits Radio Berkshire & North Hampshire.

Local newspapers are Andover Advertiser and Hampshire Chronicle.

== Sport and leisure ==
Due to its hatchery south of the town and many channels, Stockbridge is renowned for trout fishing. One of the UK's most exclusive clubs, described by Country Life as the dream of every fly-fisher, with exclusive fishing rights over 13 miles of prime trout breeding and fishing waters, the Houghton Fishing Club founded in 1822, for many years met socially at The Grosvenor Hotel, a current landmark by its jutting out into the pavement.

Stockbridge has a Non-League football club Stockbridge F.C., who were founded in 1894 and play at The Recreation Ground in the town.

== Notable residents ==
- Hicks Withers-Lancashire was lord of the manor from the 1890s until 1902, when it was sold to Mr R. P. Attenborough.
- Lillie Langtry, actress, producer and socialite, lived at the property that is now NJ Stokes Garage.
- Varyl Begg, Admiral of the Fleet and First Sea Lord, had his home in Stockbridge
