= Hurstbourne railway station =

Former railway station in England

Coordinates: 51.2394°N 1.3815°W

Hurstbourne
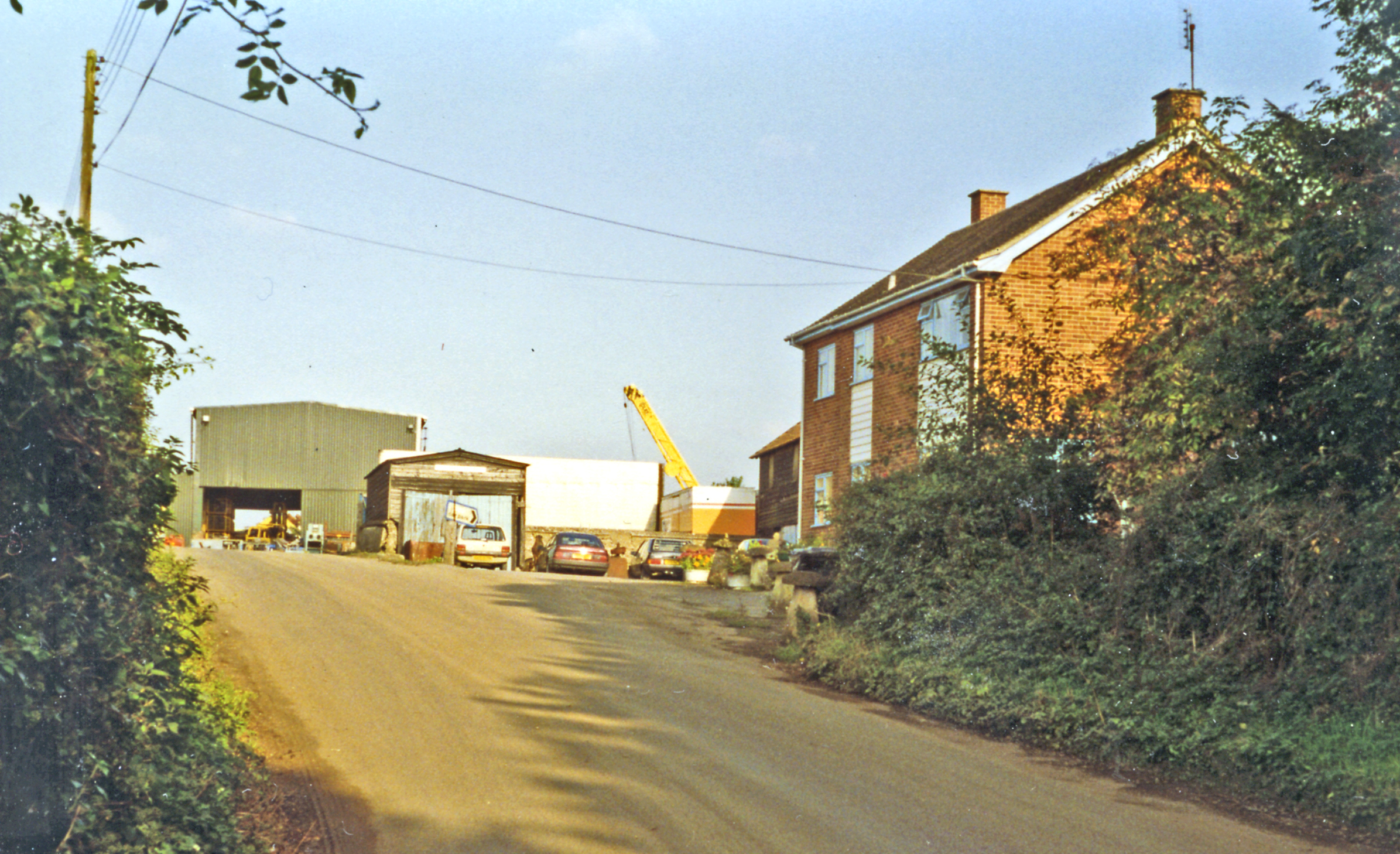
- Site of the station in 1993

General information
- Location: Hurstbourne Priors, Basingstoke and Deane, Hampshire; England
- Grid reference: SU4327449095
- Platforms: 2

Other information
- Status: Disused

History
- Opened: 1 December 1882
- Closed: 6 April 1964
- Pre-grouping: London and South Western Railway
- Post-grouping: Southern Railway; Southern Region of British Railways
Location

Hurstbourne railway station served the village of Hurstbourne Priors in Hampshire, England. It was on the London and South Western Railway's West of England Main Line and was also the junction for the Fullerton to Hurstbourne Line. Trains for the Fullerton line started and stopped at Whitchurch, the next station to the east on the main line.

== History ==
Passenger services were withdrawn on the Fullerton to Hurstbourne line in 1931, but Hurstbourne remained open for stopping services between Basingstoke and Andover until it closed in 1964. The site used to be occupied by a scrap metal dealer, but is now a new housing estate.

Preceding station	National Rail	Following station
Andover; Line and station open	West of England line London & South Western Railway	Whitchurch; Line and station open
	Disused railways	
Longparish; Line and station closed	Fullerton to Hurstbourne Line; London and South Western Railway	Terminus
