= Collingbourne railway station =

Former railway station in England

Coordinates: 51.28404°N 1.64980°W

Collingbourne
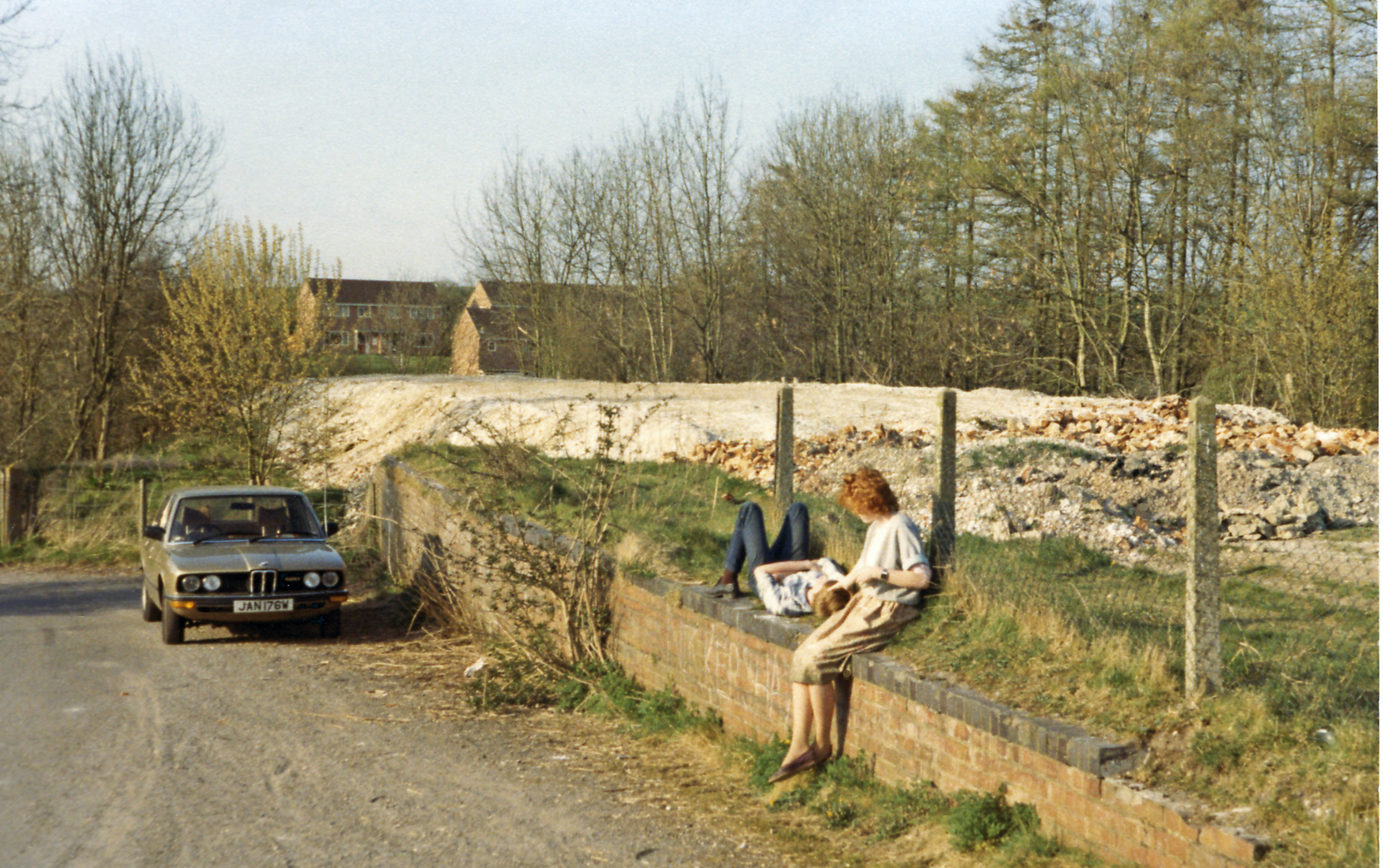
- Site of the station in 1984

General information
- Location: Collingbourne Ducis, Wiltshire; England
- Platforms: 2

Other information
- Status: Disused

History
- Original company: Swindon, Marlborough and Andover Railway
- Pre-grouping: Midland and South Western Junction Railway
- Post-grouping: Great Western Railway

Key dates
- 1 May 1882: Opened
- 11 Sep 1961: Closed
Location

Collingbourne railway station served the village of Collingbourne Ducis in Wiltshire, England. It was on the Midland and South Western Junction Railway (M&SWJR) and opened on 1 May 1882 on the southern section of the Swindon, Marlborough and Andover Railway (SM&AR) which at that stage terminated at the-then next station to the north, Grafton and Burbage. In 1883, the SM&AR gained running rights over the Great Western Railway branch from Savernake Low Level to Marlborough and through services started between Swindon Town and Andover Junction railway station, and on down the Sprat and Winkle Line to Southampton. The same year, the Swindon and Cheltenham Extension Railway (S&CER) opened north of Swindon as far as Cirencester and in 1884 the SM&AR and the S&CER merged to form the M&SWJR. The line was completed as a through-route from the Midlands to the south coast by the completion of the northern end of the route between Cirencester and Cheltenham in 1891.

Collingbourne was sited to the east of the village of Collingbourne Ducis and originally had a passing loop. The track was doubled through Collingbourne early in the 20th century.

Collingbourne station had a brick building on the up platform towards Swindon and a shelter on the down platform, which also housed a signalbox. The station master's house was behind the up platform. There was a small goods yard, but goods traffic was not high.

In 1932, a halt was opened at Collingbourne Kingston, about 1.5 miles north of Collingbourne station, in an effort by the GWR, which had taken over the M&SWJR on the Grouping in 1923, to generate traffic on a line threatened by increasing road use.

As a whole, traffic on the M&SWJR fell steeply after the Second World War and the line closed to passengers in 1961, with goods facilities withdrawn from this section of the line at the same time. Collingbourne station was demolished, though the station master's house remains.

== Routes ==
| Preceding station | Disused railways | Following station |
|---|---|---|
| Collingbourne Kingston Halt; Line and station closed | Midland and South Western Junction Railway; Swindon, Marlborough and Andover Railway | Ludgershall; Line and station closed |
