= Andover =

Andover may refer to:

== Places ==
=== Australia ===
- Andover, Tasmania

=== Canada ===
- Andover Parish, New Brunswick
- Perth-Andover, New Brunswick

=== United Kingdom ===
- Andover, Hampshire, England
  - RAF Andover, a former Royal Air Force station
  - Andover (constituency), a former constituency

=== United States ===
- Andover, Connecticut, a New England town
- Andover, Florida
- Andover, Illinois
- Andover, Iowa
- Andover, Kansas
- Andover, Maine, a New England town
- Andover, Massachusetts, a New England town
  - Andover (CDP), Massachusetts, the main village in the town
- Andover, Minnesota
- Andover, Missouri
- Andover, New Hampshire, a New England town
- Andover, New Jersey, a borough
- Andover Township, New Jersey
- Andover, Ohio
- Andover, South Dakota
- Andover, Vermont, a New England town
- Andover, Virginia

== Transportation ==
- Andover railway station (England), in Andover, Hampshire, England
- Andover Town railway station, a former station in Andover, Hampshire, England
- Andover Road station in Micheldever, Hampshire, 15 km from Andover
- Andover station (Delaware, Lackawanna and Western Railroad), a former station in Andover, New Jersey, US
- Andover station (MBTA), in Andover, Massachusetts, US
- Andover station (NJ Transit), in Andover, New Jersey, US

== Other ==
- Phillips Academy Andover, a Massachusetts boarding school
- Andover Theological Seminary, now part of Andover Newton Theological School, Massachusetts
- Avro Andover, a British military transport aircraft of the 1920s
- Hawker Siddeley Andover, a British military transport aircraft
- Andover, Kansas Tornado Outbreak, a tornado in Kansas
- Duke of Andover, fictional character in The Black Moth, 1921 novel by Georgette Heyer
- Andover (film), a 2017 science fiction romantic comedy film
- Andover (horse)
