= Fullerton, Hampshire =

Village in Hampshire, England

Coordinates: 51.152922°N 1.460288°W

Fullerton
- Location within Hampshire
- OS grid reference: SU3784439434
- Civil parish: Wherwell
- District: Test Valley
- Shire county: Hampshire
- Region: South East
- Country: England
- Sovereign state: United Kingdom
- Post town: ANDOVER
- Postcode district: SP11
- Dialling code: 01264
- Police: Hampshire and Isle of Wight
- Fire: Hampshire and Isle of Wight
- Ambulance: South Central
- UK Parliament: North West Hampshire

Fullerton is a small village in Wherwell civil parish in the Test Valley district of Hampshire, England. At the 2011 Census the Post Office say the population was included in the civil parish of Wherwell. The village lies west of the River Test, alongside the River Anton which joins the Test, and just off the A3057 road. Its nearest town is Andover, which lies approximately 4.1 miles (6.7 km) north from the village although it lies closer to Stockbridge. Cottonworth is close by, on the opposite side of the River Anton.

Fullerton Junction railway station was located here until its closure in October 1964.

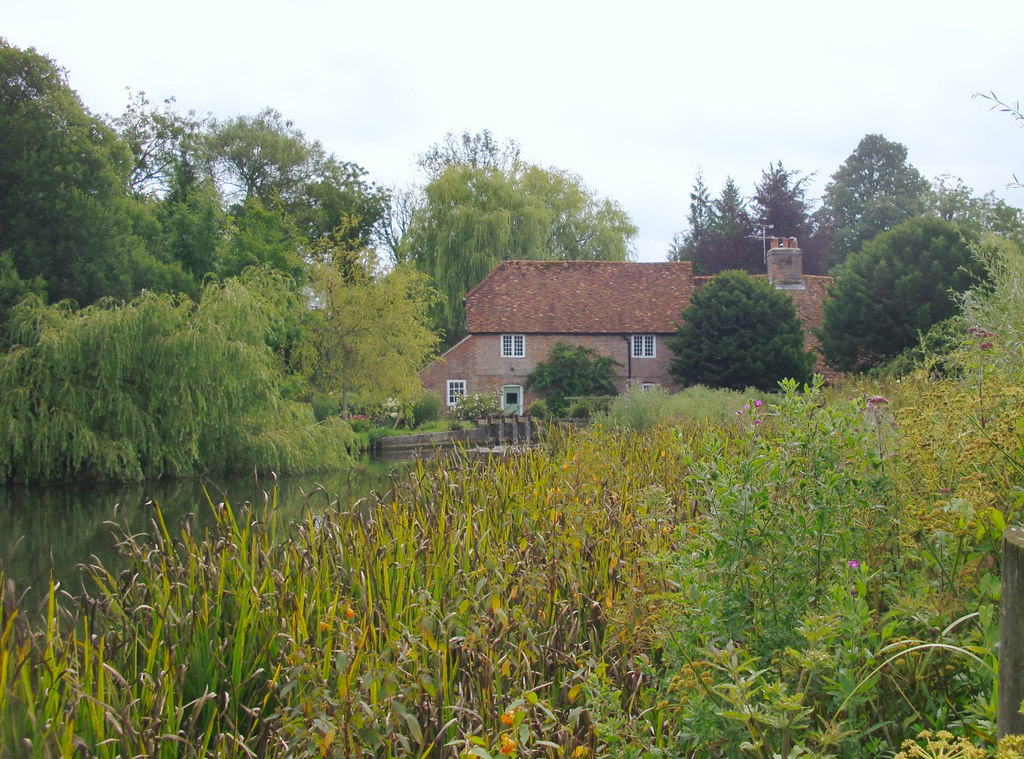
Fullerton Mill, on the River Anton
