= Horsebridge =

Village in Hampshire, England

Coordinates: 51.066700°N 1.5°W

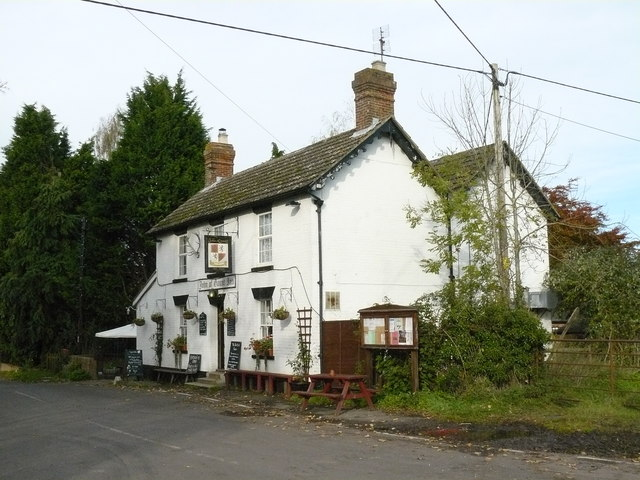

- Location within Hampshire
- OS grid reference: SU3513229826
- Civil parish: Kings Somborne
- District: Test Valley
- Shire county: Hampshire
- Region: South East
- Country: England
- Sovereign state: United Kingdom
- Post town: Stockbridge
- Postcode district: SO20
- Dialling code: 01794
- Police: Hampshire and Isle of Wight
- Fire: Hampshire and Isle of Wight
- Ambulance: South Central
- UK Parliament: North West Hampshire

Horsebridge is a small village in the civil parish of Kings Somborne in the Test Valley district of Hampshire, England. Its nearest town is Stockbridge, which lies approximately 3.6 miles (5.2 km) north-east from the village. The village has one pub, named the John O'Gaunt Inn.

The village formerly had its own railway station, which ran between Romsey and Andover on the Sprat and Winkle Line, but this was closed down in 1962.
