= Clatford railway station =

Disused railway station in Hampshire, England

Clatford
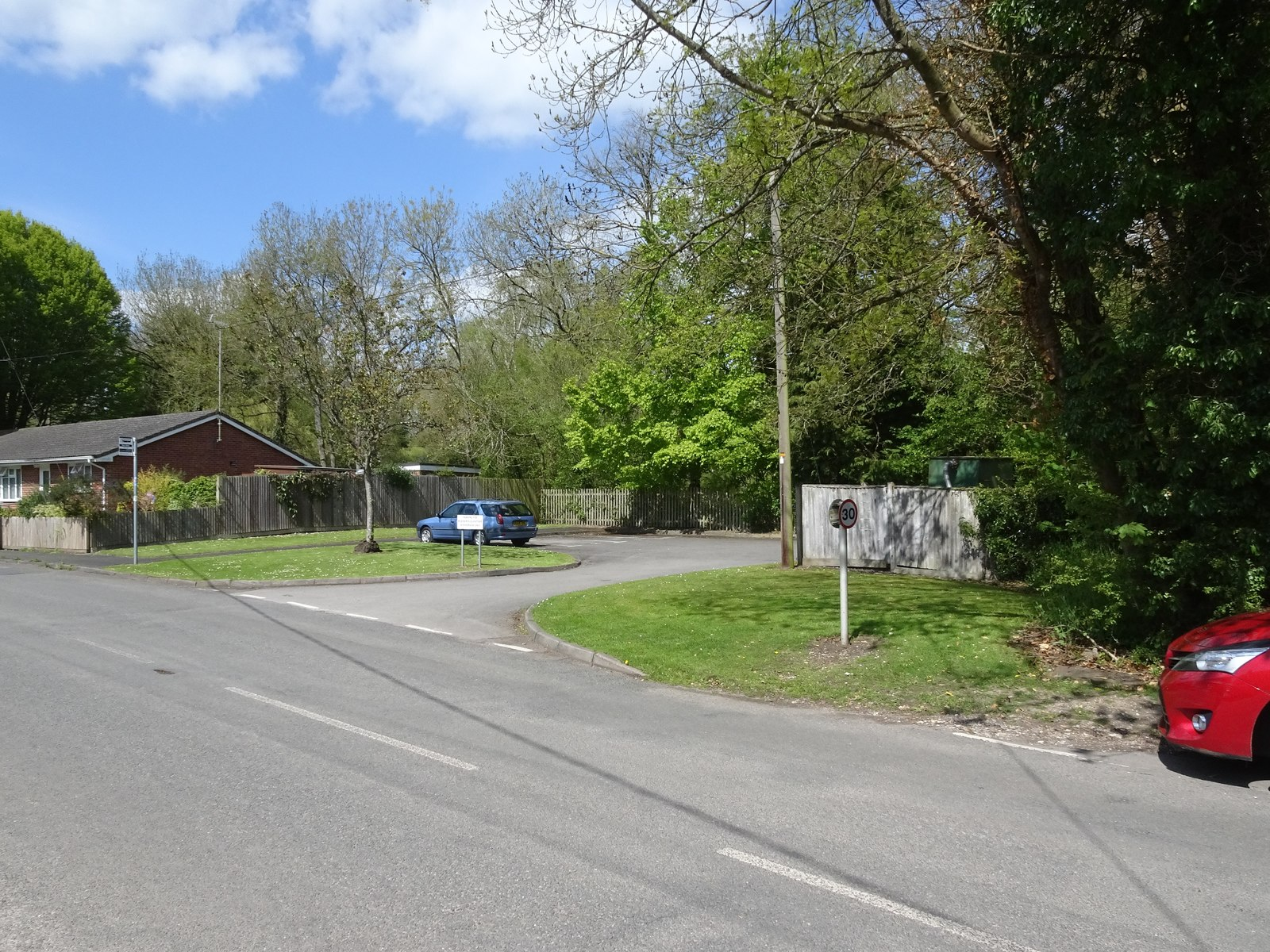
- The site of the station in 2018

General information
- Location: Goodworth Clatford, Hampshire; England
- Coordinates: 51.1814°N 1.4851°W
- Grid reference: SU360425
- Platforms: 2

Other information
- Status: Disused

History
- Original company: London and South Western Railway
- Pre-grouping: London and South Western Railway
- Post-grouping: Southern Railway; British Railways (Southern Region)

Key dates
- 6 March 1865: Opened
- 7 September 1964: Closed
Location

Clatford railway station served the village of Goodworth Clatford, Hampshire, England, from 1865 to 1964 on the Sprat and Winkle Line.

== History ==
The station opened on 6 March 1865 by the London and South Western Railway. It closed on 7 September 1964. The edge of one of the platforms is the only thing that remains.

Preceding station	Disused railways	Following station
Andover Town; Line and station closed	London and South Western Railway; Sprat and Winkle Line	Fullerton Junction; Line and station closed
