= Fullerton Junction railway station =

Disused railway station in Fullerton, Hampshire

Fullerton Junction
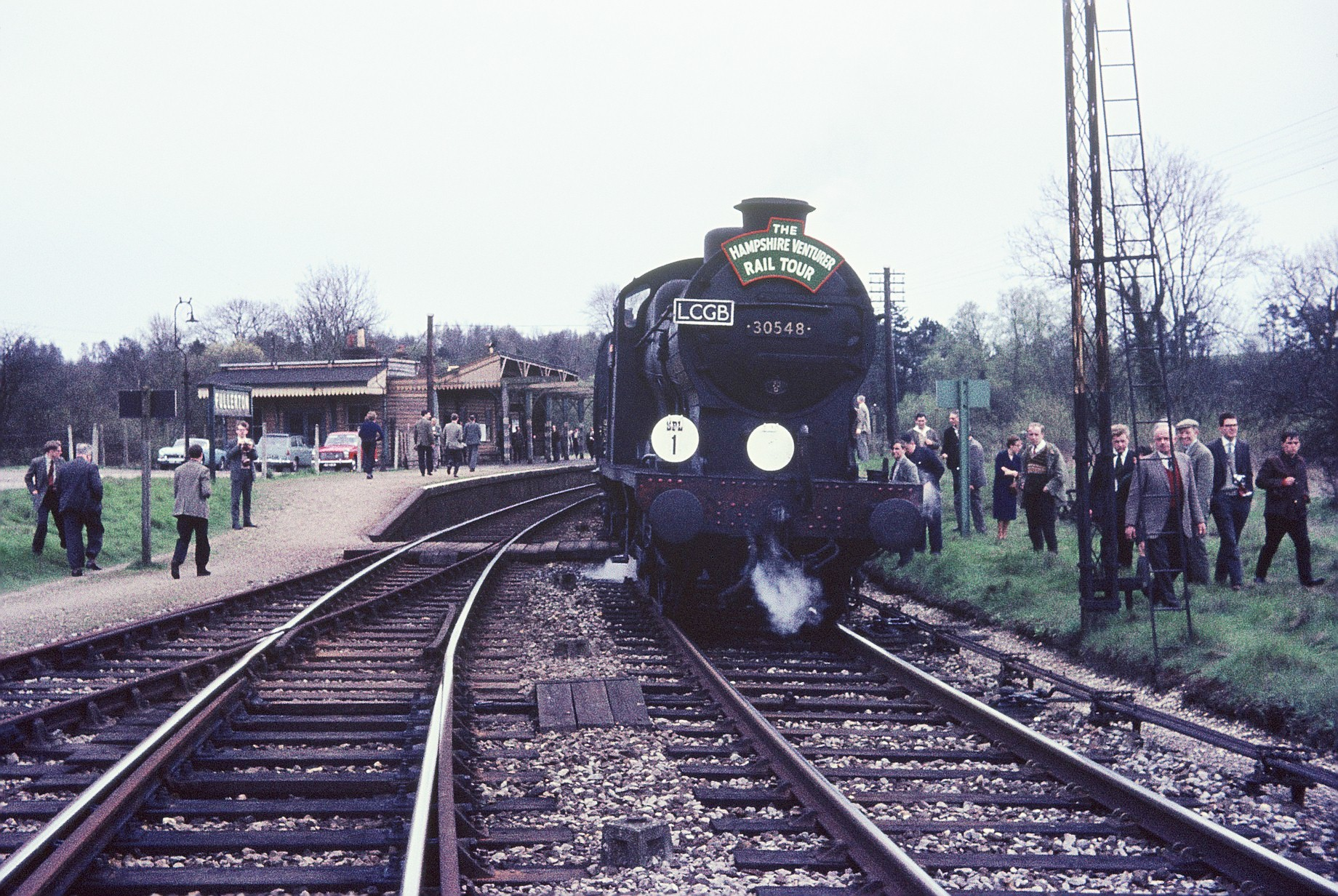
- Railway Enthusiasts railtour on 18 April 1964

General information
- Location: Fullerton, Hampshire; England
- Coordinates: 51.1523°N 1.4571°W
- Grid reference: SU380393
- Platforms: 4

Other information
- Status: Disused

History
- Original company: London and South Western Railway
- Post-grouping: Southern Railway

Key dates
- 6 March 1865: First station opened as Fullerton Bridge
- 1871: Renamed Fullerton
- 2 February 1885: First station closed and second station opened as Fullerton
- 1889: Name changed to Fullerton Junction
- 7 July 1929: Name reverted to Fullerton
- 7 September 1964: Closed
Location

Fullerton Junction railway station served the village of Fullerton, Hampshire, England. It was on the Sprat and Winkle Line and the Fullerton to Hurstbourne Line.

== History ==
Fullerton Bridge station, on the Sprat and Winkle line, opened on 6 March 1865. It was renamed Fullerton in 1871. On 2 February 1885 the platforms were moved slightly to the south in preparation for the opening of the line to Hurstbourne. The station was re-named Fullerton Junction in 1889 but it was changed back on 7 July 1929. The station master's house remained at the original site. The branch to Hurstbourne closed for passengers in 1931 and totally in 1956. The station closed along with the Kimbridge Junction to Andover Junction section of the Sprat and Winkle on 7 September 1964. The track was lifted and the buildings at the Junction station were demolished, although the platforms survive, covered in trees. The buildings at the original station are now private houses.

| Preceding station | Disused railways | Following station |
|---|---|---|
| Clatford; Line and station closed | Andover and Redbridge railway London & South Western Railway | Stockbridge; Line and station closed |
| Wherwell; Line and station closed | Fullerton to Hurstbourne Line; London and South Western Railway | Terminus |
