= Ludgershall railway station, Wiltshire =

Former railway station in England

Coordinates: 51.2548°N 1.6215°W

Ludgershall
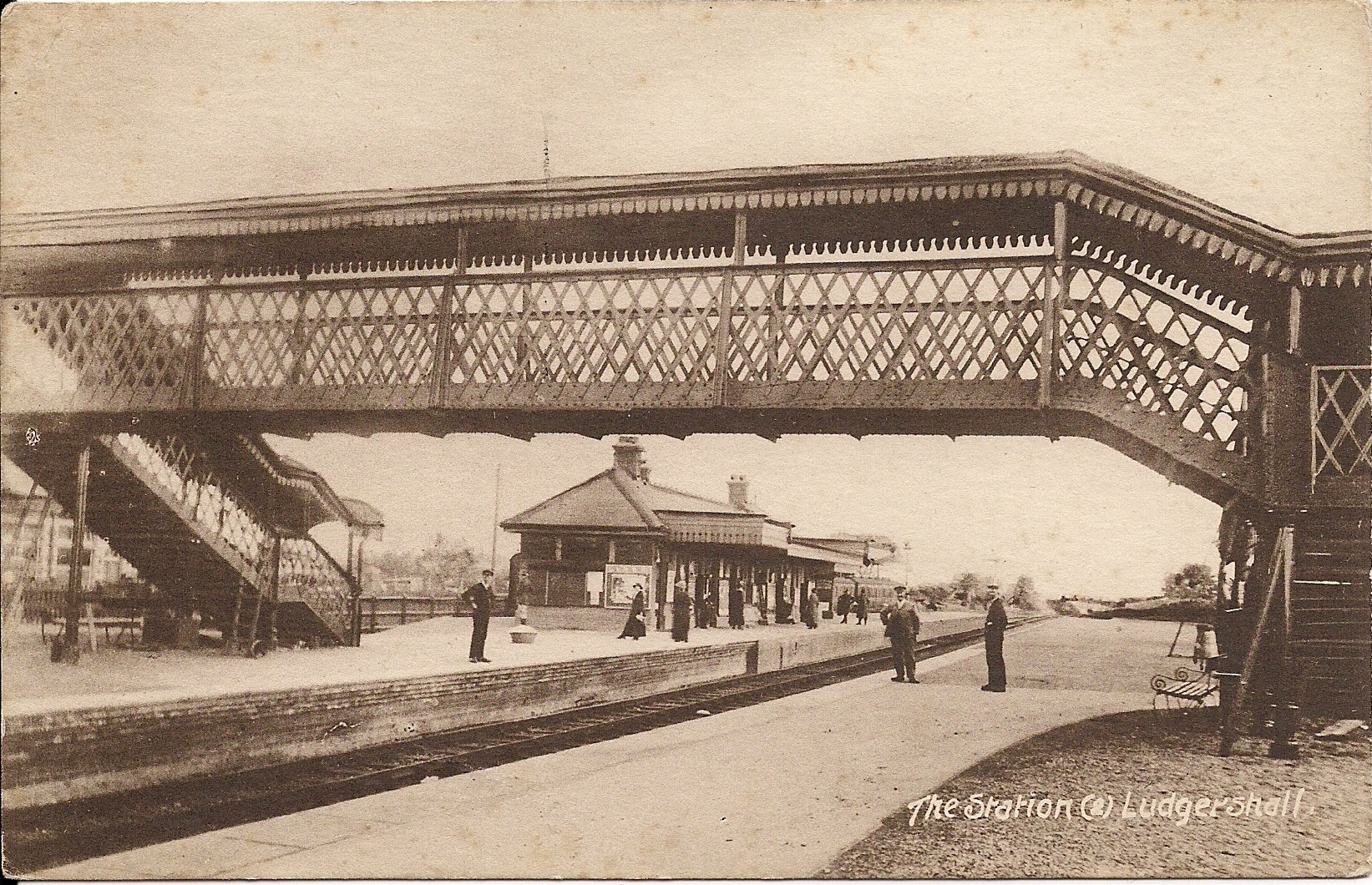
- The station in the 1900s

General information
- Location: Ludgershall, Wiltshire; England
- Platforms: 2

Other information
- Status: Disused

History
- Original company: Swindon, Marlborough and Andover Railway
- Pre-grouping: Midland and South Western Junction Railway
- Post-grouping: Great Western Railway

Key dates
- 1 May 1882: Opened
- 11 Sep 1961: Closed
Location

Ludgershall railway station served the town of Ludgershall in Wiltshire, England from 1882 to 1961.

== History ==
The station was opened on 1 May 1882, on the Swindon, Marlborough and Andover Railway. By 1894, the operator was the Midland and South Western Junction Railway, running services between Cheltenham and Southampton. In 1901, a branch from Ludgershall was built to serve Tidworth Camp, carrying military personnel, and was opened to the public in 1902. In 1943 a short spur was added to serve the military depot at Ludgershall, to the south of the main road.

As a whole, traffic on the M&SWJR fell steeply after the Second World War. The station closed to passengers in 1961, along with the northern section of the line up to Swindon, while the branch to Tidworth closed to passengers in 1955, and fully closed in 1963. The spur at Ludgershall and line south to Andover remain open, to allow the Army to transport tanks and other equipment to and from the depot and onwards to the Salisbury Plain Training Area. There is a level crossing on Tidworth Road.

== Possible reopening ==
Ludgershall Town Council and the pressure group Railfuture have been campaigning for the line between Ludgershall and Andover to be reopened for passenger services, due to the growth in population in Tidworth.

== Routes ==
Preceding station	Disused railways	Following station
Collingbourne; Line and station closed	Midland and South Western Junction Railway; Swindon, Marlborough and Andover Railway	Weyhill; Line and station closed
