= Listed buildings in Collingbourne Kingston =

Buildings in Collingbourne Kingston, Wiltshire, England

Collingbourne Kingston is a village and civil parish in Wiltshire, England. It contains 32 listed buildings that are recorded in the National Heritage List for England. Of these two are grade II* and 30 are grade II.

This list is based on the information retrieved online from Historic England.

== Key ==
Grade	Criteria
I	Buildings that are of exceptional interest
II*	Particularly important buildings of more than special interest
II	Buildings that are of special interest

== Listing ==
Name	Grade	Location	Type	Completed (Note: The date given is the date used by Historic England as significant for the initial building or that of an important part in the structure's description.)	Date designated	Grid ref. (Note: The grid reference is based on the British national grid reference system, sometimes known as OSGB36, used by the Ordnance Survey.) Geo-coordinates	Notes	Entry number (Note: The "List Entry Number" is a unique number assigned to each listed building and scheduled monument by Historic England.)	Image	Wikidata
54 and 55, A338	II	54 and 55, A338			13 June 1988	SU2387655811; 51°18′03″N 1°39′32″W		1035972	Upload Photo	Q26287572
General Stores	II	61, A338			13 June 1988	SU2385155703; 51°18′00″N 1°39′33″W		1285291	Upload Photo	Q26573997
Crowdown Milestone at NGR SU 2165 5739	II				20 August 1998	SU2165457396; 51°18′55″N 1°41′26″W		1376142	Upload Photo	Q26656793
Barns at Manor Farm	II	A338			13 June 1988	SU2380555882; 51°18′06″N 1°39′36″W		1285318	Upload Photo	Q26574022
Carthouse at Manor Farm	II	A338			13 June 1988	SU2386355836; 51°18′04″N 1°39′33″W		1364548	Carthouse at Manor Farm More images	Q26646311
Church Cottage	II	A338			13 June 1988	SU2390355812; 51°18′03″N 1°39′31″W		1364546	Upload Photo	Q26646309
Church of St Mary	II*	A338	church building		27 May 1964	SU2391355840; 51°18′04″N 1°39′30″W		1285324	Church of St Mary More images	Q17546127
Collingbourne Kingston War Memorial	II	SN8 3SD			22 September 2015	SU2391655799; 51°18′03″N 1°39′30″W		1429092	Upload Photo	Q26677494
Longacre	II	A338			13 June 1988	SU2365856637; 51°18′30″N 1°39′43″W		1035970	Upload Photo	Q26287569
Manor Farmhouse	II	A338			13 June 1988	SU2385655886; 51°18′06″N 1°39′33″W		1035971	Manor Farmhouse More images	Q26287571
Mayzells Norrie Cottage	II	A338			13 June 1988	SU2387255654; 51°17′58″N 1°39′32″W		1364547	Upload Photo	Q26646310
Milestone Opposite Aughton Farm	II	A338			13 June 1988	SU2361956763; 51°18′34″N 1°39′45″W		1180778	Upload Photo	Q26476094
Outbuilding to Church Cottage	II	A338			13 June 1988	SU2389655813; 51°18′03″N 1°39′31″W		1180735	Upload Photo	Q26476046
The Cleaver Inn	II	A338	inn		27 May 1964	SU2385155762; 51°18′02″N 1°39′33″W		1364549	The Cleaver Inn More images	Q26646312
The Old House	II	A338			27 May 1964	SU2389755782; 51°18′02″N 1°39′31″W		1035969	Upload Photo	Q26287568
Wall Bounding North Side of Manor Farm Garden	II	A338			13 June 1988	SU2386655929; 51°18′07″N 1°39′33″W		1180804	Upload Photo	Q26476123
Milestone in Front of Milend, at South End of Village	II	At South End Of Village, A338			13 June 1988	SU2397955241; 51°17′45″N 1°39′27″W		1180832	Upload Photo	Q26476150
Little Hawkesgrove	II	21, Aughton			13 June 1988	SU2398856427; 51°18′23″N 1°39′26″W		1035974	Upload Photo	Q26287574
Aughton Farmhouse	II	A338, Aughton			13 June 1988	SU2371256687; 51°18′32″N 1°39′40″W		1364545	Upload Photo	Q26646308
Aughton House	II	Aughton			27 May 1964	SU2396356448; 51°18′24″N 1°39′27″W		1035973	Upload Photo	Q26287573
October Cottage	II	Aughton			13 June 1988	SU2391856398; 51°18′22″N 1°39′30″W		1180843	Upload Photo	Q26476165
September Cottage	II	Aughton			13 June 1988	SU2393256484; 51°18′25″N 1°39′29″W		1364550	Upload Photo	Q26646313
Yew Tree Cottage	II	Aughton			13 June 1988	SU2393156372; 51°18′21″N 1°39′29″W		1180835	Upload Photo	Q26476154
Mays Cottages	II	1 and 2, Brunton			13 June 1988	SU2446356415; 51°18′23″N 1°39′02″W		1285271	Upload Photo	Q26573978
Brunton Farmhouse	II	Brunton			13 June 1988	SU2424656181; 51°18′15″N 1°39′13″W		1180850	Upload Photo	Q26476173
Brunton House	II*	Brunton	house		4 June 1952	SU2426456118; 51°18′13″N 1°39′12″W		1364551	Brunton House More images	Q17546664
Downside	II	Brunton			13 June 1988	SU2443056387; 51°18′22″N 1°39′03″W		1035976	Upload Photo	Q26287576
Slough Cottage	II	Brunton			13 June 1988	SU2458256655; 51°18′31″N 1°38′55″W		1285269	Upload Photo	Q26573976
Yew Tree Cottage	II	Brunton			13 June 1988	SU2452756459; 51°18′24″N 1°38′58″W		1035975	Upload Photo	Q26287575
Gilbert Monument in Churchyard, Approximately 3 Metres South of Chancel, Church of St Mary	II	Approximately 3 Metres South Of Chancel, Church Of St Mary, A338			13 June 1988	SU2393055835; 51°18′04″N 1°39′29″W		1035968	Upload Photo	Q26287567
Barnes Monument in Churchyard, Approximately 4 Metres South of Chancel, Church of St Mary	II	Approximately 4 Metres South Of Chancel, Church Of St Mary, A338			13 June 1988	SU2392655833; 51°18′04″N 1°39′29″W		1180734	Upload Photo	Q26476045
Wall Enclosing East Garden to Parsonage Farm, with Gazebo	II	With Gazebo, A338			13 June 1988	SU2398955759; 51°18′02″N 1°39′26″W		1180741	Upload Photo	Q26476052

== See also ==
- Grade I listed buildings in Wiltshire
- Grade II* listed buildings in Wiltshire

== Sources ==
- Orbach, Julian; Pevsner, Nikolaus; Cherry, Bridget (2021), Wiltshire, The Buildings of England, New Haven and London: Yale University Press, ISBN 978-0-300-25120-3
