= Stockbridge railway station =

Disused railway station in Hampshire, England

Stockbridge
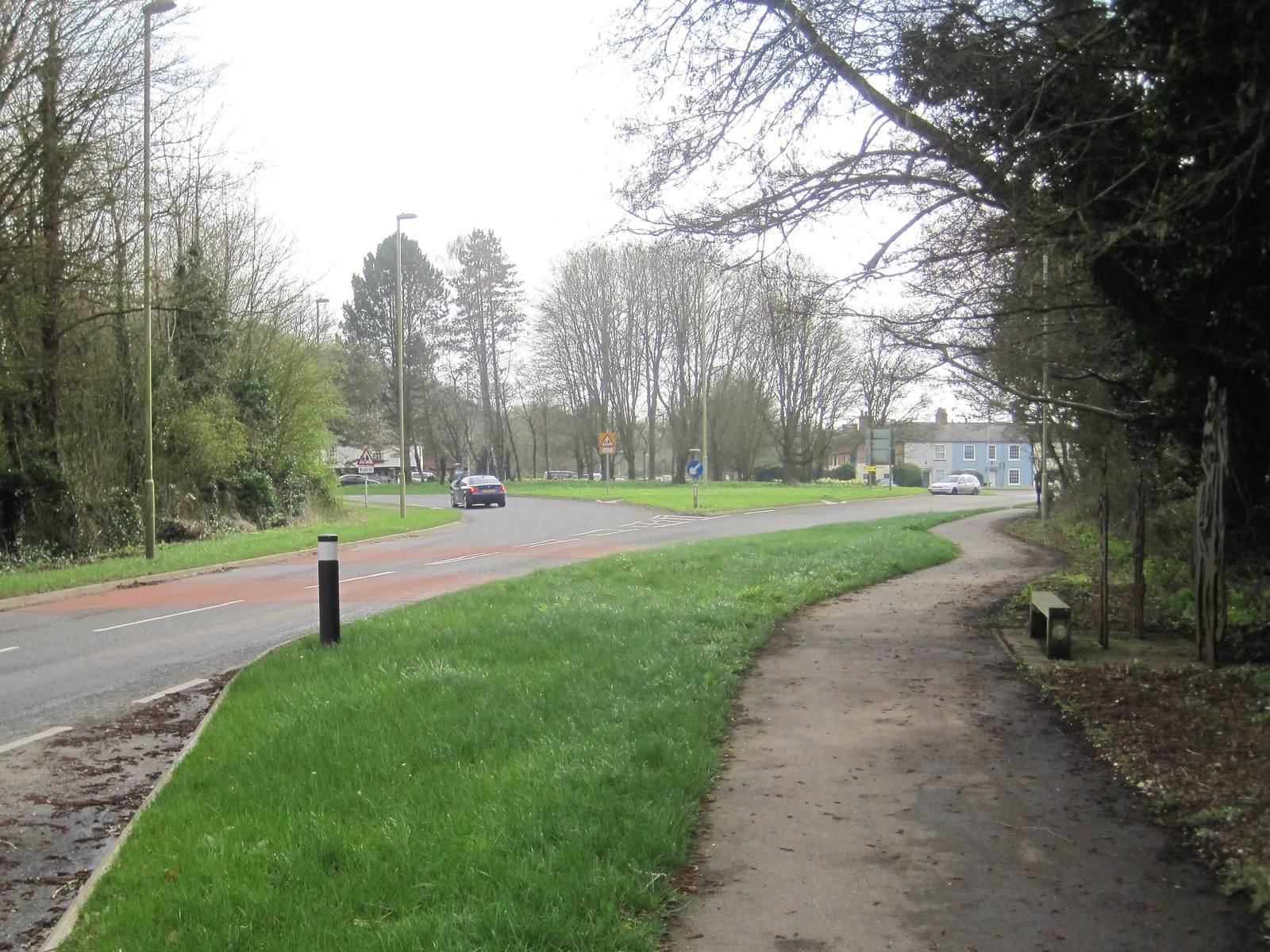
- The site of the station in 2017

General information
- Location: Stockbridge, Hampshire; England
- Coordinates: 51.1137°N 1.4883°W
- Grid reference: SU359350
- Platforms: 2

Other information
- Status: Disused

History
- Original company: London and South Western Railway
- Pre-grouping: London and South Western Railway
- Post-grouping: Southern Railway; British Railways (Southern Region)

Key dates
- 6 March 1865: Opened
- 7 September 1964: Closed
Location

Stockbridge railway station served the town of Stockbridge, Hampshire, England, from 1865 to 1964 on the Sprat and Winkle Line.

== History ==
The station was opened on 6 March 1865 by the London and South Western Railway. It closed on 7 September 1964 and was demolished on 1971. No trace remains.

Preceding station	Disused railways	Following station
Fullerton Junction; Line and station closed	London and South Western Railway; Sprat and Winkle Line	Horsebridge; Line and station closed
