= Wherwell railway station =

Disused railway station in Wherwell, Hampshire

Coordinates: 51.1655°N 1.4467°W

Wherwell
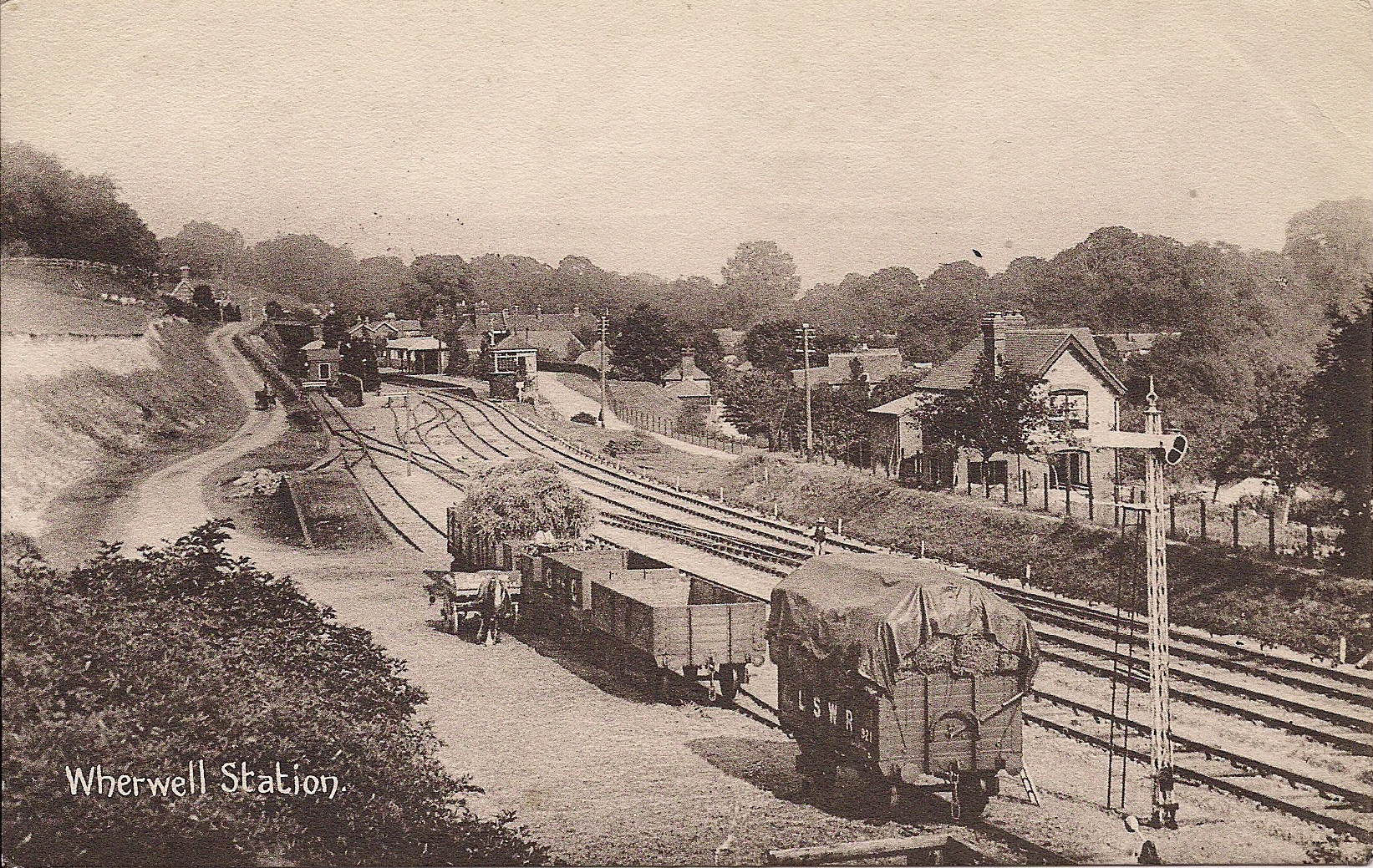
- A postal card of the station

General information
- Location: Wherwell, Hampshire; England
- Platforms: 2

Other information
- Status: Disused

History
- Original company: London and South Western Railway
- Post-grouping: Southern Railway

Key dates
- 1 June 1885: Opened
- 6 July 1931: Closed to passengers
- 1956: Closed completely
Location

Wherwell railway station served the village of Wherwell, Hampshire, England, from 1885 to 1956 on the Fullerton to Hurstbourne Line.

== History ==
The station opened on 1 June 1885 by the London and South Western Railway. It was situated north of Fullerton Junction and south of Longparish station. The station closed to passengers on 6 July 1931 and to goods traffic in 1956.

Preceding station	Disused railways	Following station
Longparish; Line and station closed	Fullerton to Hurstbourne Line; London and South Western Railway	Fullerton Junction; Line and station closed
