= Mottisfont railway station =

Disused railway station in Mottisfont, Hampshire

Mottisfont

General information
- Location: Mottisfont, Hampshire; England
- Coordinates: 51.036596°N 1.5265°W
- Grid reference: SU333264
- Platforms: 2

Other information
- Status: Disused

History
- Original company: London and South Western Railway
- Pre-grouping: London and South Western Railway
- Post-grouping: Southern Railway; British Railways (Southern Region)

Key dates
- 6 March 1865: Opened
- 7 September 1964: Closed
Location

Mottisfont railway station served the village of Mottisfont, Hampshire, England, from 1865 to 1964 on the Sprat and Winkle Line.

The nearby Dunbridge station on the Wessex Main Line has been renamed as Mottisfont and Dunbridge. The Test Way and Monarch's Way long-distance footpaths pass through the village.

== History ==
The station was opened on 6 March 1865 on the London and South Western Railway. It closed on 7 September 1964.

== Today ==
The station today has now been converted into a home. There is still evidence of the crossing posts, and the station platforms have been preserved.

Preceding station	Disused railways	Following station
Horsebridge; Line and station closed	London and South Western Railway; Sprat and Winkle Line	Romsey; Line closed, station open
