= Brunton, Wiltshire =

Hamlet in Wiltshire, England

Coordinates: 51.305°N 1.653°W

Brunton
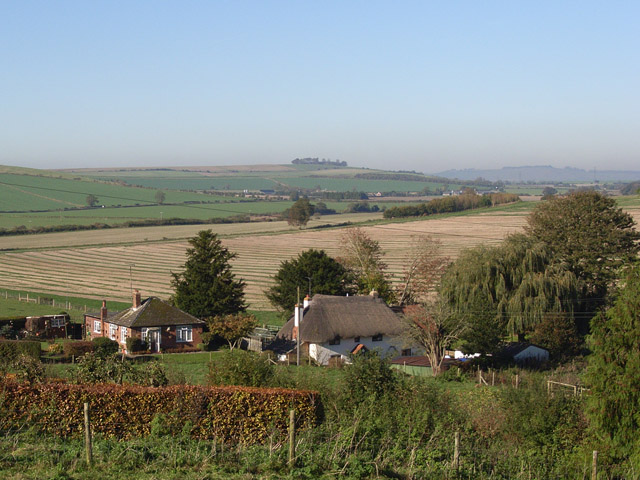

- Location within Wiltshire
- OS grid reference: SU243563
- Civil parish: Collingbourne Kingston
- Unitary authority: Wiltshire
- Ceremonial county: Wiltshire
- Region: South West
- Country: England
- Sovereign state: United Kingdom
- Post town: Marlborough
- Postcode district: SN8
- Dialling code: 01264
- Police: Wiltshire
- Fire: Dorset and Wiltshire
- Ambulance: South Western
- UK Parliament: East Wiltshire

Brunton is a hamlet adjacent to the village of Collingbourne Kingston in Wiltshire, England. Records of Brunton's existence date back to the 10th century, under Saxon ownership, and it is near the sites of several barrows.

The manor was previously known as "Collingbourne Valence", in reference to the noble family which owned it and neighbouring settlements in the 13th and 14th centuries. Brunton was not given to Hyde Abbey at the time that Collingbourne Kingston and Aughton were.

Brunton House is a seven-bay house from the late 17th or early 18th centuries, in brick with flint panels. It is a Grade II* listed building.
