= Collingbourne Kingston Halt railway station =

Former railway station in England

Coordinates: 51.30161°N 1.65656°W

Collingbourne Kingston Halt
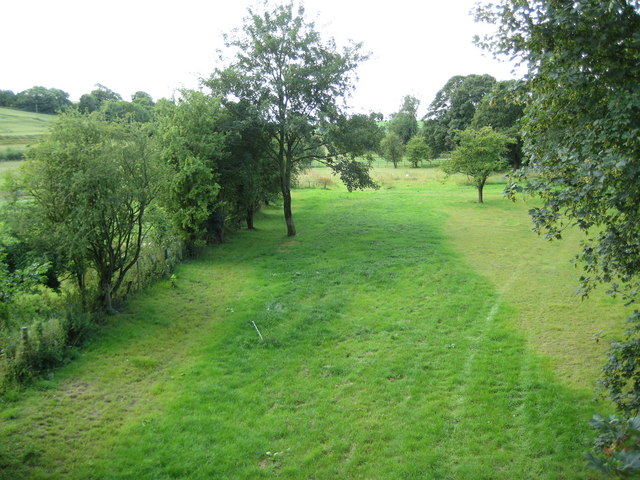
- Station site in 2009

General information
- Location: Collingbourne Kingston, Wiltshire; England
- Platforms: 2

Other information
- Status: Disused

History
- Original company: Great Western Railway
- Post-grouping: Great Western Railway

Key dates
- 1 April 1932: Opened
- 11 Sep 1961: Closed
Location

Collingbourne Kingston Halt was a small railway station that served the village of Collingbourne Kingston in Wiltshire, England for less than 30 years. The station was on the former Midland and South Western Junction Railway, which was a north–south through-route between the Midlands and the south coast ports and which had been built through Collingbourne Kingston in 1882.

The M&SWJR did not provide a station at Collingbourne Kingston, which was served by Collingbourne railway station at Collingbourne Ducis, 1.5 miles away. But in 1932, after the M&SWJR had been taken over by the Great Western Railway in the 1923 Grouping, a halt was built for the village in an effort to generate traffic in the face of competition from road transport. The construction of the station was fairly rudimentary: railway sleeper platforms with corrugated iron shelters. No staff were ever provided and tickets were sold at No 54 High Street.

Traffic on the M&SWJR line declined heavily after the war and the line closed to passenger and goods traffic in 1961. There are no traces of Collingbourne Kingston Halt today, apart from a road bridge over the former line.

== Routes ==
| Preceding station | Disused railways | Following station |
|---|---|---|
| Grafton and Burbage; Line and station closed | Midland and South Western Junction Railway; Swindon, Marlborough and Andover Railway | Collingbourne; Line and station closed |
