= Brunton House =

House in Brunton, Wiltshire, England

Coordinates: 51°18′13″N 1°39′12″W

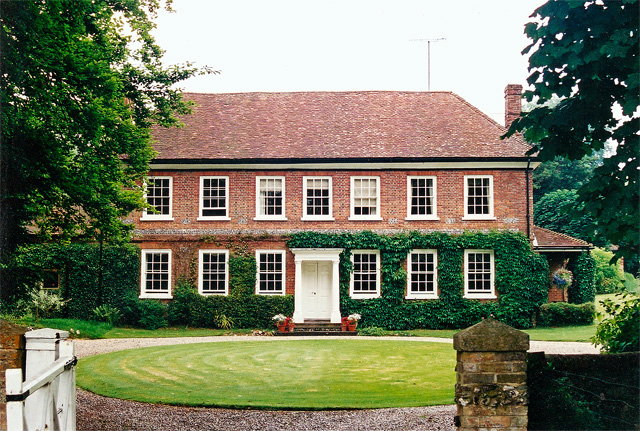
Brunton House

Brunton House is a Grade II* listed house in Brunton, Wiltshire, England. It dates from the late seventeenth or early eighteenth centuries and is of brick with flint panels and a tiled roof.
