= Longparish railway station =

Disused railway station in Longparish, Hampshire

Longparish
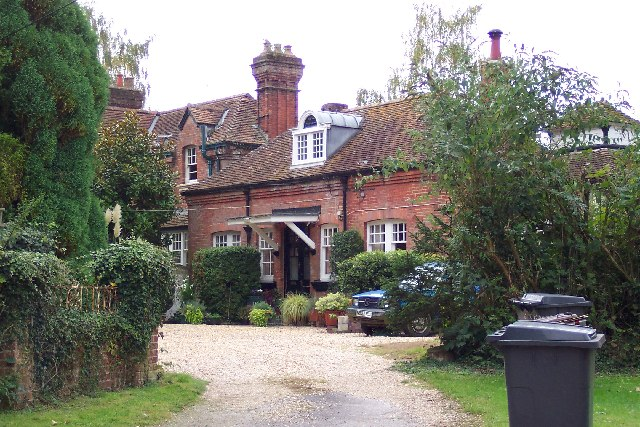
- Longparish railway station is now a private residence c.2005

General information
- Location: Longparish, Hampshire; England
- Coordinates: 51.1856°N 1.4105°W
- Grid reference: SU413431
- Platforms: 2

Other information
- Status: Disused

History
- Original company: London and South Western Railway
- Post-grouping: Southern Railway

Key dates
- 1 June 1885: Opened
- 1 July 1931: Closed to passengers
- 6 July 1956: Closed completely
Location

Longparish railway station served the village of Longparish, Hampshire, England from 1885 to 1956 on the Fullerton to Hurstbourne Line.

== History ==
The station opened on 1 June 1885 by the London and South Western Railway. The station closed to passengers on 1 July 1931 and to goods traffic on 6 July 1956. The site is now a private house.

Preceding station	Disused railways	Following station
Hurstbourne; Line and station closed	Fullerton to Hurstbourne Line; London and South Western Railway	Wherwell; Line and station closed
