= Andover Town railway station =

Disused railway station in Andover, Hampshire

Coordinates: 51.20494°N 1.48253°W

Andover Town
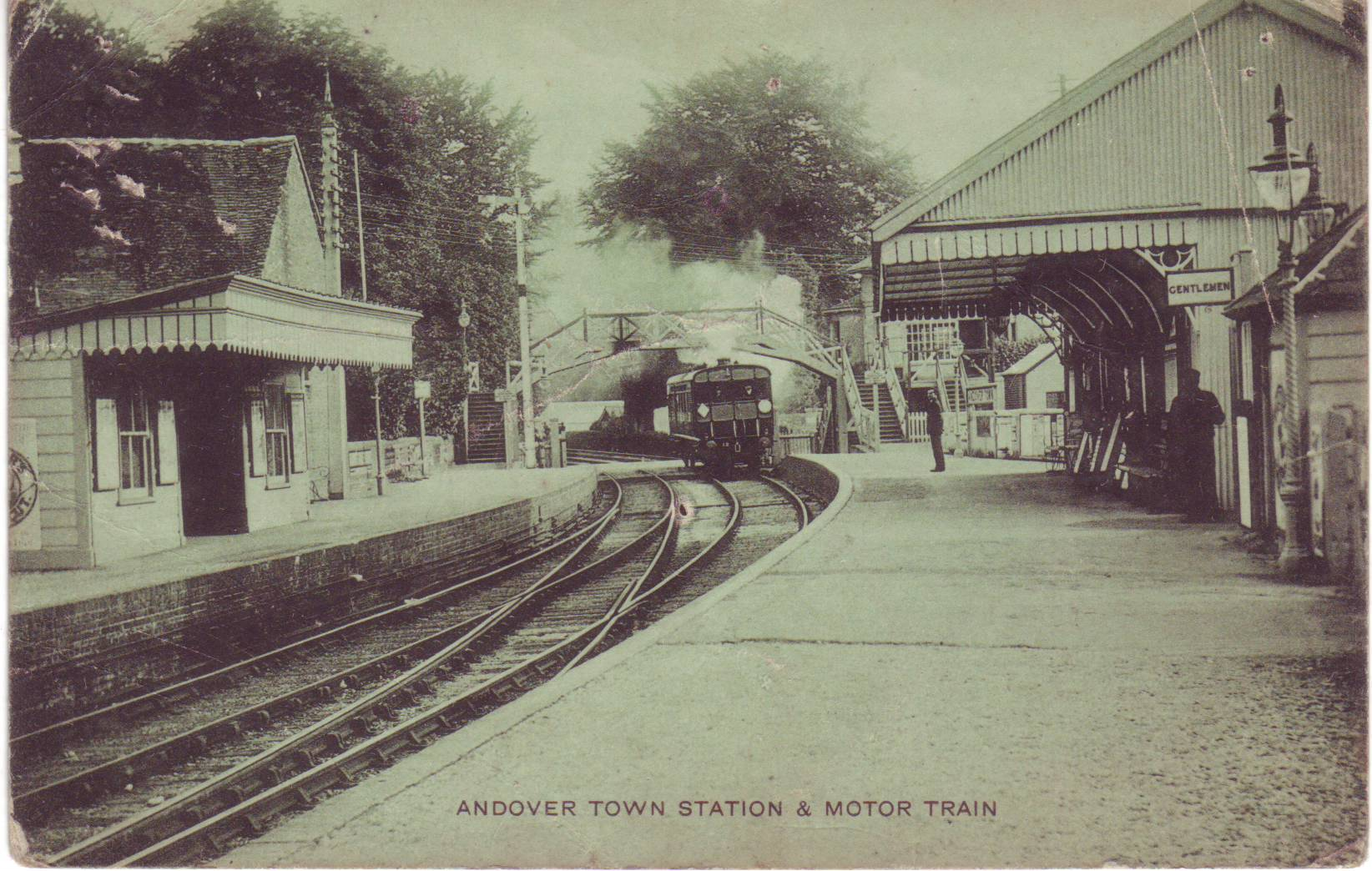

General information
- Location: Andover, Test Valley; England
- Grid reference: SU362452
- Platforms: 2

Other information
- Status: Disused

History
- Original company: Andover and Redbridge Railway
- Pre-grouping: London and South Western Railway
- Post-grouping: Southern Railway

Key dates
- 6 March 1865: Station opens
- 7 September 1964: Station closed for passengers
- 18 September 1967: Station closed for freight
Location

Andover Town railway station was a former railway station that served the town of Andover in the English county of Hampshire. Located on the Andover to Redbridge Line over which the Midland and South Western Junction Railway had running powers, its closure left services to the town to the Andover station, which was formerly known as Andover Junction station.

== History ==
Originally built by the Andover and Redbridge Railway, the station joined the London and South Western Railway and so was absorbed by the Southern Railway during the Grouping of 1923, although The M&SWJR was allocated to the Great Western Railway. The station then passed on to the Southern Region of British Railways on nationalisation in 1948.

This route fell victim to the Beeching Axe in September 1964, three years after passenger trains had been withdrawn from the M&SWJR line.

== The site today ==
The former site is now occupied by the A3057 dual carriageway.

Preceding station	Disused railways	Following station
Andover Junction; Line closed, station open	Southern Railway; Sprat and Winkle Line	Clatford; Line and station closed
