= Weyhill railway station =

Former railway station in England

Weyhill

General information
- Location: Weyhill, Test Valley; England
- Coordinates: 51.2153°N 1.5643°W
- Platforms: 2

Other information
- Status: Disused

History
- Original company: Swindon, Marlborough and Andover Railway
- Pre-grouping: Midland and South Western Junction Railway
- Post-grouping: Great Western Railway

Key dates
- 1 May 1882: Opened
- 11 Sep 1961: Closed
Location

Weyhill railway station was a railway station opened by the Midland and South Western Junction Railway in what is now the western suburbs of Andover, Hampshire, England.

== History ==
As of 2009, the station was the site of a distribution company.

== Routes ==
Preceding station	Disused railways	Following station
Ludgershall; Line and station closed	Midland and South Western Junction Railway; Swindon, Marlborough and Andover Railway	Andover; Line closed, station open
