= Cottonworth =

Hamlet in Hampshire, England

Coordinates: 51.155410°N 1.459395°W

- Location within Hampshire
- OS grid reference: SU3790539712
- Civil parish: Wherwell
- District: Test Valley
- Shire county: Hampshire
- Region: South East
- Country: England
- Sovereign state: United Kingdom
- Post town: ANDOVER
- Postcode district: SP11
- Dialling code: 01264
- Police: Hampshire and Isle of Wight
- Fire: Hampshire and Isle of Wight
- Ambulance: South Central
- UK Parliament: North West Hampshire

Cottonworth is a hamlet in the Test Valley district of Hampshire, England. The village lies on the A3057 road between Andover and Romsey. According to the PostOffice the 2011 Census population was included in the civil parish of Wherwell. Its nearest town is Andover, which lies approximately 4 miles (6.4 km) north from the village.
