= Fullerton to Hurstbourne Line =

Railway line in Hampshire, England

The Fullerton Junction to Hurstbourne Line was a 6-mile railway line which ran between Fullerton Junction and Hurstbourne in Hampshire, UK. It was also known as the Longparish Branch and by the nickname of Nile Valley Railway.

The passenger service was withdrawn on 6 July 1931. The line was then used for freight only between Hurstbourne to Longparish until 1934 and Longparish to Fullerton Junction until 28 May 1956.

== Origins of the nickname ==
Nile Valley Railway was a nickname given to this line. It is believed the Victorians named it because of the anglers who visited the area to fish the River Test which has a reputation of being one of the finest trout rivers in the UK.

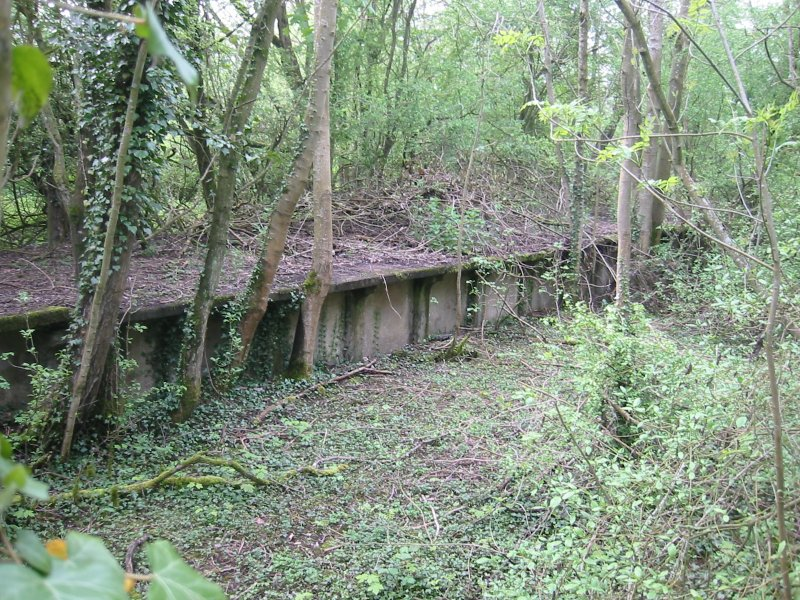
Remains of Fullerton Junction

== Operators ==
- London and South Western Railway 1885-1923
- Southern Railway 1923-1948
- British Railways 1948-1956

== History ==
This railway branch was completed as a double-track line in 1885. It was built by the London and South Western Railway in response to the planned Didcot, Newbury and Southampton Railway. The DN&SR, with the support of the L&SWR's rival the Great Western Railway, planned to build a main line route from the Midlands to Southampton in the heart of the L&SWR's territory, with its own terminus and an entirely separate line. The L&SWR was well aware that the DN&SR, like most start-up railway companies, was short of finances. It built 75 miles (121 km) Fullerton to Hurstbourne line to provide a complete line between Hurstbourne and Romsey. The L&SWR would offer the DN&SR the much cheaper alternative of building its line from Newbury to Hurstbourne, where its trains would then run on the new route along L&SWR track to the Southampton Terminus. The DN&SR would get its route to Southampton whilst the L&SWR would be able to exercise control over its competitor.

Since the Fullerton to Hurstbourne Line was intended to handle heavy freight and express passenger traffic from the Midlands via the DN&SR it was built with double tracks and large stations at Longparish and Wherwell complete with extensive goods yards. Despite the line's short length it included some substantial engineering, including a 50-foot (15.2m) deep cutting near Longparish.

In the event the DN&SR rejected the L&SWR's proposal and pushed on with its own independent route. Ironically construction of the line stalled for lack of funds at Winchester, but from there it was impossible to link with the Fullerton to Hurstbourne Line.

The L&SWR opened the Fullerton to Hurstbourne Line under its own operation on 1 July 1885 with three passenger trains a day operated by a locomotive and a single carriage shuttling between Fullerton and Whitchurch (the DN&SR had its own station at the latter village). By the 1890s the service had increased to 5 trains a day but the line remained lightly used. An attempt to reduce costs was made by introducing railmotors on the line in 1910. The line did serve a useful role as a diversionary route between Eastleigh and Southampton for special trains or during engineering works on the main line. Queen Victoria, attracted by the scenery surrounding the line, had the Royal Train sent down the line on several occasions when travelling between Windsor Castle and Osbourne House. It is rumoured that she preferred this route on the way to and from Osborne House because it did not involve passing through any tunnels.

By 1913 it was realised that the substantial investment put into building a line to main line standards would never be repaid on the light local traffic. The line was then reduced to a single-track line on 13 July 1913.

A saw mill near Longparish station employed more than 100 men between 1914 and 1919 and up to 30 wagons a day carried goods from the mill.

The passenger services was withdrawn on 6 July 1931.

During the Second World War, an ammunition storage depot was built near Longparish and the line handled a considerable amount of military traffic. The stores remained in place until 1953.

The freight service last ran on 28 May 1956, but the track remained and was used to store condemned vans and wagons. The line was taken out of use in April 1960, although a short section at Fullerton remained until 1 June 1964.

== See also ==
- Midland and South Western Junction Railway
- Sprat and Winkle Line
