= Horsebridge railway station =

Former railway station in England

Coordinates: 51.0716°N 1.5106°W

Horsebridge
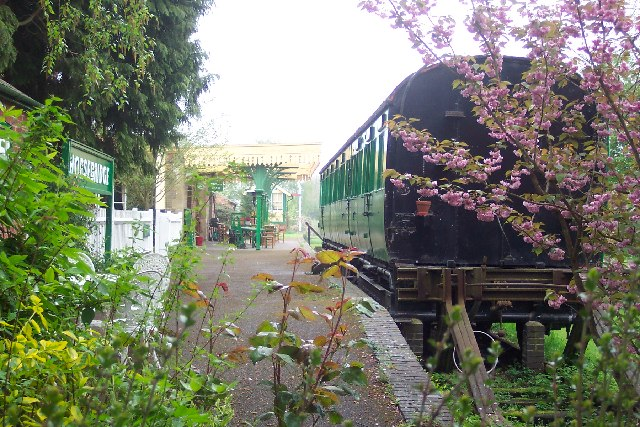

General information
- Location: Houghton, Test Valley, Hampshire; England
- Grid reference: SU344304
- Platforms: 2

Other information
- Status: Disused

History
- Pre-grouping: LSWR
- Post-grouping: Southern Railway; Southern Region of British Railways

Key dates
- 6 March 1865: Opened
- 7 September 1964: Closed
Location

Horsebridge was a railway station on the closed Sprat and Winkle Line which served the Hampshire village of Houghton. It closed in 1964, a casualty of the closure programme proposed by the Beeching Axe which sounded the death knell for many rural railway stations.

== Working years ==
The station, located six miles north of Romsey alongside the River Test in the Test Valley, was opened in 1865 by the London and South Western Railway as part of their "Sprat and Winkle Line" that connected Redbridge with Andover. The railway line was constructed over the abandoned Andover Canal.

The station assumed special significance during the First World War when it was used as a staging post for the transport of men, munitions, horses and equipment from Salisbury Plain which were sent to France via Southampton. Declining passenger numbers after the Second World War led to the line's eventual closure in 1964.

The station comprised three front rooms – the office, booking hall and waiting room, with the remainder of the property set aside for the stationmaster who had two bedrooms, a living room and kitchen at his disposal, but no bathroom.

| Preceding station | Disused railways | Following station |
|---|---|---|
| Stockbridge | British Rail; Southern Region; Sprat and Winkle Line | Mottisfont |

== Restoration ==
Following closure, the station remained empty and soon became derelict. Bricks and tiles were stolen by vandals and the former signalbox was dismantled and taken away by unknown persons. The station was even used by the local fire brigade who practised falling down through the floor.

Salvation came in the shape of Hampshire County Council's plan to turn the trackbed of the railway line into a footpath, the Test Way. In 1985 the derelict station was sold for £50,000 to Anthony and Valerie Charrington, a commercial property surveyor and professional singer, who obtained planning permission to convert the property into a two-bedroom dwelling subject to the condition that no swimming pool could be constructed in the gap between the platforms. The Charringtons undertook substantial works in an attempt to restore the station to how it would have looked during the Victorian era. In 1988 they purchased a 1922 third-class Southern Railway passenger carriage for £1,500 and spent £30,000 refurbishing and installing it on a set of reinstated tracks at the station. The carriage was subsequently used as a dining room. A replacement signalbox and signals were also purchased.

In 1991 once restoration had been completed, the station's former parcel office as well as the carriage were let out as holiday accommodation and as a venue for parties. The station was subsequently Grade II listed.

The station became so popular as a wedding venue that the Charringtons applied for planning permission to erect a marquee. This was, however, rejected by Test Valley Borough Council as an "undesirable and unsustainable development in the countryside". In March 2011 this application was successful on appeal and the station was subsequently marketed as a wedding venue.
