= Aughton, Wiltshire =

Hamlet in Wiltshire, England

Coordinates: 51.306°N 1.658°W

Aughton
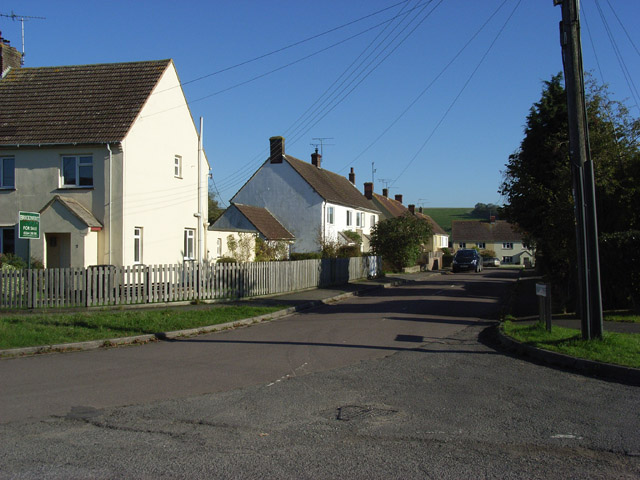
- Ham Close, Aughton

- Location within Wiltshire
- OS grid reference: SU239564
- Civil parish: Collingbourne Kingston
- Unitary authority: Wiltshire
- Ceremonial county: Wiltshire
- Region: South West
- Country: England
- Sovereign state: United Kingdom
- Post town: Marlborough
- Postcode district: SN8
- Dialling code: 01264
- Police: Wiltshire
- Fire: Dorset and Wiltshire
- Ambulance: South Western
- UK Parliament: East Wiltshire

Aughton is a hamlet adjacent to the village of Collingbourne Kingston in Wiltshire, England.

Aughton took its name from Aeffe, the owner in the 10th century. After Aeffe's death, the land passed to Hyde Abbey, Winchester, and the estate was merged with Collingbourne Kingston manor.

Aughton House is from the 17th century.
