= Whitchurch railway station (Hampshire) =

Railway station in Hampshire, England

Whitchurch (Hants)
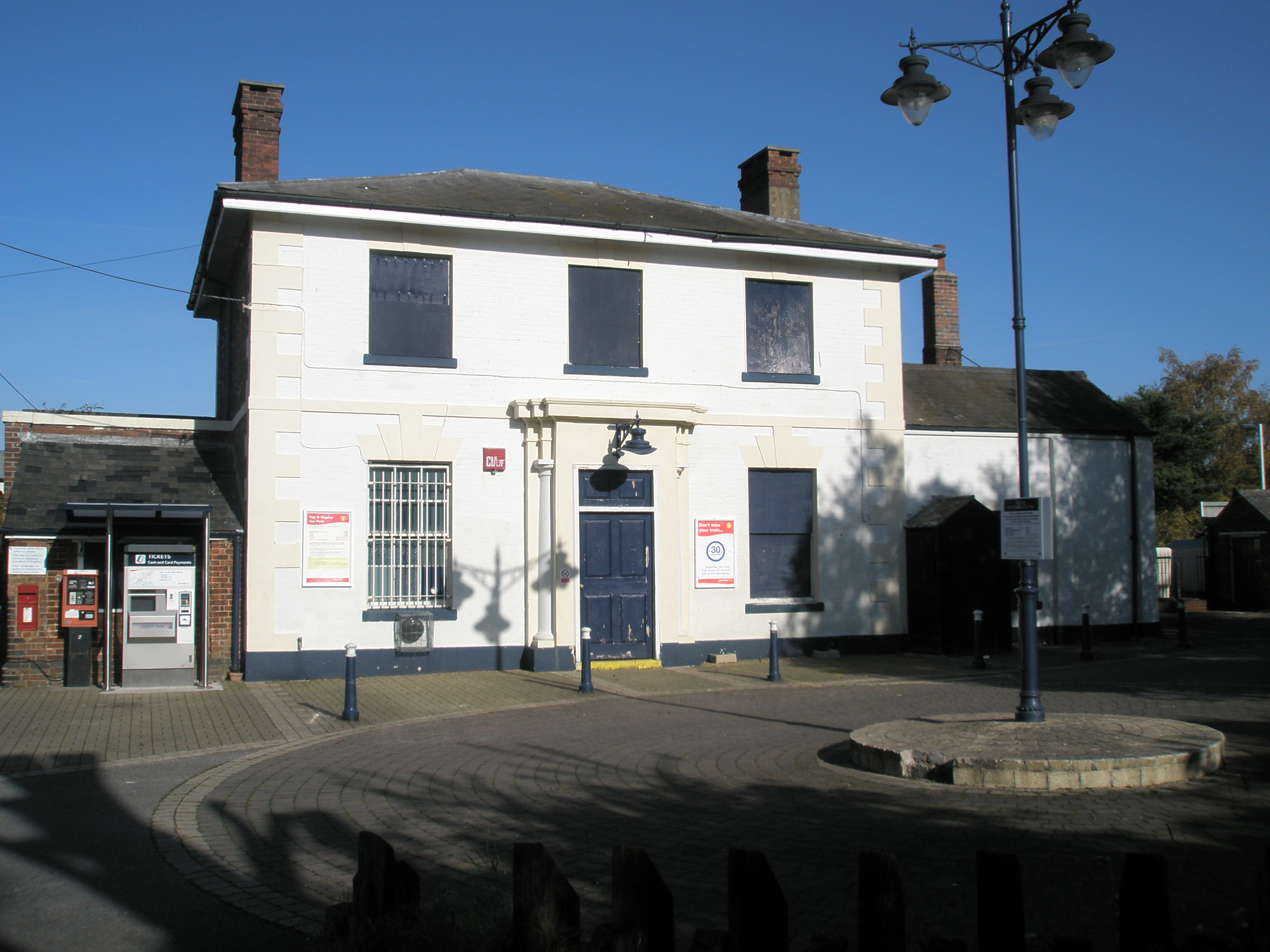
- The station building

General information
- Location: Whitchurch, Basingstoke and Deane, England
- Coordinates: 51.237°N 1.338°W
- Grid reference: SU463489
- Managed by: South Western Railway
- Platforms: 2

Other information
- Station code: WCH
- Classification: DfT category E

History
- Original company: London and South Western Railway
- Pre-grouping: London and South Western Railway
- Post-grouping: Southern Railway

Key dates
- 3 July 1854: Opened as Whitchurch
- 26 September 1949: Renamed Whitchurch North
- 2 October 1972: Renamed Whitchurch (Hants)

Passengers
- 2020/21: ▼48,286
- 2021/22: ▲0.124 million
- 2022/23: ▲0.179 million
- 2023/24: ▲0.223 million
- 2024/25: ▼0.201 million
Location
Notes
- Passenger statistics from the Office of Rail and Road

Whitchurch railway station serves the town of Whitchurch, in Hampshire, England. It is 59 miles 8 chains (95.1 km) down the line from London Waterloo on the West of England Main Line. The station is served and operated by South Western Railway.

== Facilities ==
The ticket office is open during the morning peak.

== Services ==
South Western Railway operates the following off-peak service:

- 1 train per hour to London Waterloo (stopping)
- 1 train per hour to Salisbury (stopping)

Additional services call at peak times, with extensions westward to either Yeovil Pen Mill or Exeter St Davids. Sunday trains call every two hours each way.

Preceding station	National Rail	Following station
Overton	South Western Railway; West of England Main Line	Andover
