= Collingbourne Kingston =

Village and civil parish in Wiltshire, England

Coordinates: 51.301°N 1.658°W

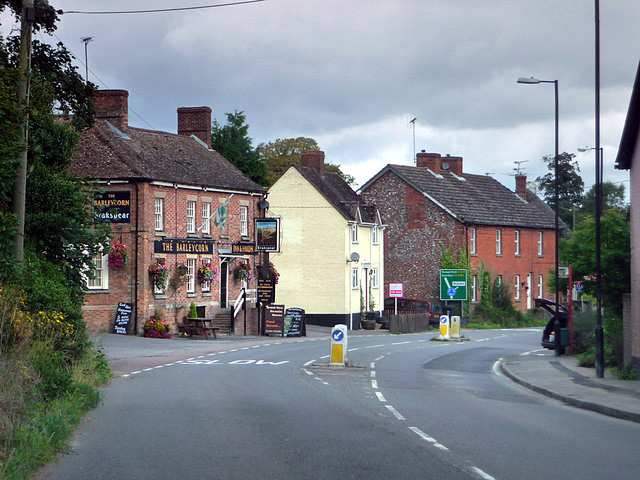
- A338 and the Barleycorn, 2009

- Location within Wiltshire
- Population: 511 (in 2011)
- OS grid reference: SU239558
- Civil parish: Collingbourne Kingston
- Unitary authority: Wiltshire
- Ceremonial county: Wiltshire
- Region: South West
- Country: England
- Sovereign state: United Kingdom
- Post town: Marlborough
- Postcode district: SN8
- Dialling code: 01264
- Police: Wiltshire
- Fire: Dorset and Wiltshire
- Ambulance: South Western
- UK Parliament: East Wiltshire
- Website: Parish Council

Collingbourne Kingston is a village and civil parish about 8 miles (13 km) south of the market town of Marlborough in Wiltshire, England. The village, which is on the A338 primary route between Andover and Marlborough, is one of several on the River Bourne, a seasonal river which is usually dry in summer. The parish includes the hamlets of Aughton and Brunton.

The toponym Collingbourne means the "Bourne as the stream of Cola's people". Collingbourne Kingston was so named to distinguish it from its southerly neighbour Collingbourne Ducis. Until the 14th century, Collingbourne Kingston was called Collingbourne Abbot's with reference to Hyde Abbey, Winchester, the owner of the principal manor. The change to Kingston was a reference to the appearance of Collingbourne in the Domesday Book.

== Local government ==
The civil parish elects a parish council. It is in the area of Wiltshire Council unitary authority, which performs most significant local government functions.

The parish originally contained Collingbourne Kingston, Aughton, Brunton, Sunton, and part of Cadley hamlet. In 1934 Sunton and the part of Cadley were transferred to Collingbourne Ducis, and in 1987 the parish was further reduced when its southeast and southwest parts were also transferred to Collingbourne Ducis.

== Amenities ==
The village has a garage. There is no post office in the village. The nearest post offices are in Collingbourne Ducis and Burbage. The nearest supermarkets are in Ludgershall, Tidworth and Pewsey.

The village has a public house with accommodation, the Barleycorn Inn, an early 19th-century coaching inn. The establishment was previously known as the Cleaver and prior to that, the Kingston Hotel.

Collingbourne Kingston had two public houses until the 1980s; the Windmill Inn is now a private house.

== Education ==
The former school, now a bed and breakfast establishment called "The Old School House", was opened in 1845 and served the children of the local farmworkers and craftsmen. It was ahead of its time as universal education was not introduced until thirty years later. The school closed in 1978 and primary age children now attend the school in neighbouring Collingbourne Ducis.

Children of secondary school age are able to attend Pewsey Vale School, The Wellington Academy in Ludgershall and St John's in Marlborough.

== Church and chapel ==
The Church of England parish church of Saint Mary is in the centre of the village. In 1344 its dedicatee was Saint John the Baptist but by 1763 it was dedicated to St. Mary. In 1862 it was altered and extensively restored by John Colson. It is an 11th-century Norman building and there is a possibility that it stands on the site of an earlier Saxon church. The oldest features of the church are the round Norman pillars in the nave. Each has a different capital, one with a lady facing the south door. There are four arches to the southern arcade, but only three to the northern one. There is also a canonical sundial on the south wall.

The 13th and 14th centuries gave the church its ornate chancel arch, with four depths of moulded spandrels and foliage capitals set on Purbeck marble piers. An engraving of the church in 1806 shows the original lower ridge of the nave roof, giving a better proportion to its relationship with the fine tower with its carved pinnacles and strange gargoyles. At that time there were only four round clerestory windows on each side of the north and south walls of the nave. In the 1860s the roof was raised and the clerestory windows increased to six on each side; Pevsner writes "The clerestory windows, however, are Victorian, of an oddly playful kind, quite out of keeping with the church or Wiltshire – pentagon and hexagon surrounds and cinquefoils and sexfoils".

The Conacher two manual, 1210 pipe organ came from the parish church of Lavenham, Suffolk in 1997. It was blessed by the Bishop of Salisbury who then played a piece by Bach on it. The huge canopied Pile family tomb stands to the right of the altar, and therein lie Gabriel Pile who died in 1626, and his wife Anne. The tower has six bells, the oldest from 1614; the old second bell stands in retirement in the south aisle.

The church is a Grade II* listed building and today forms part of the Savenake grouping of parishes.

Further south in the village is a Wesleyan Methodist chapel built in 1914 to replace an earlier chapel building of 1819. The chapel closed in 1985 and became a private home.

== Former railway ==
The Swindon, Marlborough and Andover Railway was opened through the Bourne valley in 1882, becoming the Midland and South Western Junction Railway in 1884 and part of the Great Western Railway in 1923. The line passed close to the east of Collingbourne Kingston and there was a station at Collingbourne Ducis. In 1932 an unstaffed station, Collingbourne Kingston Halt , was opened where the line passed under the road to Brunton, to compete with road transport. The halt closed when the line was closed to passengers in 1961, and subsequently the track was removed.

== Air crash ==
In 1943 a Spitfire aircraft crashed in the village, destroying the roof of a thatched cottage. The American pilot serving with the Air Transport Auxiliary, Hazel Jane Raines, was injured.

== Twinning Association ==
Collingbourne and District are twinned with Le Merlerault in Normandy, France. The twinning agreement was made on 18 April 1992.
