= Wherwell =

Village and parish in Hampshire, England

Coordinates: 51.166°N 1.445°W

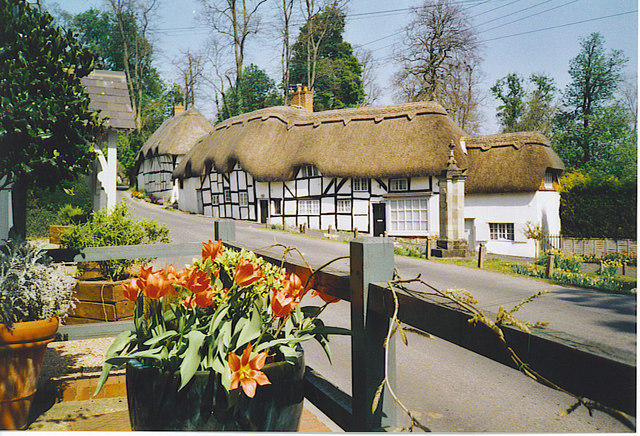

- Location within Hampshire
- Population: 473 (2011 Census including Cottonworth, Fullerton, South Harewood and Upper Enham)
- OS grid reference: SU3891840929
- Civil parish: Wherwell
- District: Test Valley
- Shire county: Hampshire
- Region: South East
- Country: England
- Sovereign state: United Kingdom
- Post town: ANDOVER
- Postcode district: SP11
- Dialling code: 01794
- Police: Hampshire and Isle of Wight
- Fire: Hampshire and Isle of Wight
- Ambulance: South Central
- UK Parliament: Romsey and Southampton North

Wherwell is a village on the River Test in Hampshire, England. The name may derive from its bubbling springs resulting in the Middle Ages place name “Hwerwyl” noted in AD 955, possibly meaning “kettle springs” or “cauldron springs.” Pronunciation of the name has ranged from “Hurrell” to “Wer-rel” to present-day “Wher-well.”

Before the Dissolution, the parish of Wherwell was in the hands of an important abbey of Benedictine nuns, whose abbess was Lady of the Manor of an area much larger than the existing parish.

The village is associated with the Cockatrice. The story is that the cockatrice terrorised the village until it was imprisoned in the dungeons below Wherwell Priory. A prize of land was offered to anyone who could kill the creature. None were successful, until a man named Green lowered a mirror into the dungeon. The cockatrice battled against its own reflection until exhausted, at which point Green was able to kill it. Today there is an area of land near Wherwell called Green's Acres. For many years a weather vane in the shape of a cockatrice adorned the C19 church of St. Peter and Holy Cross in Wherwell until it was removed to Andover Museum.

The River Test (which has more than one channel nearby, and a wide flood plain) flows through the village in parallel with the High Street. Several cottages in the village are thatched, some dating from C16.

The village had an inn called "The White Lion Inn", which is currently closed for refurbishment at September 2024. The village is home to a primary school, Wherwell Primary School.

== Gallery ==
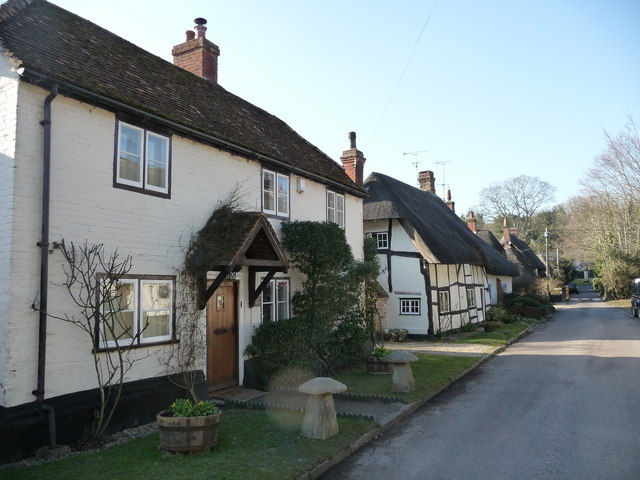
Church Street

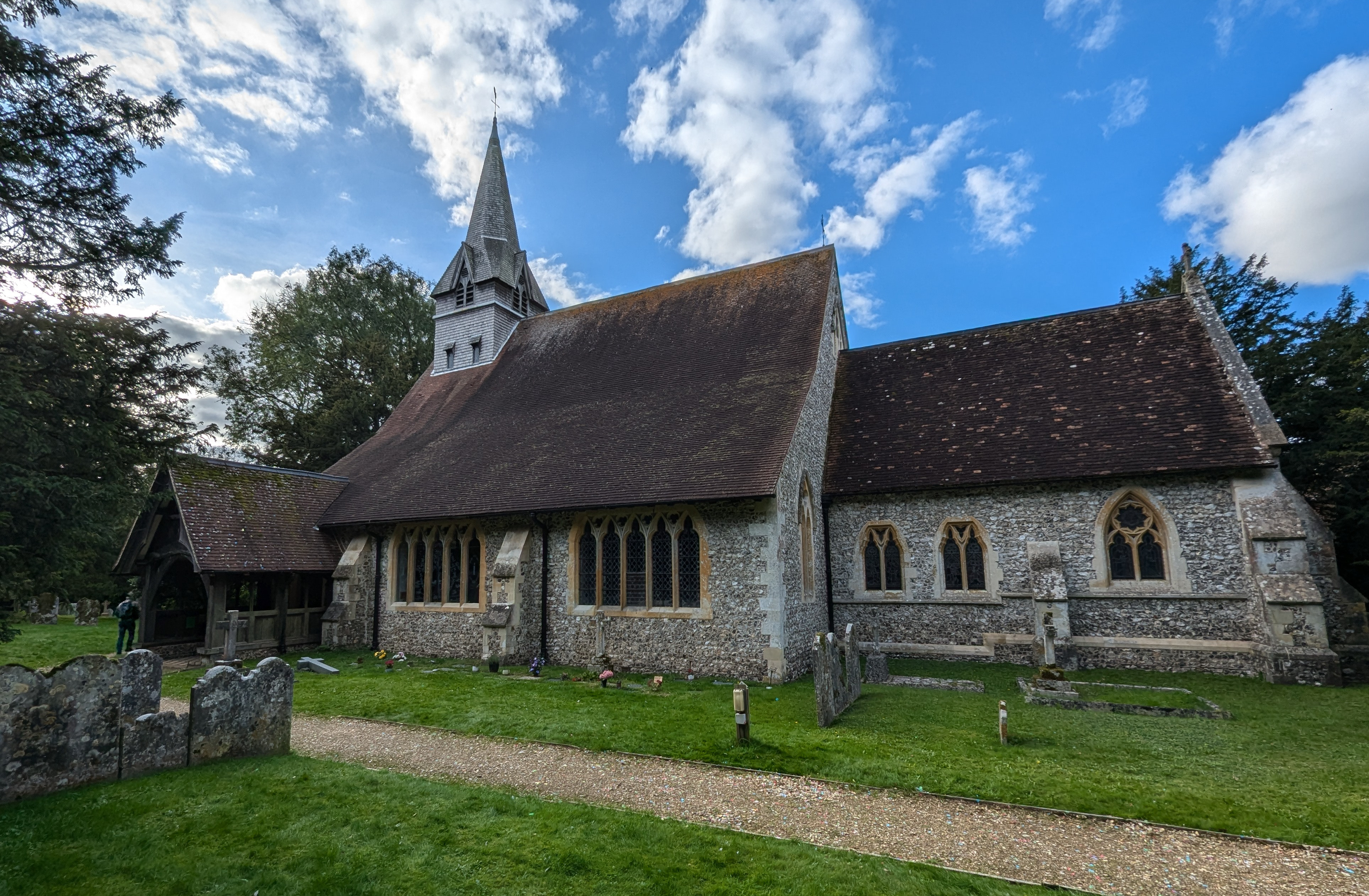
The C19 church of St Peter and Holy Cross
