= Andover railway station (England) =

Railway station in Hampshire, England

Coordinates: 51.212°N 1.492°W

Andover
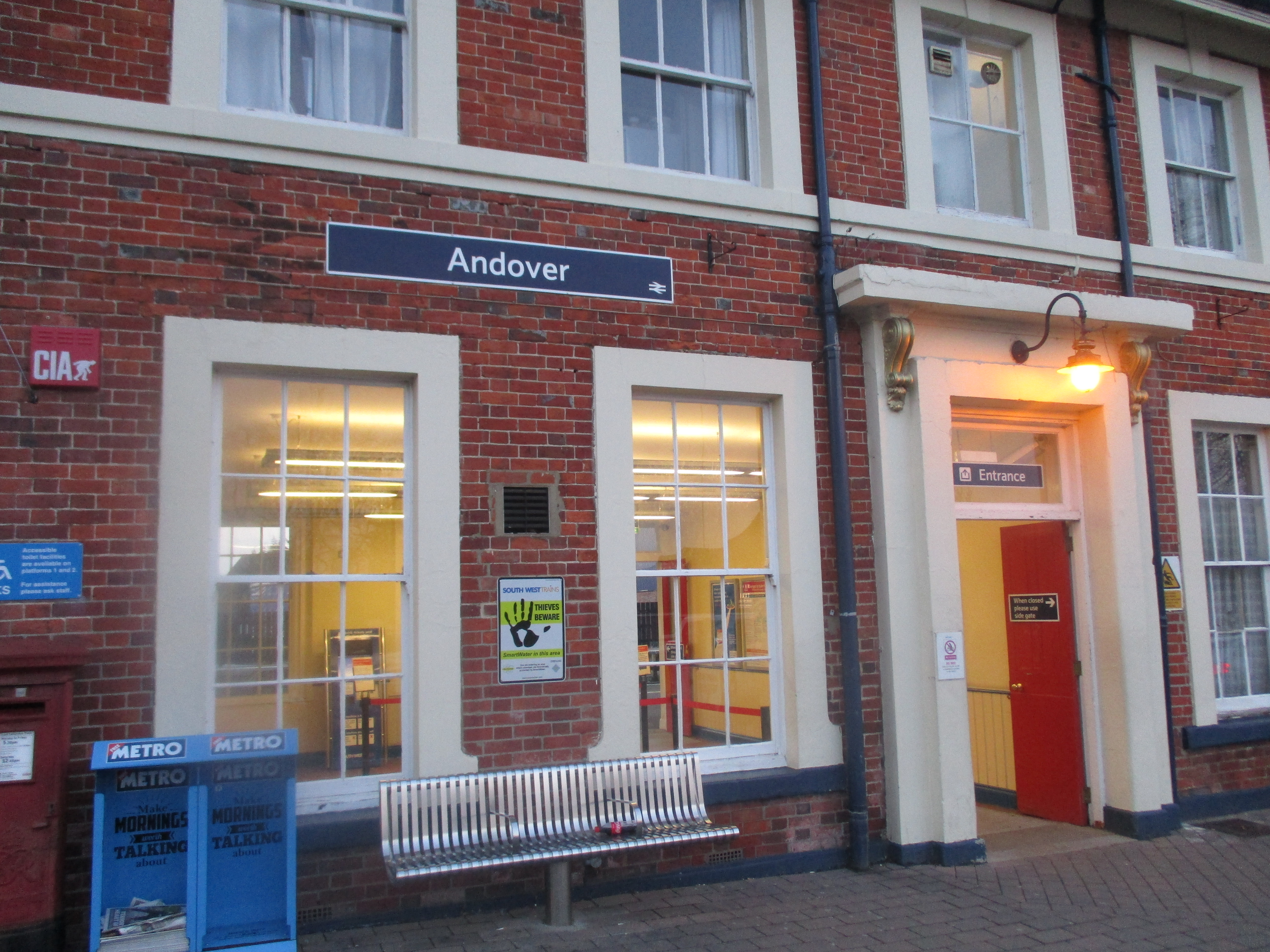
- Andover station exterior

General information
- Location: Andover, Test Valley; England
- Grid reference: SU355459
- Managed by: South Western Railway
- Platforms: 2

Other information
- Station code: ADV
- Classification: DfT category C1

Key dates
- 3 July 1854: Opened as Andover
- 6 March 1865: Renamed Andover Junction
- 7 November 1964: Renamed Andover

Passengers
- 2020/21: ▼0.268 million
- Interchange: ▼208
- 2021/22: ▲0.709 million
- Interchange: ▲736
- 2022/23: ▲0.922 million
- Interchange: ▲16,134
- 2023/24: ▲1.024 million
- Interchange: ▼4,323
- 2024/25: ▲1.141 million
- Interchange: ▲7,053
Location
Notes
- Passenger statistics from the Office of Rail and Road

Andover railway station serves the town of Andover, Hampshire, England. The station is served and operated by South Western Railway. It is 66 miles 19 chains (106.6 km) down the line from London Waterloo on the West of England line.

== History ==
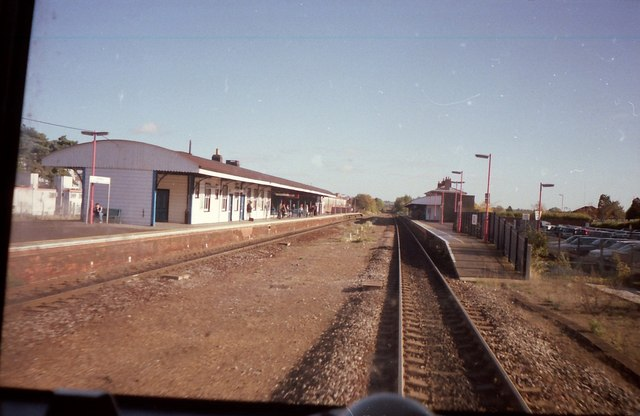
The station viewed from the cab of a train in 1995

The station was opened on 3 July 1854. It was named Andover Junction (distinguishing from Andover Town) between 1865 and 1964, as it stood at the junction of the Exeter-London line and the now-defunct Midland and South Western Junction Railway running between Cheltenham, Swindon, Andover and Southampton Terminus. Before opening, the nearest station (since 1840) had been Andover Road station at Micheldever, some 12 miles to the east, which was renamed Micheldever two years after Andover station opened.

The LSWR opened a small locomotive depot a short distance past the junction in 1854, which was damaged in 1856 by a locomotive boiler explosion. The Swindon Marlborough and Andover Railway (SM&AR) also built a depot next to the station in 1882.

== Facilities ==
Station facilities include a ticket office, a heated waiting room, three self-service ticket machines and a small shop. There is a car park and taxi rank along with bicycle storage spaces.

== Platform layout ==
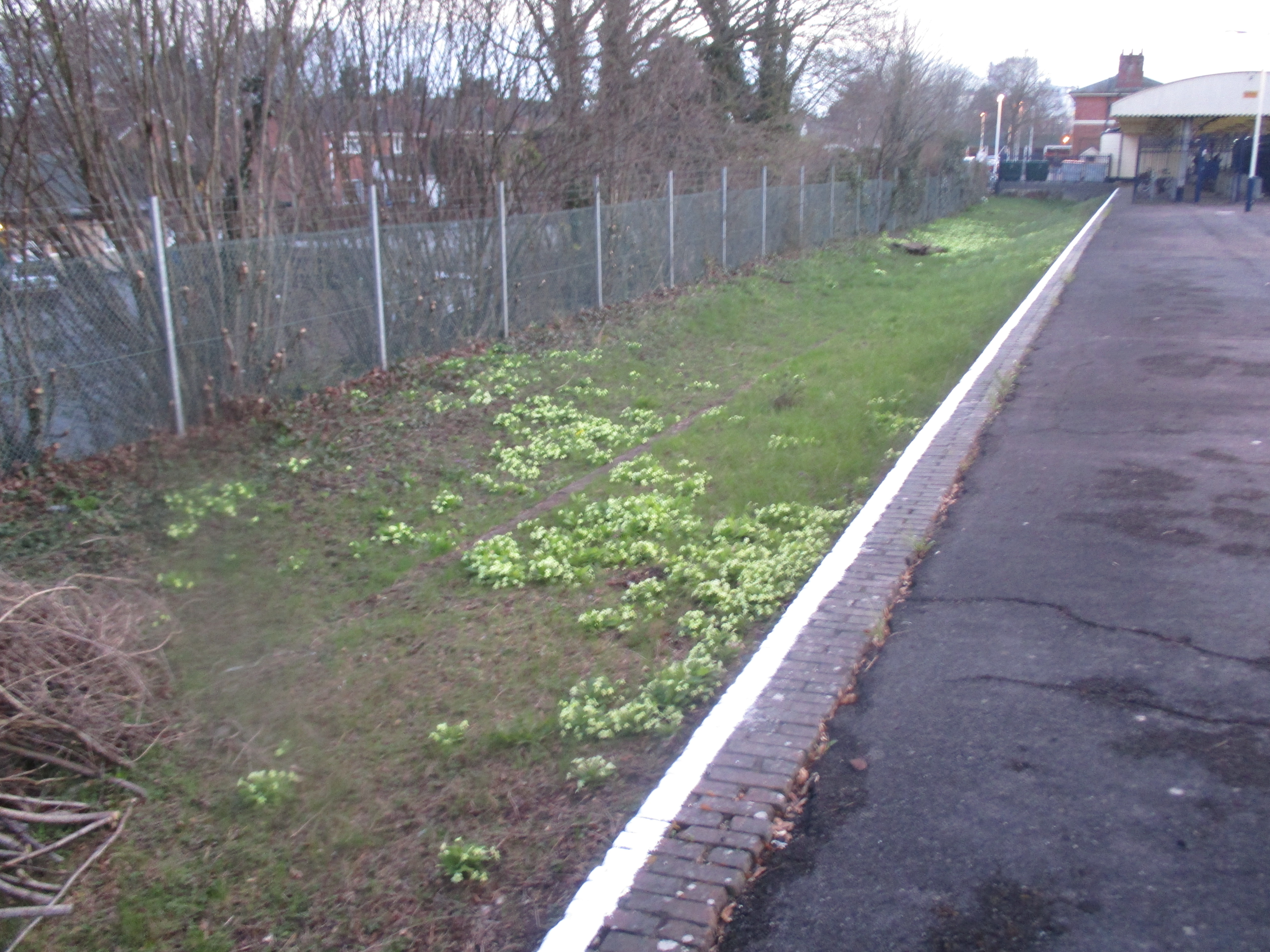
A disused platform at the east end of the station

There are two disused platforms, either side of the two current platforms (which are on either side of the through lines). The first is a bay platform on the east side of platform 2, which used to serve as the platform to Romsey on the Sprat and Winkle Line until the line was closed. The second is on the other side of the island to platform 1, which used to serve as the platform to Swindon on the Midland and South Western Junction Railway. This platform still has tracks, as it is used for military purposes to link with the depot in Ludgershall. Beyond this are disused sidings.

== Passenger volume ==
According to the Office of Rail Regulation Statistics on Rail Trends, in 2019–2020, 1,152,576 exits and entries were made at Andover station, making it the 15th most used railway station in the county of Hampshire (including the unitary authority areas of Portsmouth City Council and Southampton City Council).

Passenger Volume at Andover
	2002–03	2004–05	2005–06	2006–07	2007–08	2008–09	2009–10	2010–11	2011–12	2012–13	2013–14	2014–15	2015–16	2016–17	2017–18	2018–19	2019–20	2020–21	2021–22	2022–23
Entries and exits	833,452	982,255	990,989	1,014,898	1,041,364	1,070,908	1,030,838	1,089,684	1,135,300	1,123,736	1,179,202	1,178,074	1,205,858	1,225,902	1,198,536	1,232,336	1,152,576	267,620	709,312	921,726
Interchanges	– (Note: No data available.)	738	689	677	811	809	1,023	874	1,050	1,108	1,191	1,207	1,223	1,121	1,135	848	975	208	736	16,134

The statistics cover twelve month periods that start in April.

== Services ==
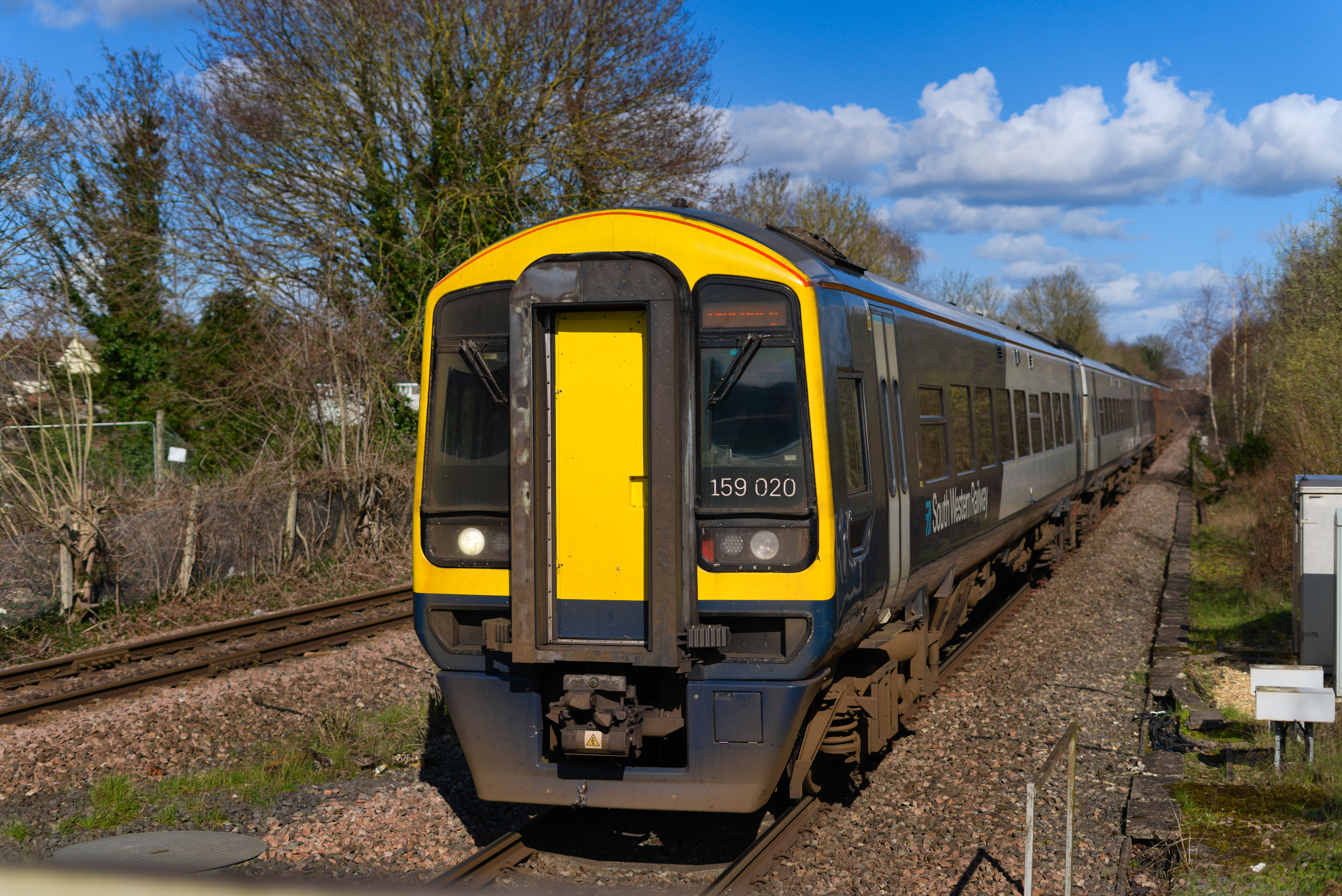
A train bound for Salisbury in 2026

South Western Railway is the sole operator at Andover. The basic Monday to Saturday service pattern is as follows:

- 1 train per hour between London Waterloo and Salisbury, semi fast between London Waterloo and Basingstoke, then calling all stations between Basingstoke and Salisbury.
- 1 train per hour between London Waterloo and Exeter St Davids, semi fast between London Waterloo and Salisbury, then calling all stations except St James Park between Salisbury and Exeter St Davids.

There are also a limited number of services between London Waterloo and Yeovil Pen Mill via Westbury.

On Sundays, service is similar, although the slower services are instead diverted to serve Reading rather than London Waterloo.

Preceding station	National Rail	Following station
Basingstoke	South Western Railway; London-Exeter fast services	Salisbury
Whitchurch	South Western Railway; London-Salisbury stopping services	Grateley
	Disused railways	
Andover Town	Midland and South Western Junction Railway	Weyhill

== Bibliography ==
- Body, G. (1984), PSL Field Guides – Railways of the Southern Region, Patrick Stephens Ltd, Cambridge, ISBN 0-85059-664-5
- Butt, R. V. J. (October 1995). The Directory of Railway Stations: details every public and private passenger station, halt, platform and stopping place, past and present (1st ed.). Sparkford: Patrick Stephens Ltd. ISBN 978-1-85260-508-7. OCLC 60251199. OL 11956311M.
- Jowett, Alan (2000). Jowett's Nationalised Railway Atlas (1st ed.). Penryn, Cornwall: Atlantic Transport Publishers. ISBN 978-0-906899-99-1. OCLC 228266687.
- Quick, Michael (2023). Railway Passenger Stations in Great Britain: A Chronology (PDF) (5th ed.). London: Railway and Canal Historical Society.
