= Sprat and Winkle Line =

Former Andover–Redbridge railway

The Sprat and Winkle Line was the common name of the Andover to Redbridge railway line which ran between Andover and Redbridge in Hampshire, England. In the Romsey area it joined, and then left, the Salisbury to Southampton line. It was built by the Andover and Redbridge Railway (A&RR), which was incorporated in 1858. In 1863 the uncompleted railway was taken over by the London and South Western Railway (LSWR), which opened the line in 1865. The line had been conceived as part of a trunk route from Manchester to Southampton, but when the Midland and South Western Junction Railway (M&SWJR) opened, the anticipated long-distance traffic was disappointing.

The M&SWJR line closed in 1961 and the Andover line was unable to survive on purely local traffic. The part from Andover to Romsey (Kimbridge Junction) closed to passengers in 1964, and completely in 1967. The section from Romsey to Redbridge had become part of the line from Salisbury to Southampton; it remains in use at the present day.

== History ==
=== False starts ===
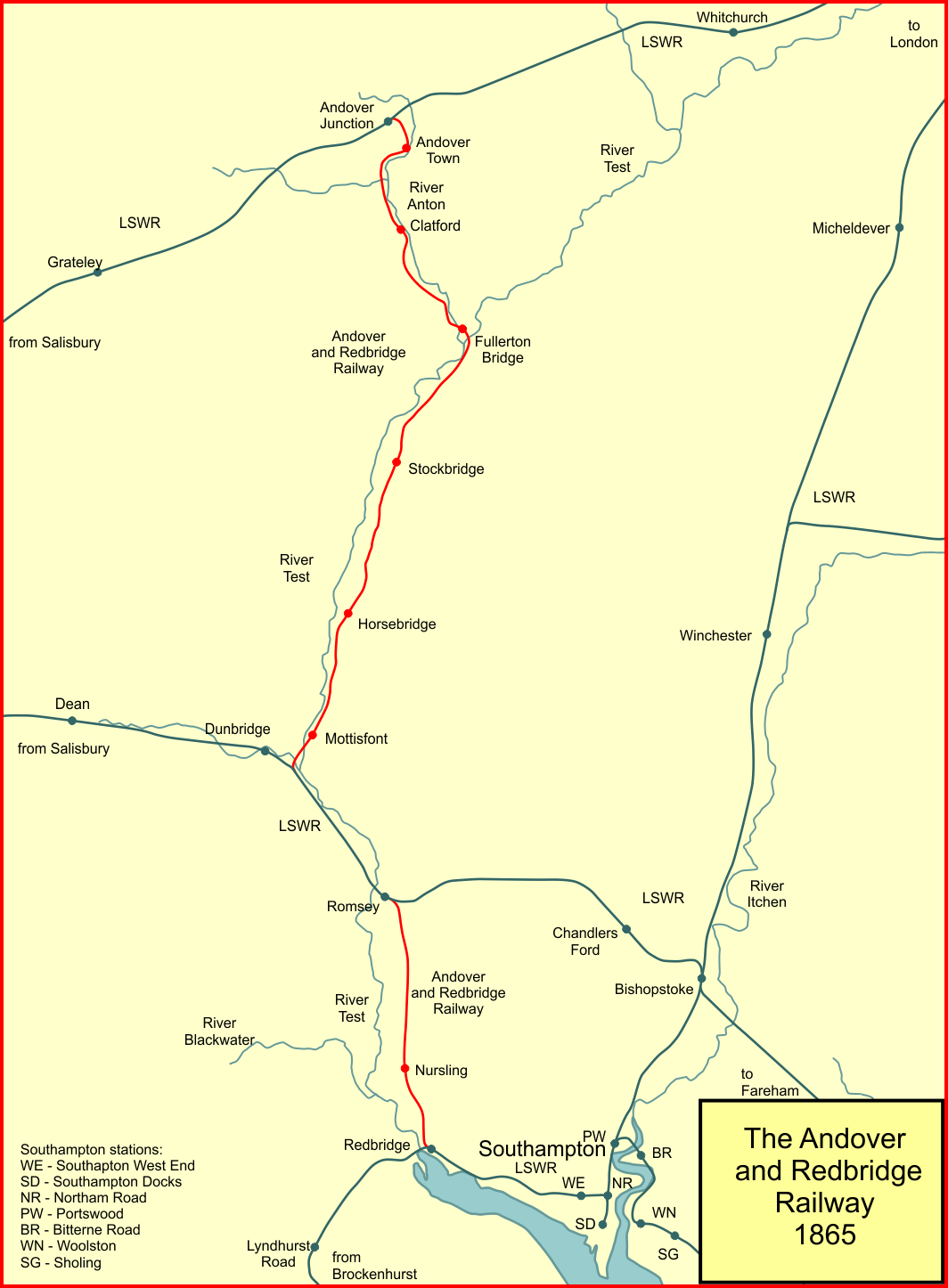
The Andover and Redbridge Railway network

The Andover Canal was fully completed in 1794, running from near Andover to Redbridge. It never paid a dividend. A writer commented that "traffic carried on by means of this canal is very trifling".

Southampton was an important international port, and a railway connection from Manchester was proposed by promoters of the Manchester and Southampton Railway in 1845. It would run through Andover and they agreed to buy the Andover Canal for £30,000, to use its route. The LSWR's line was from London to Southampton, with a branch line from Bishopstoke (later named Eastleigh) to Gosport. Already in 1846 the allied Southampton and Dorchester Railway was being promoted, extending westward from Southampton. In 1846 the LSWR proposed a branch line from Redbridge (on the unbuilt Dorchester line) to Romsey, also using the bed of the Andover Canal. During the parliamentary process for authorisation, this was turned down by a Commons committee in favour of the Manchester and Southampton Railway scheme, which would cover similar ground around Romsey but had much greater strategic significance. However, in subsequent hearings in the Lords Committee, the Manchester scheme was also rejected.

=== Authorisation and opening ===
London and South Western Railway (Andover and Southampton Junction Railway) Act 1847
- Act of Parliament
- Parliament of the United Kingdom
- Long title: An Act to enable the London and South-western Railway Company to make Railways from Andover to join their Salisbury Branch Railway at Michaelmarsh, and from the same Branch at Romsey to join the Southampton and Dorchester Railway at Redbridge, all in the County of Southampton, to be called "The Andover and Southampton Junction Railway."
- Citation: 10 & 11 Vict. c. cxv

Dates
- Royal assent: 2 July 1847

Text of statute as originally enacted

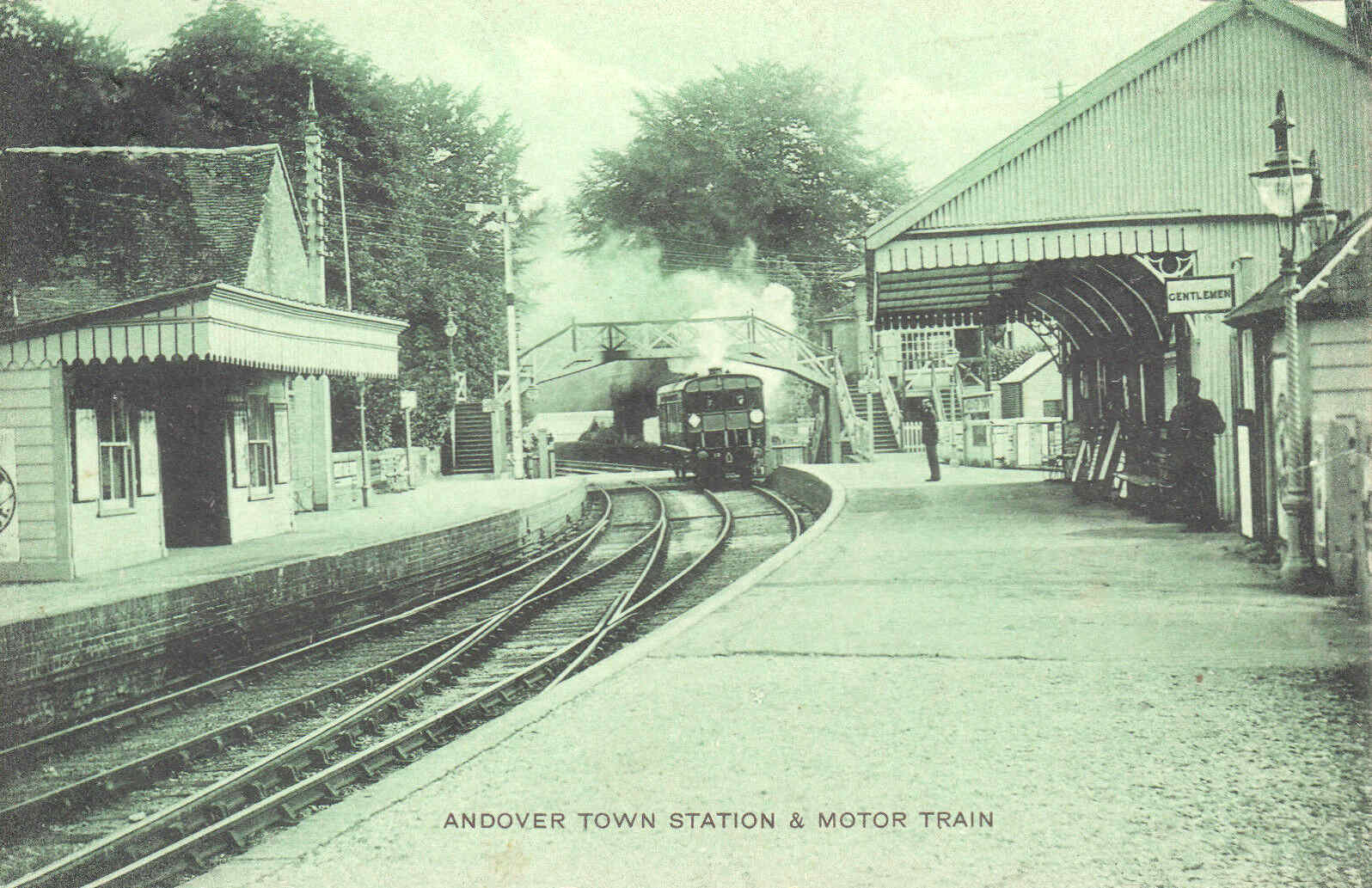
Andover Town and rail motor train

After the parliamentary battle the LSWR came to an agreement with the Manchester directors: the Manchester line would stop at Andover, and the LSWR would build the line from Andover to Southampton. The Manchester company would have unrestricted access over the LSWR line. On 2 July 1847 the London and South Western Railway obtained powers to build the line in the London and South Western Railway (Andover and Southampton Junction Railway) Act 1847 (10 & 11 Vict. c. cxv), but in fact the financial collapse following the Railway Mania resulted in complete inability to start the construction.

Andover and Redbridge Railway Act 1858
- Act of Parliament
- Parliament of the United Kingdom
- Long title: An Act to authorize the Construction of a Railway from Andover to Redbridge in the County of Southampton, and for that Purpose to convert the Andover Canal into a Railway.
- Citation: 21 & 22 Vict. c. lxxxii

Dates
- Royal assent: 12 July 1858

Andover and Redbridge Railway Act 1860
- Act of Parliament
- Parliament of the United Kingdom
- Long title: An Act to authorize certain Deviations in the Andover and Redbridge Railway, and for other Purposes.
- Citation: 23 & 24 Vict. c. l

Dates
- Royal assent: 15 May 1860

Text of statute as originally enacted

Andover and Redbridge Railway Amendment Act 1862
- Act of Parliament
- Parliament of the United Kingdom
- Long title: An Act for conferring further Powers upon the Andover and Redbridge Railway Company.
- Citation: 25 & 26 Vict. c. clxxvii

Dates
- Royal assent: 29 July 1862

Text of statute as originally enacted

Because of its importance as a port, Southampton continued to be an objective for other lines. The continuing decline in the profitability of the canal led to its proprietors forming a proposed Andover Canal Railway company, later changed to the Andover and Redbridge Railway Company. This was done with the connivance of the Great Western Railway (GWR) and it was assumed that the line would be broad gauge, and might connect to the GWR at Pewsey. A tussle followed between the LSWR and the GWR, but finally the LSWR took possession, and the line would be narrow (standard) gauge. On 12 July 1858 the Andover and Redbridge Railway was authorised by Parliament in the Andover and Redbridge Railway Act 1858 (21 & 22 Vict. c. lxxxii).

Andover and Redbridge and South Western Railways Act 1863
- Act of Parliament
- Parliament of the United Kingdom
- Long title: An Act for authorizing the making and maintaining of Lines of Railway to connect the Andover and Redbridge Railway with the London and South-western Railway, and for the Amalgamation of the Andover and Redbridge Railway with the London and South-western Railway; and for other Purposes.
- Citation: 26 & 27 Vict. c. cix

Dates
- Royal assent: 29 June 1863

Text of statute as originally enacted

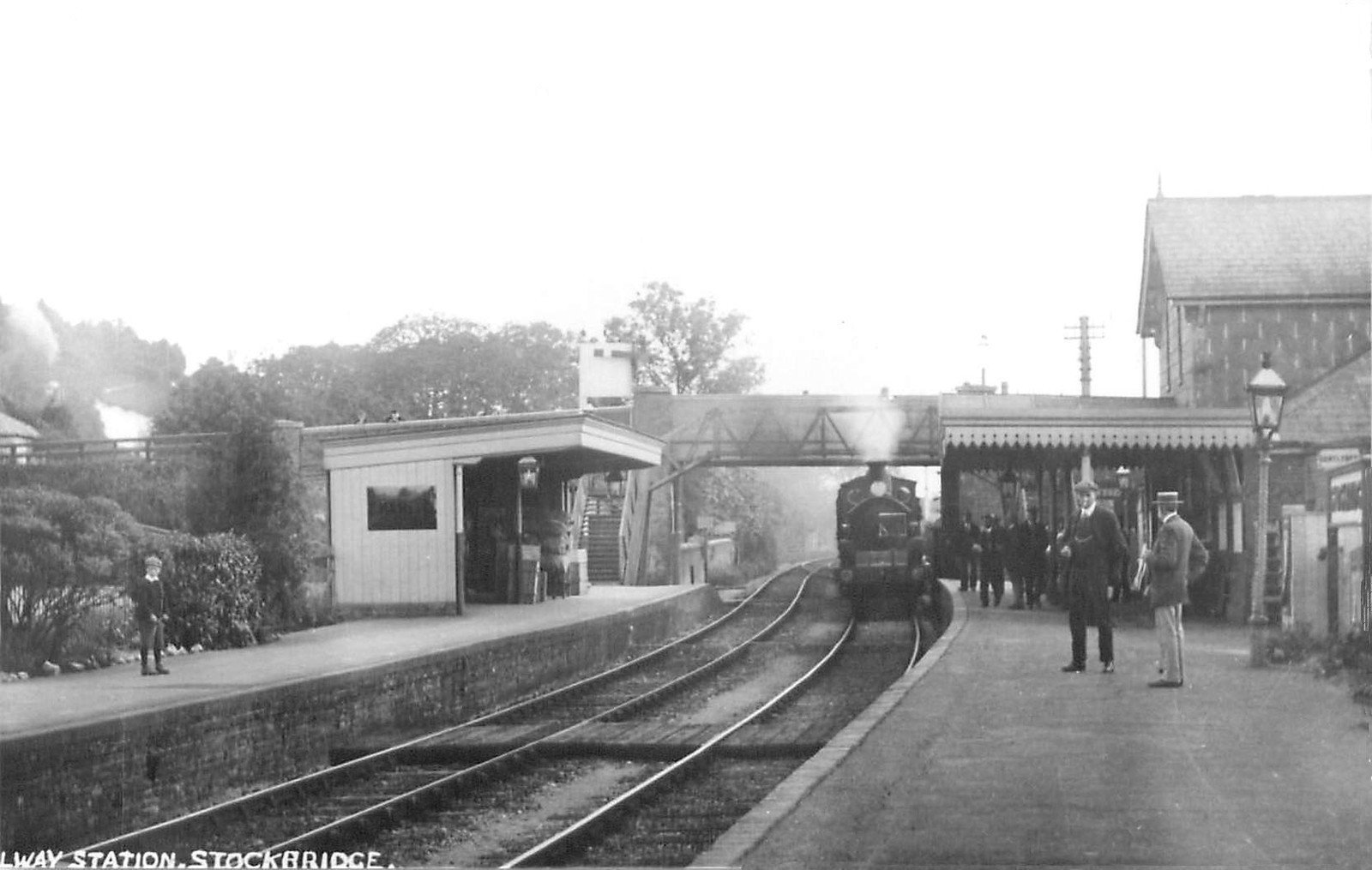
Stockbridge station

The Prime Minister, Lord Palmerston, cut the first sod on 28 September 1859, accompanied by an eleven gun salute; Palmerston had an estate at Broadlands, near Romsey. (Note: From Moreton; other writers give slightly different dates and a different number of guns.) The A&RR went on to propose an extension from Redbridge to Southampton Royal Docks. However actually securing the necessary share subscriptions proved extremely difficult, and several successive acts of Parliament extended the time limit for completion of the construction, and permitted the cancellation of forfeited shares. This situation dragged on between the A&RR and the LSWR with mutually hostile proposals, until the LSWR acquired the local company, by the Andover and Redbridge and South Western Railways Act 1863 (26 & 27 Vict. c. cix) of 29 June 1863, absorbing it and converting the authorised track gauge to the narrow (standard) gauge. The LSWR adopted the debts of the Andover company and guaranteed a 3% annuity on the outlays already made. Now that the Andover line was no longer to be broad gauge, it could use the existing Salisbury line between Kimbridge Junction and Romsey.

The line was opened on 6 March 1865 as a single line. There were four trains each way daily, one of which was mixed passenger and goods; there was an additional Southampton to Romsey trip. There was one passenger train each way on Sundays. The trains called at all stations, taking 90 minutes for the 28 miles journey; the mixed trains took two hours.

The line had been built closely following the route of the canal, which included many extremely tight curves; but the alignment of the route was eased by alignment works associated with the provision of double track, completed in November 1885.

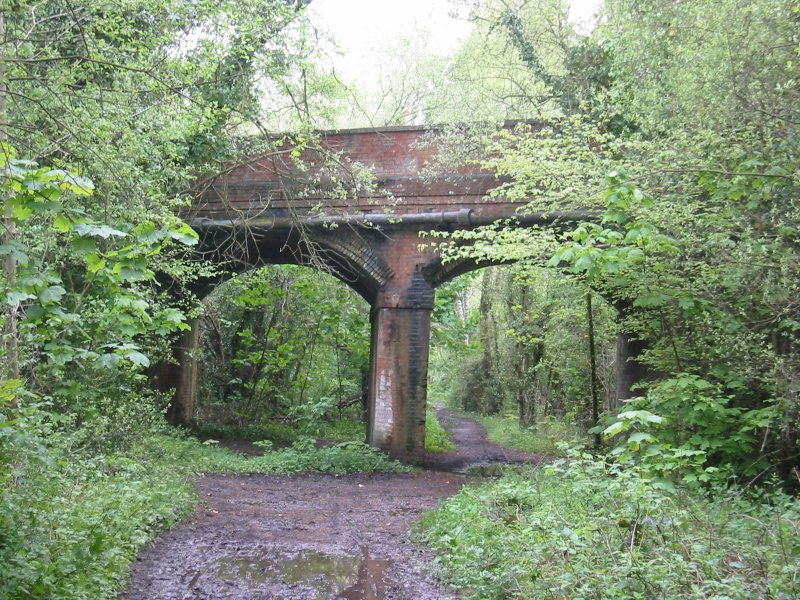
Route of Sprat and Winkle Line near Fullerton

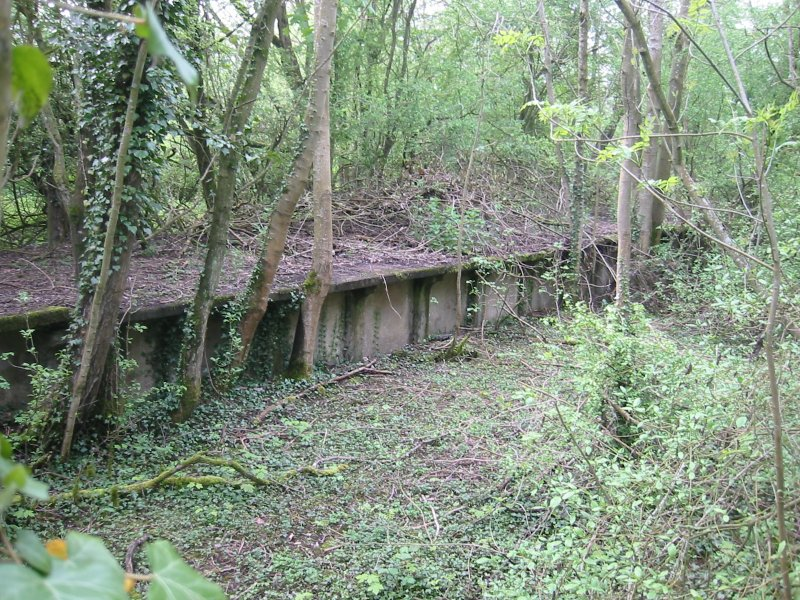
Remains of Fullerton Junction

=== Neighbouring lines ===
Also in 1885 a new line, the Fullerton to Hurstbourne Line from Hurstbourne Junction, on the main line from Basingstoke to Andover, to Fullerton was opened. Although really of purely local significance, this enabled diversion of trains bound for Southampton away from the congested route via Eastleigh.

The completion of the Midland and South Western Junction Railway to Andover in 1891 (Note: The connection at Andover had been made earlier, but 1891 is the first date when the northern connection was complete.) enabled the final realisation of the original Manchester and Southampton Railway objective, of enabling through journeys from northern towns and cities to Southampton.

=== Proposed north to west curve at Redbridge ===
On the map attached to Moreton's article, a dotted line is marked, showing a north to west curve at Redbridge, which would have enabled direct running from Romsey towards Brockenhurst. It is marked "proposed loop". There is nothing in Moreton's text about this and it was never made.

== 1895 timetable ==
The 1895 Bradshaw timetable showed five ordinary trains each way on weekdays and two on Sundays. These appear to have run to Southampton Docks via Redbridge. (The Bradshaw public timetables are often ambiguous about whether journeys were through or by connecting train.) In addition there were, on weekdays limited stop trains at 14:06 from Southampton and 17:15 from Andover Junction. These were daily through trains between Sheffield and Southampton, running over the M&SWJR line and designated South Express and North Express respectively.

On Saturday mornings, there was an American and Cape Lines Express, at 02:05 from Derby, 07:17 from Andover Junction, and non-stop from there to Southampton West End. At Derby it appears to connect out of an Up overnight "Scotch Express" but it is not clear if there were through coaches.

== Traffic in the 1960s ==
White, writing in 1961, described the traffic pattern:

The market town of Romsey, at the crossroads of the Eastleigh-Salisbury and Southampton-Andover lines, has a population of 6,300 and is the only place of any consequence between the Southampton and the West of England trunk lines… Because of the growth of traffic, local and through, in the area between Portsmouth and Salisbury, and because of the need to call at Southampton Central, a frequent service is supplied via Netley, Southampton and Redbridge to Romsey and thence to Salisbury. And instead of continuing to Salisbury as was once the case, the trains running via Eastleigh now mainly run beside the pretty River Test with its thatched fishermen’s huts, to Andover and Andover Junction. Romsey station has become very busy since all local services were dieselized in 1958-9 and substantially increased; in addition there are through steam-hauled services from Brighton and Portsmouth which travel via Southampton and Romsey to Salisbury, on their way to Plymouth, Bristol or South Wales. Through freight traffic, including coal, is also heavy between Salisbury and Southampton.

== Decline and closure ==
The line remained rural in nature, and the Midland and South Western Junction line never developed as a busy trunk route, closing in 1961. The Andover and Redbridge line had only the residual local traffic from small communities, and the Andover to Romsey (Kimbridge Junction) section closed in September 1964. The section from Romsey to Redbridge remains in use, now carrying the Southampton to Salisbury traffic, although Nursling station has been closed.

== Later use ==
Much of the route between Chilbolton and Kimbridge is now used by the Test Way long-distance footpath, and is also part of the Sustrans National Cycle Network.

== Possible origins of the name ==
Two suggested origins for the name of the line have been put forward. One is that the southern part of the line ran close to the mud flats of the River Test where the winkle may be found but it is unlikely that the sprat is found there.

The second possible origin of the name may be after the seafood that was carried from Southampton to Andover.

== Topography ==
=== Gradients ===
The line generally runs on easy gradients throughout, in the valley of the River Test. There is a short fall at 1 in 62 and 1 in 81 at Andover from the junction to the Town station.

=== Locations ===
- Andover Junction; LSWR station; opened 3 July 1854; renamed Andover Junction 6 March 1865; renamed Andover 7 September 1964; still open;
- Andover Town; opened 6 March 1865; closed 7 September 1964;
- Clatford; opened 6 March 1865; closed 7 September 1964;
- Fullerton Bridge; opened 6 March 1865; closed 2 February 1885;
- Fullerton; new station ready for Hurstbourne line, opened 2 February 1885; renamed Fullerton Junction from 1889; renamed Fullerton 7 July 1929; closed 7 September 1964;
- Stockbridge; opened 6 March 1865; closed 7 September 1964;
- Horsebridge; opened 6 March 1865; closed 7 September 1964;
- Mottisfont; opened 6 March 1865; closed 7 September 1964;
- Kimbridge Junction; convergence of Salisbury line;
- Romsey; opened 1 March 1847; still open; divergence of Bishopstoke (Eastleigh) line;
- Nursling; opened 19 November 1883; closed 16 September 1957;
- Redbridge.

== See also ==
- Midland and South Western Junction Railway
- Fullerton to Hurstbourne Line
