= Lockerley =

Village and parish in Hampshire, England

Coordinates: 51°01′57″N 1°34′22″W

- Village
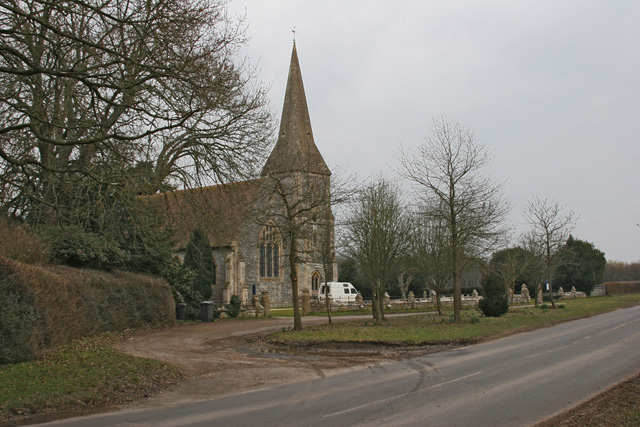
- St John's Church, Lockerley.

- Location within Hampshire
- Population: 827; 798 (2011 Census)
- OS grid reference: SU299260
- Civil parish: Lockerley
- District: Test Valley
- Shire county: Hampshire
- Region: South East
- Country: England
- Sovereign state: United Kingdom
- Post town: ROMSEY
- Postcode district: SO51
- Dialling code: 01794
- Police: Hampshire and Isle of Wight
- Fire: Hampshire and Isle of Wight
- Ambulance: South Central
- UK Parliament: Romsey
- Website: Lockerley Parish Council

Lockerley is a village and civil parish in Hampshire, England on the border with Wiltshire. The village lies on the southern bank of the River Dun about two miles upstream from its confluence with the River Test and about 4 kilometres (2.5 mi) east of West Dean which is just over the Wiltshire border. The parish has a population of around 827 people. The nearest town is Romsey, about 8 kilometres (5 mi) to the south-east and is about 13 miles from Salisbury.

The Wessex Main Line railway crosses the parish, the nearest stations being at Dunbridge and West Dean.

== Facilities ==
In Lockerley there is a village shop, a garage, and a school, Lockerley C of E Primary School. The parish church of St John the Evangelist was built in 1890. There is also a Baptist chapel.

== History ==
Lockerley Camp is an Iron Age hillfort just to the East of Lockerley.

The settlement, from the Old English lōcere lēah (a keeper's clearing), probably started as a woodland clearing from the 600s specifically for keeping pigs. By the time of the Domesday Book in 1086, the chapel at Lockerley was one of six nearby that paid customary dues to the minster at Mottisfont. The site of this Saxon chapel now lies within the churchyard of St John the Evangelist.

Lockerley Hall was built by wealthy merchant Frederick Dalgety in the 19th century and it was used to house soldiers during the First World War. In the Second World War, Lockerley was the site of a huge storehouse for the US Army prior to the Invasion of Europe, established in October 1943 and largely obsolete by October 1944 by which time supplies were being sent direct to France. The depot was just outside Dunbridge station and comprised 15 miles of sidings and 134 covered sheds.

== Notable residents ==
- Frederick Dalgety, merchant and financier
- Frederick Luke, recipient of the Victoria Cross
