= List of United Kingdom locations: East A-East D =

The United Kingdom

This is part of the list of United Kingdom locations: a gazetteer of place names in the United Kingdom showing each place's locality and geographical coordinates.

== East A ==
Location	Locality	Coordinates (links to map & photo sources)	OS grid reference
East Aberthaw	The Vale Of Glamorgan	51.38°N 03.39°W	ST0366
Eastacombe (Barnstaple)	Devon	51.04°N 04.09°W	SS5329
Eastacombe (Atherington)	Devon	50.98°N 04.02°W	SS5822
Eastacott	Devon	50.98°N 03.96°W	SS6223
East Acton	Ealing	51.50°N 00.25°W	TQ2180
East Adderbury	Oxfordshire	52.01°N 01.31°W	SP4735
East Allington	Devon	50.31°N 03.74°W	SX7648
East Anstey	Devon	51.02°N 03.62°W	SS8626
East Anton	Hampshire	51.22°N 01.47°W	SU3747
East Appleton	North Yorkshire	54.35°N 01.64°W	SE2395
East Ardsley	Leeds	53.72°N 01.54°W	SE3025
East Ashling	West Sussex	50.85°N 00.83°W	SU8207
East Aston	Hampshire	51.20°N 01.38°W	SU4345
East Ayton	North Yorkshire	54.25°N 00.48°W	SE9985

== East B ==
Location	Locality	Coordinates (links to map & photo sources)	OS grid reference
East Balmirmer	Angus	56.53°N 02.68°W	NO5838
East Bank	Blaenau Gwent	51.74°N 03.13°W	SO2206
East Barkwith	Lincolnshire	53.31°N 00.26°W	TF1681
East Barming	Kent	51.25°N 00.46°E	TQ7254
East Barnby	North Yorkshire	54.49°N 00.73°W	NZ8212
East Barnet	Barnet	51.63°N 00.16°W	TQ2794
East Barsham	Norfolk	52.86°N 00.83°E	TF9133
East Barton	Suffolk	52.25°N 00.78°E	TL9065
East Beach	West Sussex	50.73°N 00.76°W	SZ8794
East Beckham	Norfolk	52.90°N 01.21°E	TG1639
East Bedfont	Hounslow	51.44°N 00.44°W	TQ0873
East Bennan	North Ayrshire	55.44°N 05.17°W	NR9921
East Bergholt	Suffolk	51.97°N 01.01°E	TM0735
East Bierley	Kirklees	53.75°N 01.71°W	SE1929
East Bilney	Norfolk	52.73°N 00.87°E	TF9419
East Blackdene	Durham	54.73°N 02.18°W	NY8838
East Blatchington	East Sussex	50.77°N 00.09°E	TV4899
East Bloxworth	Dorset	50.74°N 02.15°W	SY8994
East Boldon	South Tyneside	54.94°N 01.43°W	NZ3661
East Boldre	Hampshire	50.79°N 01.47°W	SU3700
Eastbourne	East Sussex	50.77°N 00.25°E	TQ5900
Eastbourne	Darlington	54.52°N 01.53°W	NZ3014
East Bower	Somerset	51.12°N 02.98°W	ST3137
East Brent	Somerset	51.25°N 02.94°W	ST3451
Eastbridge	Suffolk	52.23°N 01.58°E	TM4566
East Bridgford	Nottinghamshire	52.98°N 00.97°W	SK6943
East Briscoe	Durham	54.56°N 02.04°W	NY9719
Eastbrook	Somerset	50.99°N 03.12°W	ST2122
Eastbrook	The Vale Of Glamorgan	51.43°N 03.22°W	ST1571
East Brora	Highland	58.01°N 03.86°W	NC9004
East Buckland	Devon	51.06°N 03.89°W	SS6731
East Budleigh	Devon	50.64°N 03.33°W	SY0684
Eastburn	Bradford	53.89°N 01.97°W	SE0244
Eastburn	East Riding of Yorkshire	53.98°N 00.49°W	SE9955
East Burnham	Buckinghamshire	51.53°N 00.63°W	SU9583
East Burrafirth	Shetland Islands	60.29°N 01.35°W	HU3657
East Burton	Dorset	50.67°N 02.24°W	SY8386
Eastbury	Berkshire	51.49°N 01.51°W	SU3477
Eastbury	Three Rivers	51.61°N 00.42°W	TQ0992
East Butterleigh	Devon	50.86°N 03.45°W	SS9808
East Butterwick	North Lincolnshire	53.53°N 00.74°W	SE8305
Eastby	North Yorkshire	53.98°N 01.98°W	SE0154

== East C ==
Location	Locality	Coordinates (links to map & photo sources)	OS grid reference
East Calder	West Lothian	55.88°N 03.47°W	NT0867
East Carleton	Norfolk	52.56°N 01.20°E	TG1701
East Carlton	Northamptonshire	52.49°N 00.77°W	SP8389
East Carlton	Leeds	53.88°N 01.66°W	SE2243
East Chaldon	Dorset	50.64°N 02.29°W	SY7983
East Challow	Oxfordshire	51.58°N 01.46°W	SU3788
East Charleton	Devon	50.26°N 03.74°W	SX7642
East Chelborough	Dorset	50.84°N 02.64°W	ST5505
East Chiltington	East Sussex	50.91°N 00.05°W	TQ3715
East Chinnock	Somerset	50.91°N 02.72°W	ST4913
East Chisenbury	Wiltshire	51.26°N 01.80°W	SU1452
East Cholderton	Hampshire	51.20°N 01.58°W	SU2945
Eastchurch	Kent	51.40°N 00.84°E	TQ9871
East Clandon	Surrey	51.24°N 00.49°W	TQ0551
East Claydon	Buckinghamshire	51.91°N 00.93°W	SP7325
East Clevedon	North Somerset	51.43°N 02.85°W	ST4171
East Clyne	Highland	58.03°N 03.86°W	NC9006
East Coker	Somerset	50.90°N 02.65°W	ST5412
East Combe	Somerset	51.07°N 03.20°W	ST1631
Eastcombe	Gloucestershire	51.73°N 02.16°W	SO8904
East Common	North Yorkshire	53.77°N 01.06°W	SE6231
East Compton	Somerset	51.16°N 02.55°W	ST6141
East Compton	Dorset	50.96°N 02.18°W	ST8718
East Cornworthy	Devon	50.38°N 03.63°W	SX8455
Eastcote	Hillingdon	51.58°N 00.39°W	TQ1188
Eastcote	Northamptonshire	52.17°N 01.00°W	SP6853
Eastcote	Solihull	52.40°N 01.72°W	SP1979
Eastcote Village	Hillingdon	51.58°N 00.41°W	TQ1088
Eastcott	Cornwall	50.90°N 04.49°W	SS2515
Eastcott	Wiltshire	51.29°N 01.97°W	SU0255
East Cottingwith	East Riding of Yorkshire	53.86°N 00.93°W	SE7042
Eastcotts	Bedfordshire	52.11°N 00.45°W	TL0647
Eastcourt (Burbage)	Wiltshire	51.34°N 01.67°W	SU2361
Eastcourt (Crudwell)	Wiltshire	51.62°N 02.04°W	ST9792
East Cowes	Isle of Wight	50.75°N 01.29°W	SZ5095
East Cowick	East Riding of Yorkshire	53.68°N 01.00°W	SE6621
East Cowton	North Yorkshire	54.42°N 01.53°W	NZ3003
East Cramlington	Northumberland	55.07°N 01.56°W	NZ2876
East Cranmore	Somerset	51.18°N 02.45°W	ST6843
East Creech	Dorset	50.63°N 02.11°W	SY9282
East Croachy	Highland	57.31°N 04.24°W	NH6527
East Curthwaite	Cumbria	54.82°N 03.04°W	NY3348

== East D ==
Location	Locality	Coordinates (links to map & photo sources)	OS grid reference
East Dean	East Sussex	50.76°N 00.19°E	TV5598
East Dean	Gloucestershire	51.87°N 02.50°W	SO6520
East Dean	Hampshire	51.03°N 01.61°W	SU2726
East Dean	West Sussex	50.90°N 00.72°W	SU9013
East Dene	Rotherham	53.43°N 01.33°W	SK4493
East Denside	Angus	56.53°N 02.86°W	NO4738
East Denton	Newcastle upon Tyne	54.97°N 01.68°W	NZ2065
East Dereham	Norfolk	52.66°N 00.92°E	TF9812
East Didsbury	Manchester	53.40°N 02.22°W	SJ8590
Eastdon	Devon	50.60°N 03.45°W	SX9779
East Down	Devon	51.15°N 04.00°W	SS6041
Eastdown	Devon	50.32°N 03.65°W	SX8249
East Drayton	Nottinghamshire	53.26°N 00.84°W	SK7775
East Dulwich	Southwark	51.44°N 00.07°W	TQ3474
East Dundry	North Somerset	51.39°N 02.61°W	ST5766
