= Awbridge =

Village and parish in Hampshire, England

Coordinates: 51.013396°N 1.530735°W

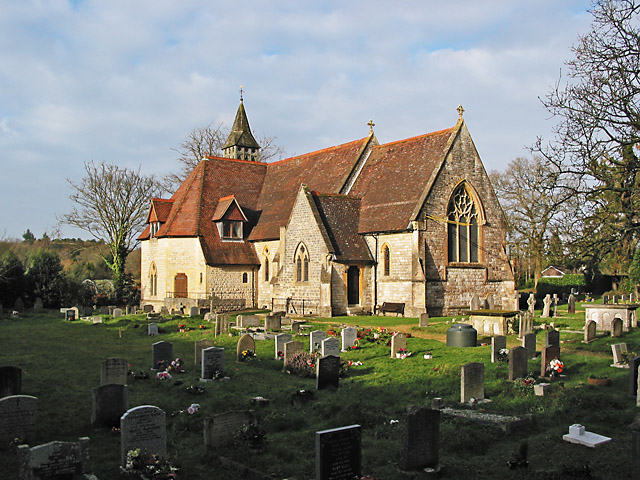
- All Saints Church, Awbridge

- Location within Hampshire
- Population: 712 (2011 Census)
- District: Test Valley
- Shire county: Hampshire
- Region: South East
- Country: England
- Sovereign state: United Kingdom
- Post town: ROMSEY
- Postcode district: SO51
- Dialling code: 01794
- Police: Hampshire and Isle of Wight
- Fire: Hampshire and Isle of Wight
- Ambulance: South Central
- UK Parliament: Romsey and Southampton North

Awbridge is a small village and civil parish in the Test Valley district of Hampshire, England, about three miles northwest of Romsey, and near the River Test. According to the 2001 census the parish, which includes the villages of Awbridge, Upper Ratley and Lower Ratley, had a population of 695, increasing to 712 at the 2011 Census.

It is within walking distance of Kimbridge, Dunbridge and Mottisfont, with Dunbridge providing a railway link to both Salisbury (to the north west) and Southampton (to the south).

== Naming ==
Commonly the references to the four hamlets are dropped, with locals referring to the entire area as Awbridge.

There is a large oak tree in the corner of the Primary School field which is commonly referred to as Kent's Oak. Due to the trees impressive size and age it is considered a local landmark. As well though there exists a fine house, now a home for the elderly named Kent's Oak which was formerly a children's home run by Hampshire County Council. Adjacent is Little Kent's Oak - another house built in later years though of similar appearance yet smaller.

Locally, the name of the village is pronounced 'A-bridge', with the letter 'w' silent.

== Attractions ==
Despite the small size of the village, there are a few notable attractions for visitors.

Millennium Circle The Millennium Circle, built by Bryan Raines from 2000 with a diameter exceeding 50 meters, sits on the intersection of two ley lines which are thought by druids to draw power between sites of geographical interest or historical monuments - in this case running between the Isle of Man and Isle of Wight as well as a ley line from nearby Stonehenge. As a conservationist, Bryan reused builder's rubble to create the stones, arranging them gradually throughout the years to create the henge with stones for key moments in the year such as the summer and winter solstice and spring equinox.

Wildlife Sanctuary Located adjacent to the aforementioned Millennium Circle, the Awbridge Wildlife Sanctuary includes a secluded woodland walking area and pond.

== Church ==
The village church is All Saints Church which was originally designed by John Colson. It was completed in 1876 with construction starting the year before. The church was extended in 1993

== Notable people ==
- May Martin, sewing teacher and judge on the The Great British Sewing Bee
