= East Grimstead =

Village in Wiltshire, England

Coordinates: 51.050°N 1.679°W

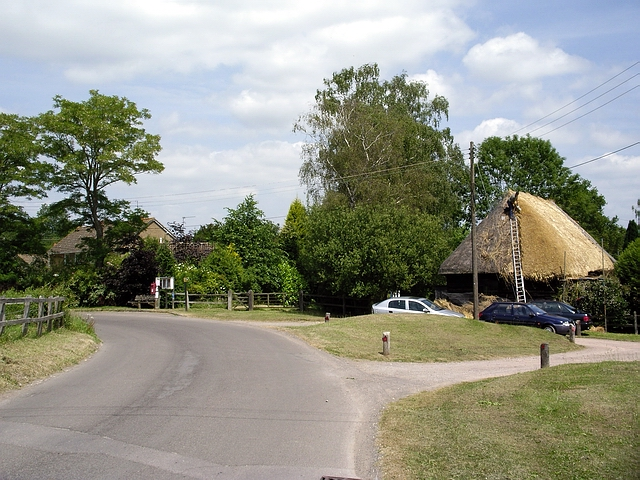
- Cottage in East Grimstead being rethatched

- Location within Wiltshire
- OS grid reference: SU226279
- Civil parish: Grimstead
- Unitary authority: Wiltshire
- Ceremonial county: Wiltshire
- Region: South West
- Country: England
- Sovereign state: United Kingdom
- Post town: Salisbury
- Postcode district: SP5
- Dialling code: 01722
- Police: Wiltshire
- Fire: Dorset and Wiltshire
- Ambulance: South Western
- UK Parliament: Salisbury
- Website: Grimstead Parish Council

East Grimstead is a village in the civil parish of Grimstead, on the River Dun in Wiltshire, England, about 5 miles (8.0 km) east of Salisbury. The village has about 70 households and no shops, public houses or schools.

== History ==
The site of a Roman villa is a short distance to the southeast of the village.

The Salisbury and Southampton Canal, opened in 1802 or 1803, passed to the south of the village on the south bank of the river; it was never completed as far as Salisbury and closed in 1806. The only surviving canal bridge carries the road south from East Grimstead, near the church.

In 1847 the London and South Western Railway opened its line between Bishopstoke in Hampshire and Milford station at Salisbury, passing East Grimshaw to the south of the canal. The line remains open as part of the Wessex Main Line from Salisbury to Southampton; the nearest station is Dean, at West Dean, about 2 miles (3.2 km) east of East Grimstead.

== Church ==
The Church of England church of the Holy Trinity was built in 1857, replacing an earlier chapel. It is subordinate to St Mary's parish church at West Dean.

== Local government ==
East Grimstead was formerly a chapelry in the parish of West Dean. In 1866 East Grimstead became a separate civil parish, then on 1 April 1934 the parish was abolished and merged with West Grimstead to form Grimstead parish. In 1931 the parish had a population of 116. It is in the area of Wiltshire Council unitary authority, which performs all significant local government functions.
