= Grimstead =

Civil parish in Wiltshire, England

Coordinates: 51.041°N 1.688°W

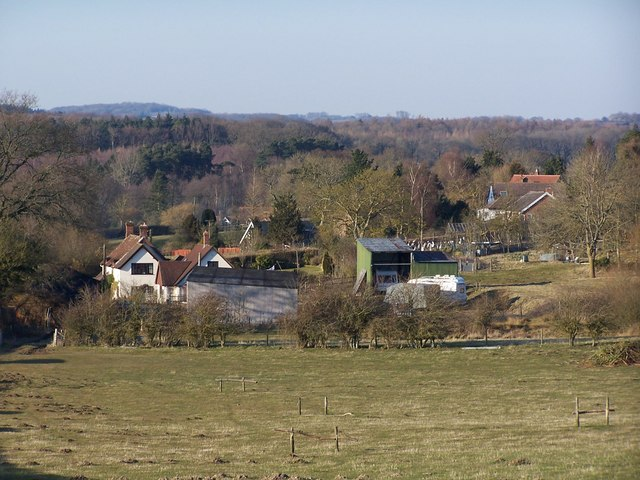
- West Grimstead

- Location within Wiltshire
- Population: 248 (in 2011)
- OS grid reference: SU220269
- Unitary authority: Wiltshire
- Ceremonial county: Wiltshire
- Region: South West
- Country: England
- Sovereign state: United Kingdom
- Post town: Salisbury
- Postcode district: SP5
- Dialling code: 01722
- Police: Wiltshire
- Fire: Dorset and Wiltshire
- Ambulance: South Western
- UK Parliament: Salisbury
- Website: grimstead-pc.gov.uk

Grimstead is a civil parish on the River Dun in Wiltshire, England, to the south-east of Salisbury. Its settlements are the villages of East Grimstead and West Grimstead. The 2011 census recorded a parish population of 534.

East Grimstead and West Grimstead each have an ecclesiastical parish with a parish church, dedicated to Holy Trinity and St John respectively. Today both are within the area of the Clarendon benefice, a group of nine rural parishes.

The first tier of local government is Grimstead Parish Council. The parish is in the area of Wiltshire Council unitary authority, which performs all significant local government functions. For parliamentary purposes, the parish falls within the Salisbury constituency.
