= Sam Fay =

British railwayman (1856–1953)

Sir Sam Fay
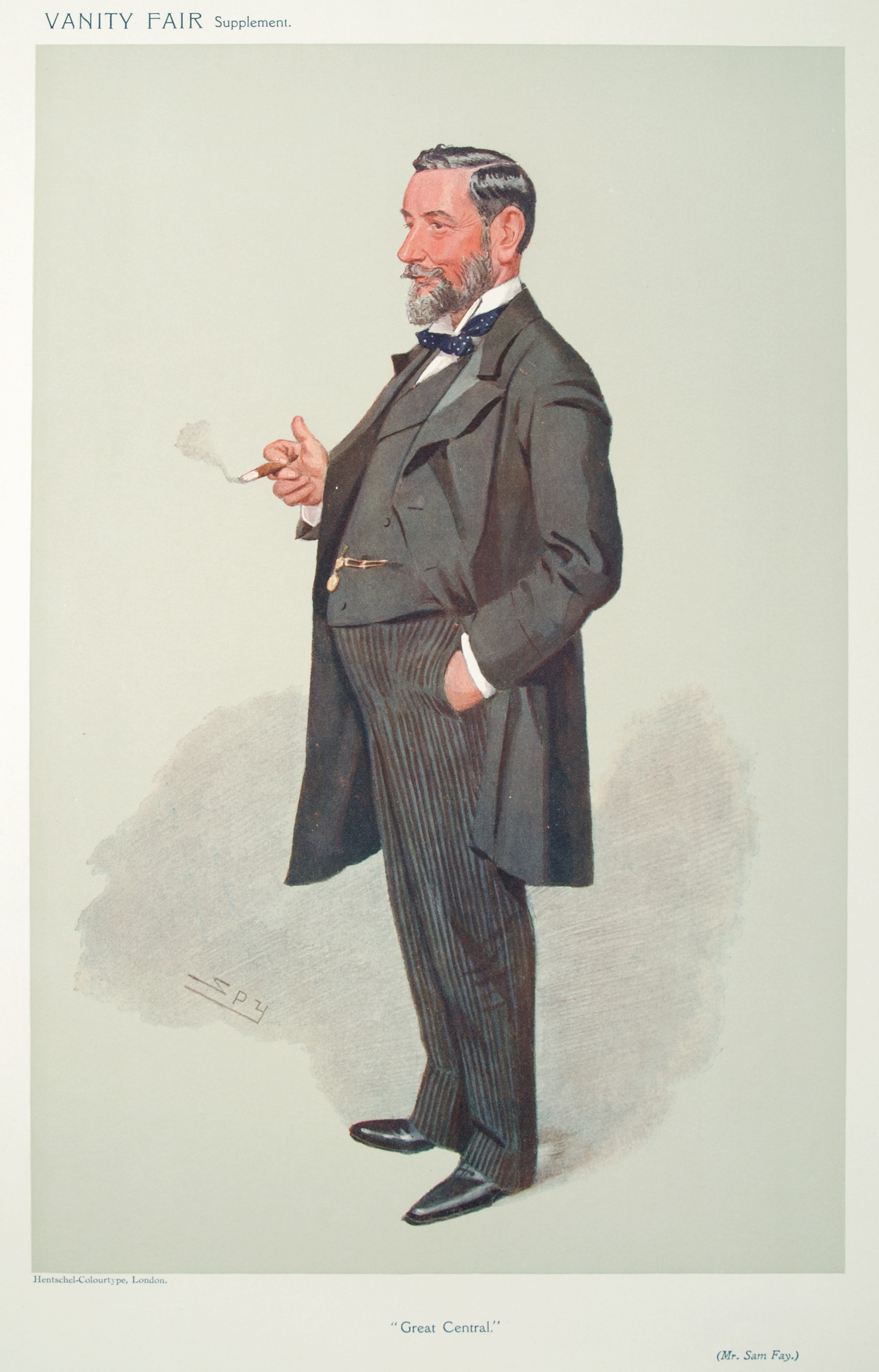
- Caricature by Spy (1907)
- Born: 30 December 1856; Hamble-le-Rice, Hampshire, England
- Died: 30 May 1953 (aged 96); Awbridge, Hampshire, England
- Resting place: All Saints, Awbridge
- Education: Blenheim House School, Fareham
- Known for: General Manager of the Great Central Railway

Sir Sam Fay TD (30 December 1856 – 30 May 1953), born in Hamble-le-Rice, Hampshire, England, was a career railwayman who joined the London and South Western Railway as a clerk in 1872 and rose to become the last General Manager of the Great Central Railway after a successful period in charge of the almost bankrupt Midland and South Western Junction Railway. He also played an important role during the First World War as part of the Railway Executive Committee.

== Early years ==
Samuel Fay was born in Hamble-le-Rice, on 30 December 1856. He was the second son of Joshua Fay (b. 1824 in Awbridge), a farmer of Huguenot origin, and Ann Philpott (b. 1820 in Eling). Fay was educated at Blenheim House school in Fareham.

== Railway career ==
=== L&SWR ===
At the age of 15½ Fay joined the London and South Western Railway. His first post was as a junior clerk at Itchen Abbas, from where he moved to Stockbridge on the Sprat and Winkle Line. After a 12-month period spent on the relief staff at various stations, Fay joined Kingston upon Thames where, in 1881, he launched the South Western Gazette together with two clerks in the general manager's office. The profits of the publication went to the L&SWR Orphanage Fund. Two years later, Fay wrote his first book, A Royal Road, which was a brief history of the L&SWR.

In 1884, Fay was transferred to Waterloo as second clerk in the Traffic Superintendent's office. After a few months he was promoted to chief clerk. He was subsequently considered for manager of the Waterford and Central Ireland Railway, but withdrew his candidature on account of the poor prospects of the job. He became Assistant Storekeeper at Nine Elms in 1891. In the same year, he was elected to Kingston Council, but this proved to be a short-lived experience.

=== M&SWJ ===
In early 1892, Fay was seconded to the Midland and South Western Junction Railway as Secretary and General Manager; at the time, the railway was in a poor condition, almost bankrupt and in the hands of a receiver. Within a period of twelve months, he had turned the situation around and restored the company to solvency, taking the place of the receiver. He also succeeded in promoting a bill for the Marlborough and Grafton Railway which completed the missing link between the two parts of the MSWJR, thereby avoiding the need to use the Great Western Railway's Berks & Hants Extension and Marlborough Railway from Savernake to Marlborough.

=== Great Central ===
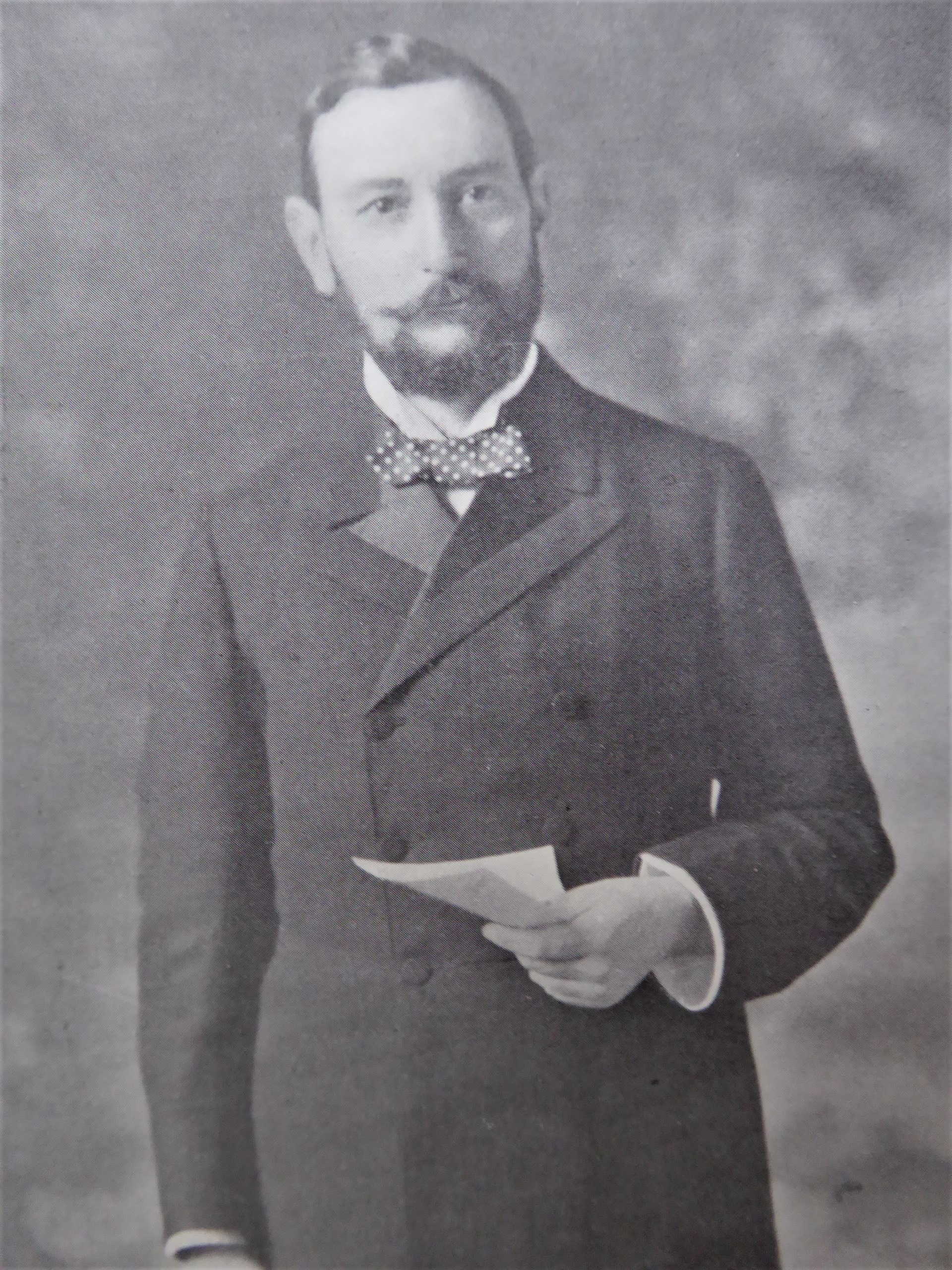
Sam Fay c.1902

In 1899, Fay returned to Waterloo as the L&SWR's Superintendent of the Line. It was from here that he was appointed by Lord Faringdon, Chairman of the Great Central Railway, to succeed Sir William Pollitt as General Manager of the line in 1902. The Great Central was at that time in a precarious financial position due to the costs of constructing its London Extension, yet Fay was confident in his ability to repeat his performance with the M&SWJ. He was to be paid £3,000 per year and his contract was subject to six months notice on either side. Presumably as a result of his experience with the M&SWJR, Fay appears to have been head-hunted to become General Manager of the Great Central Railway. Whilst he was successful in maintaining the Great Central as an effective railway, Fay was not able completely to turn round the financial position of the company.

One of his first decisions was to extend the operation of through passenger services between Newcastle and Bournemouth, supplemented by express excursions between Nottingham, Leicester and Bournemouth. Fay also reintroduced services between Sheffield and Leeds via the Swinton and Knottingley Joint Railway, as well as through services from Marylebone to Stratford-upon-Avon. Journey times for expresses between Marylebone and Sheffield were cut to 3 hours, a reduction of 8 minutes at an average speed of 54.9 mph. Fay introduced several notable innovations to the Great Central including the setting-up of a Publicity Department in 1902, and the rolling-out of the first weekly zone season tickets in Manchester in 1904. He was also responsible for the setting-up of the Great Central Railway Journal in 1905 and the initiation of competitive examinations in 1907 to create promotion opportunities for promising young members of staff.

Following his service with the War Office, Fay returned to the Great Central in May 1919. The Great Central's board of directors held their final meeting before the railway grouping on 15 December 1922. It was agreed to award Fay a pension of £3,000 per year.

=== Other railway interests ===
In 1913, Fay became part-owner of the struggling Freshwater, Yarmouth and Newport Railway. He ran the line until the railway grouping and made a profit upon its disposal to the Southern Railway.

In 1924, Fay together with Sir Vincent Raven was appointed by the Government of New South Wales to the Royal Commission on the New South Wales Government Railways. The commissioners reported in October 1924 that the metropolitan railway network was at saturation point and recommended the construction of a circular railway around Sydney, as well as the transfer of control over railway finances from the government to the Railway Commissioners. The construction of the City Circle line was subsequently commenced and a bill was passed amending the constitution of the Railway Commission.

Fay held two Argentine railway directorships – the Buenos Aires Great Southern and Buenos Aires Western Railway Companies. In 1923, he replaced Stanley Jackson on the board of directors of Beyer, Peacock and Company, constructor of numerous Great Central locomotives, of which he became Chairman on the retirement of Sir Vincent Caillard. For some time he also acted in an advisory capacity to the London and North Eastern Railway which had taken over the Great Central upon the railway grouping. Had Fay not been of retirement age at the time of the grouping, he would have been a strong contender for becoming general manager of the new company. In the event, Sir Ralph Wedgwood was appointed to the position.

== Government work ==
=== Committees ===
Fay served on two committees unconnected with railways – the Committee on Post Office wages in 1904 and the Departmental Committee on Inshore Fisheries in 1912.

=== First World War ===
Fay had, in 1911, been invited by the Secretary of State for War Richard Haldane to join the Ports and Transit Executive Committee bringing together the railway managers of six principal railway companies to examine the problem of feeding London in the event of enemy action on the south coast. Upon the outbreak of the First World War, Fay together with the eight other managers of leading railways became part of the Railway Executive Committee chaired by the LSWR's Herbert Walker.

At the beginning of 1917, Fay took over the post of Director of Movements at the War Office, an experience which he was to write about in his book The War Office at War published in 1937; he refused to wear a military uniform or to remove his beard, even though his post carried the rank of general. In March 1918, he succeeded Sir Guy Granet, the Midland's General Manager, as Director-General of Movements and Railways, with a seat on the Army Council. During the period of his absence from the Great Central, Fay's assistant, E.A. Clear, took charge of the day-to-day running of the system.

=== Grouping proposals ===
In December 1918, he had proposed to the coalition government the creation of a "Transport Authority" which would be composed of the representatives of railway and dock companies, the Board of Trade, trade unions and agricultural and industrial bodies. The Authority would acquire, using public stock, the capital of the country's railways and canals, and divide their operations into five regional groups which the Authority could take over and control in the public interest. The Prime Minister, David Lloyd George, had previously dealt with Fay in 1906, when he adopted the latter's plans for a conciliation system to settle industrial disputes on the railways. Although the power of nationalisation was withdrawn in the face of opposition in Parliament, an Act came into force on 15 August 1919 which created the Ministry of Transport headed by Sir Eric Geddes.

== Personal life ==
In 1883, Fay married Frances Ann Farbrother (b. 16 February 1858 in Kingston), with whom he had four daughters and two sons.

He had two other sons outside of the marriage, including Edgar Fay, the judge. A heavy cigar-smoker, he lived in Cirencester, Gerrards Cross and finally Awbridge Danes near Romsey in Hampshire.

In June 1902 he was gazetted a Lieutenant-Colonel in The Engineer and Railway Volunteer Staff Corps, and re-gazetted at the same rank when E&RVSC became the Engineer and Railway Staff Corps of the Royal Engineers in April 1908. He received the Territorial Decoration in October 1920, and resigned his commission in January 1924.

Fay was knighted by King George V in somewhat theatrical fashion during the royal opening of the Immingham Dock on 22 July 1912. In 1944, he published a small volume of poems and essays.

Fay died in Awbridge on 30 May 1953, seven years after his wife, who had died on 10 July 1946. He is buried in the churchyard of All Saints Church. He had intended to write his memoirs but never got beyond the stage of rough notes.

== Legacy ==
Fay had a Great Central locomotive named in honour of his 1912 knighthood, the locomotives in the class becoming known informally as "Sam Fays".

A bar/restaurant named Sam Fay's complete with railway memorabilia operated from the former Nottingham High Level station ticket office during the mid/late 1990s, although the station had always been on the Great Northern railway network until the LNER grouping in 1923.

== Bibliography ==
- Bagwell, Philip Sidney (1988). The transport revolution. London: Routledge. ISBN 978-0-415-00876-1.
- Bourne, J. M. (2001). Who's who in World War One. London: Routledge. ISBN 978-0-415-14179-6.
- Dow, George (1965). Great Central, Vol. 3: Fay sets the pace 1900–1922. London: Locomotive Publishing Co.
- Gunn, John Charles (1989). Along parallel lines: a history of the railways of New South Wales. Carlton, Vic.: Melbourne University Press. ISBN 0-522-84387-5.
- Whitehouse, P. B.; Thomas, David C. (2002). LNER 150: the London and North Eastern Railway: a century and a half of progress. Newton Abbot: David Charles. ISBN 978-0-7153-1381-7.
