= Smannell =

Village and parish in Hampshire, England

Coordinates: 51.238800°N 1.45661°W

- Civil parish
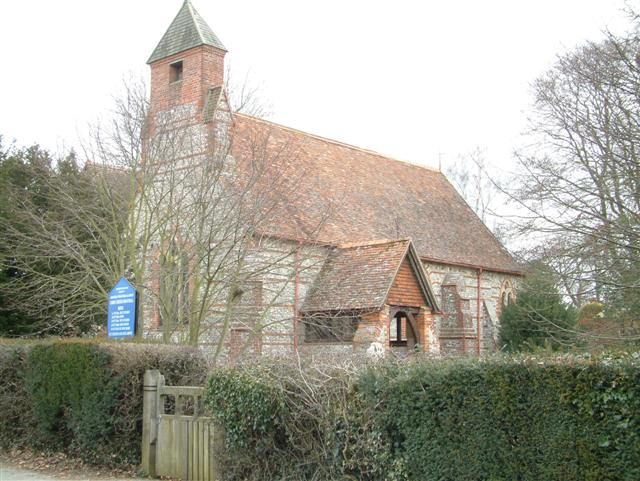
- Smannell Church

- Location within Hampshire
- Interactive map showing the parish boundary
- Population: 286 (2021 census)
- OS grid reference: SU3803148987
- District: Test Valley
- Shire county: Hampshire
- Region: South East
- Country: England
- Sovereign state: United Kingdom
- Post town: Andover
- Postcode district: SP11
- Dialling code: 01264
- Police: Hampshire and Isle of Wight
- Fire: Hampshire and Isle of Wight
- Ambulance: South Central
- UK Parliament: North West Hampshire

Smannell is a village and civil parish in Hampshire, England, located two miles north-east of Andover.

There is a mixture of housing types including brick and flint, thatched cottages, and more modern 20th-century housing.

The village has a Church of England church – Christ Church.

== Governance ==
Formerly part of Andover parish, Smannell civil parish was created in 1933. It has an elected parish council of 7 members.

At the lower tier of local government, Smannel is in the Test Valley district. For elections to the district council, Smannell parish is divided between the wards of Bourne Valley and Andover Romans. The area in Bourne Valley is referred to as the Parish Ward of Smannell, whilst the area in Andover Romans is referred to as Augusta Park.

Historically, Smannell was in Andover rural district from the creation of the parish in 1933 until local government reorganisation in 1974.

== Demographics ==
During the 2000s and 2010s, the population of Smannel parish grew as the East Anton suburban housing development progressed on land in the parish adjacent to Andover. In 2018, East Anton was transferred to Andover civil parish, resulting in a drop in the parish population at the following census.

Census population of Smannell parish
Census	Population	Female	Male	Households	Source
2001	323	161	162	125	
2011	1,318	654	664	511	
2021	286	146	140	126	

== The Oak pub ==
The Oak (originally called The British Oak) dates from the mid 19th century, and in 1990 was sold to Wadworth Brewery, refurbished in 2003 and renamed. It is built using brick and flint (similar to the surrounding houses).
