= Bossington =

Bossington may refer to:

- Bossington, Hampshire
- Bossington, Kent
- Bossington, Somerset
