= West Grimstead =

Village in Wiltshire, England

Coordinates: 51.039°N 1.701°W

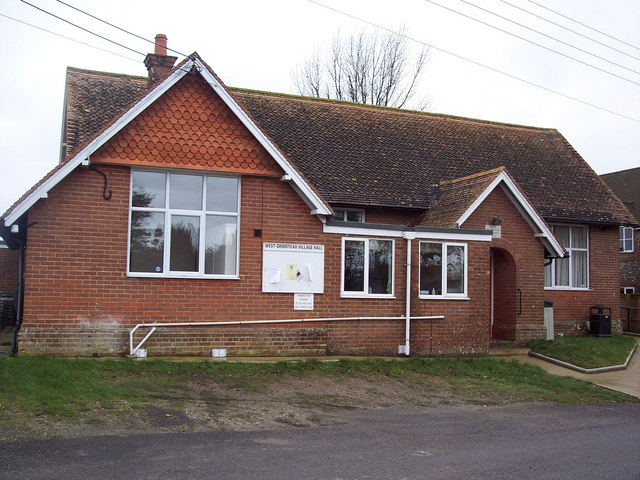
- West Grimstead Village Hall

- Location within Wiltshire
- OS grid reference: SU211267
- Civil parish: Grimstead
- Unitary authority: Wiltshire
- Ceremonial county: Wiltshire
- Region: South West
- Country: England
- Sovereign state: United Kingdom
- Post town: Salisbury
- Postcode district: SP5
- Dialling code: 01722
- Police: Wiltshire
- Fire: Dorset and Wiltshire
- Ambulance: South Western
- UK Parliament: Salisbury
- Website: Grimstead Parish Council

West Grimstead is a village in the civil parish of Grimstead, on the River Dun in Wiltshire, England, about 4.5 miles (7.2 km) southeast of Salisbury.

== History ==
Until the early 20th century, much of West Grimstead was owned by landed gentry and was part of larger estates. There are early references to the De Grimstede family, the village passing from them through the male line first to the Perots, then to the Berkeleys; next through the female line to the Breretons; again by the male line to Sir William Compton of Compton Wynyates. West Grimstead was then sold by Richard Compton to Sir Stephen Fox, later Earl of Ilchester. West Grimstead remained part of the Ilchester estate through the 18th century until it was sold to the 2nd Earl of Radnor in 1801 at the time of the parish's inclosure act. In 1916, the whole village was sold by the Longford Estate, mainly to sitting tenants. In 1931, the civil parish had a population of 218.

The Salisbury and Southampton Canal was built close to the north of the village. In 1803, the section eastward from West Grimstead was opened, linking to the Andover Canal near Kimbridge; the canal was never completed as far as Salisbury and closed in 1806.

In 1847, the London and South Western Railway opened its line between Bishopstoke in Hampshire and Milford station at Salisbury, following the route of the canal but in a straighter line. The railway remains open as part of the Wessex Main Line from Salisbury to Southampton.

== Religious sites ==
Parts of the Church of England parish church of Saint John date from about 1300, but the brick tower is from the early 18th century. A stained glass window by Heaton, Butler and Bayne was installed in 1900 and in 1960 the church was designated as Grade II* listed. The benefice was united with Alderbury in 1971, and today the parish is within the area of the Clarendon group, alongside Alderbury, East Grimstead and seven others.

A Wesleyan Methodist chapel was built in the village in 1825 and gained more worshippers than the church. A larger chapel was built on the same site in 1869 and a schoolroom was added in 1885. The chapel closed in 2009 and was converted for residential use.

== Local government ==
On 1 April 1934, the parish was merged with East Grimstead to form "Grimstead". It is in the area of Wiltshire Council unitary authority, which performs all significant local government functions.

== Amenities ==
There is a village hall, built in 1913. The village shop and public house closed some years ago. The village school closed in 1993, replaced by a new school built in Alderbury for the children of both Alderbury and West Grimstead.
