= Lockerley Camp =

Iron Age hillfort in Hampshire, England

- Location within Hampshire
- 51.0317°N 1.5675°W
- Periods: Iron Age
- Location: Hampshire

Site notes
- Area: 5 acres (2.0 ha)
- Public access: on private farmland

Lockerley Camp is the site of an Iron Age univallate hillfort located in Hampshire. Situated on a low gravel-capped plateau, it covers approximately 5 acres and is now much reduced by ploughing, for the majority of the site falls into farmland, although a small area to the north is within a small coppice and the earthworks are more discernible here.

== Location ==
The site is located at grid reference SU304259, and lies to the east of the village of Lockerley, in the county of Hampshire. Immediately to the north lies the River Dun. The site lies at a level of approximately 40m AOD.
