= Andover Guildhall =

Municipal building in Andover, Hampshire, England

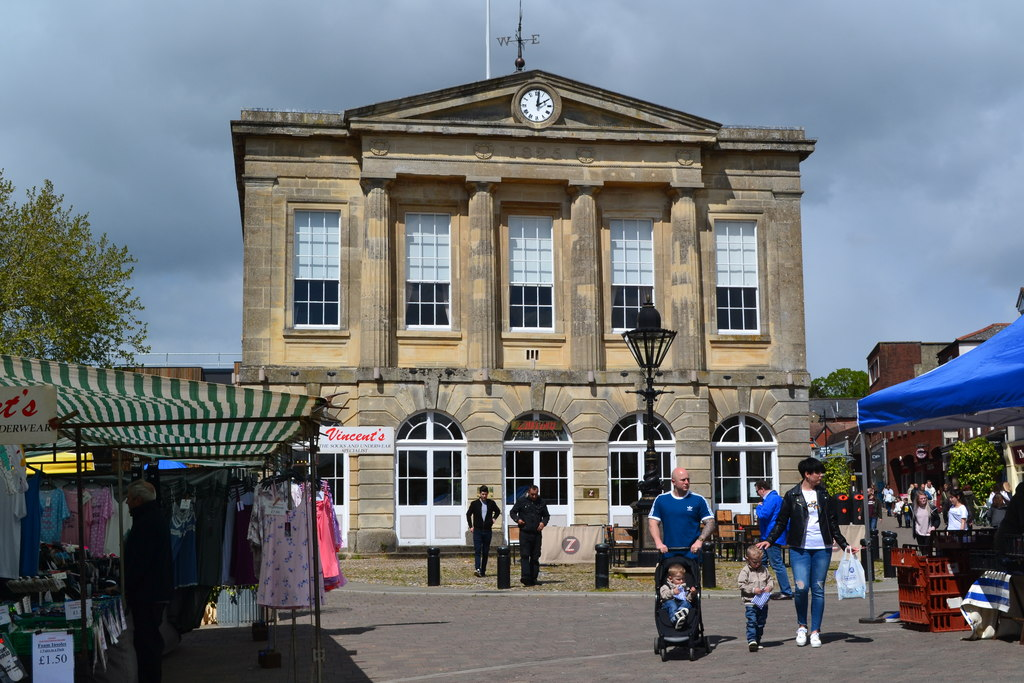
- Andover Guildhall

- Shown in Hampshire
- 51.2078°N 1.4793°W
- Location: High Street, Andover

History
- Built: 1825

Site notes
- Architectural style: Neoclassical style

Listed Building – Grade II*
- Official name: Guildhall
- Designated: 24 February 1950
- Reference no.: 1236337

Andover Guildhall is a municipal building in the High Street, Andover, Hampshire, England. The guildhall, which was the headquarters of Andover Borough Council, is a Grade II* listed building.

== History ==
The first guildhall in Andover was built in around 1513 and remodelled in 1574. A new guildhall was erected in 1724, brick-built with a tiled roof, topped by a wooden cupola containing a clock and the market bell.

By the early 19th century it had become dilapidated and civic leaders decided to erect a more substantial structure on the same site. The new building was designed in the neoclassical style by John Harris Langdon, built in ashlar stone and was completed in 1825. The design involved a symmetrical main frontage with five bays facing south down the High Street; the central section of three bays, which slightly projected forward and was rusticated, featured three round headed openings on the ground floor and three sash windows on the first floor flanked by Doric order columns supporting an entablature, a frieze and a large pediment. The frieze featured circular decorations above the columns and also recorded the date of completion. At roof level, there was originally a central clock tower (containing a clock by George Yonge of the Strand); but this was removed due to structural problems in 1904 (the clock was reinstalled in the centre of the pediment).

In November 1830, during the Swing Riots, a group of 300 protesting agricultural labourers set off from the Angel Inn in Andover for Taskers Foundry at Upper Clatford where they destroyed much of the machinery: the foundry must have recovered because the floor in the guildhall was strengthened with iron columns from the foundry in 1834. The town hall was again at the centre of a riot in 1914, when magistrates imprisoned a teenager, Phyllis Beckenham, and her mother for non-payment of fines after, against the wishes of the court, she had accosted a shopkeeper, the supposed father of her child: a group of some 2,000 protestors, who supported the teenager, ransacked many of the shops in the High Street.

During the First World War, recruitment rallies took place outside the town hall to attract potential soldiers for Kitchener's Army. A war memorial, designed by Captain Herbert Cowley to commemorate the lives of local service personnel who had died in the First World War, was unveiled in front of the guildhall by the Lord Lieutenant of Hampshire, Major General J. E. B. Seely, on 5 May 1920. In preparation for an expansion scheme, which did not ultimately proceed, the war memorial was relocated to St Mary's Churchyard in 1956.

The guildhall continued to serve as the headquarters of Andover Borough Council for much of the 20th century. In 1947 Andover Borough Council bought a large house called Beech Park on Weyhill Road to serve as its main offices, but continued to hold its meetings at the guildhall. In 1974 Andover Borough Council merged with other nearby authorities to become Test Valley District Council (renamed Test Valley Borough Council in 1976). Test Valley Borough Council has its main offices in a modern building at Beech Park, built in 1990 on the site of the old house. However, full council meetings are not held at Beech Park, but alternately at Andover Guildhall and in Romsey, the other main town in Test Valley. Andover Guildhall is also used for some meetings of Andover Town Council.

A petition was launched in around 2014 to move the war memorial back in front of the guildhall where it would be more visible but, after several debates over the issue, the council announced that it had no plans to return the memorial to its original position. The ground floor of the town hall was converted for use as a restaurant in 2010 but the main assembly hall on the first floor, known as the Upper Guildhall, remains available for community use.
