= Frederick Dalgety =

Frederick Gonnerman Dalgety (Canada, 3 December 1817–London, 20 March 1894) was a merchant and financier, the founder of Dalgety plc, one of the United Kingdom's largest conglomerates. He was born in Canada to Alexander Dalgety, army officer, and his wife Elizabeth, née Doidge.

== Career ==
Dalgety arrived at Sydney in Australia on 2 June 1834 (at the age of 16) in the Dryade and was an apprentice clerk in a local merchandising business, T. C. Breillat & Co, a business that was just being set up by Thomas Chaplin Breillat.

In December 1842 he moved to Melbourne, which had only recently been established, and became manager of a new wool trading firm. Between 1851 and 1855 he made about £150,000 from his gold speculations alone. At this time he lived at Como House in Melbourne which he bought in 1852, but sold it within a year.

In 1859, he returned to live permanently in England at Lockerley Hall in Hampshire and was appointed High Sheriff of Hampshire for 1877.

In 1884, with advancing age, the increasing demand for capital and competition from joint-stock companies and banks, Dalgety incorporated his private partnerships as a joint-stock company, called Dalgety & Co, which was listed on the London Stock Exchange. By that time it had operations in London, Melbourne, Geelong, Launceston, Dunedin, Christchurch and Sydney.

== Family ==
In December 1855 he married Blanche Trosse Allen and together they had five sons and five daughters, none of whom went into the business. She died on 11 April 1883. Dalgety died in Hampshire on 20 March 1894.
