= Listed buildings in Mottisfont =

Historic structures in Hampshire, England

Mottisfont is a village and civil parish in Hampshire, England. It contains 59 listed buildings that are recorded in the National Heritage List for England. Of these two are grade I, one is grade II* and 56 are grade II.

This list is based on the information retrieved online from Historic England.

== Key ==
| Grade | Criteria |
|---|---|
| I | Buildings that are of exceptional interest |
| II* | Particularly important buildings of more than special interest |
| II | Buildings that are of special interest |

== Listing ==
| Name | Grade | Location | Type | Completed (Note: The date given is the date used by Historic England as significant for the initial building or that of an important part in the structure's description.) | Date designated | Grid ref. (Note: The grid reference is based on the British national grid reference system, sometimes known as OSGB36, used by the Ordnance Survey.) Geo-coordinates | Notes | Entry number (Note: The "List Entry Number" is a unique number assigned to each listed building and scheduled monument by Historic England.) | Image | Wikidata |
|---|---|---|---|---|---|---|---|---|---|---|
| Glebe Farmhouse | II | | | | 11 April 1986 | SU3253026802; 51°02′23″N 1°32′15″W | | 1093728 | Upload Photo | Q26386061 |
| Hazel Cottage | II | | | | 11 April 1986 | SU3254926813; 51°02′23″N 1°32′14″W | | 1172704 | Upload Photo | Q26467480 |
| Lower Lodge | II | | | | 11 April 1986 | SU3283326765; 51°02′22″N 1°31′59″W | | 1172705 | Upload Photo | Q26467481 |
| Meadow Cottage | II | | | | 11 April 1986 | SU3119226077; 51°02′00″N 1°33′24″W | | 1168012 | Upload Photo | Q26461427 |
| Mount Farmhouse | II | | | | 11 April 1986 | SU3108725155; 51°01′30″N 1°33′29″W | | 1093719 | Upload Photo | Q26386051 |
| Oakley Farmhouse | II | | | | 11 April 1986 | SU3309527669; 51°02′51″N 1°31′45″W | | 1093720 | Upload Photo | Q26386052 |
| The Old Fox | II | | | | 29 May 1957 | SU3244226802; 51°02′23″N 1°32′19″W | | 1172697 | Upload Photo | Q26467473 |
| The Smithy | II | | | | 11 April 1986 | SU3245026780; 51°02′22″N 1°32′19″W | | 1339146 | Upload Photo | Q26623418 |
| Poorhouses | II | 2-4, B3084 | | | 11 April 1986 | SU3188426429; 51°02′11″N 1°32′48″W | | 1168079 | Upload Photo | Q26461490 |
| Barn Immediately North of Spearywell Farmhouse | II | B3084 | | | 11 April 1986 | SU3165627831; 51°02′56″N 1°32′59″W | | 1168053 | Upload Photo | Q26461462 |
| Hatt Farmhouse | II | B3084 | | | 11 April 1986 | SU3180826606; 51°02′17″N 1°32′52″W | | 1296605 | Upload Photo | Q26584244 |
| Newlyns Farmhouse | II | B3084 | | | 11 April 1986 | SU3167428269; 51°03′10″N 1°32′58″W | | 1093721 | Upload Photo | Q26386053 |
| Pugs Bunny | II | B3084 | | | 11 April 1986 | SU3166027994; 51°03′02″N 1°32′59″W | | 1296596 | Upload Photo | Q26584234 |
| Spearywell Cottage | II | B3084 | | | 11 April 1986 | SU3160727814; 51°02′56″N 1°33′02″W | | 1093723 | Upload Photo | Q26386055 |
| Spearywell Farmhouse | II | B3084 | | | 11 April 1986 | SU3165427811; 51°02′56″N 1°32′59″W | | 1093722 | Upload Photo | Q26386054 |
| Thatched Cottage | II | B3084 | | | 11 April 1986 | SU3160427385; 51°02′42″N 1°33′02″W | | 1093724 | Upload Photo | Q26386056 |
| Trokes Cottage | II | B3084 | | | 11 April 1986 | SU3185126580; 51°02′16″N 1°32′50″W | | 1339144 | Upload Photo | Q26623416 |
| Wych Elm | II | B3084 | | | 11 April 1986 | SU3158327381; 51°02′42″N 1°33′03″W | | 1168061 | Upload Photo | Q26461473 |
| Barn 20 Metres Southeast of Little Bentley Farmhouse | II | Bentley | | | 11 April 1986 | SU3093429494; 51°03′50″N 1°33′36″W | | 1168089 | Upload Photo | Q26461500 |
| Barn 50 Metres East of Little Bentley Farmhouse | II | Bentley | | | 11 April 1986 | SU3096029502; 51°03′50″N 1°33′34″W | | 1339145 | Upload Photo | Q26623417 |
| Great Bentley Farmhouse | II | Bentley | | | 11 April 1986 | SU3142829489; 51°03′50″N 1°33′10″W | | 1172676 | Upload Photo | Q26467454 |
| Little Bentley Farmhouse | II | Bentley | | | 11 April 1986 | SU3090229520; 51°03′51″N 1°33′37″W | | 1093725 | Upload Photo | Q26386058 |
| Tithe Barn, Beside Glebe Farmhouse | II | Beside Glebe Farmhouse | | | 11 April 1986 | SU3250826802; 51°02′23″N 1°32′16″W | | 1172702 | Upload Photo | Q26467478 |
| Icehouse in Copse 280 Metres South of St Andrew's Church, Beside Lane | II | Beside Lane, Rectory Lane | | | 11 April 1986 | SU3259026470; 51°02′12″N 1°32′12″W | | 1339172 | Upload Photo | Q26623443 |
| Old Cottages | II | Dunbridge | | | 11 April 1986 | SU3145425888; 51°01′53″N 1°33′10″W | | 1093726 | Upload Photo | Q26386059 |
| The White House | II | Hatt Lane | | | 11 April 1986 | SU3243126721; 51°02′20″N 1°32′20″W | | 1093727 | Upload Photo | Q26386060 |
| 2 Urns Immediately East of East End of Mottisfont Abbey | II | Mottisfont Abbey | | | 11 April 1986 | SU3273126961; 51°02′28″N 1°32′04″W | | 1339150 | Upload Photo | Q26623422 |
| 3 Istrian Seats Beside Wall Running West from Mottisfont Abbey | II | Mottisfont Abbey | | | 11 April 1986 | SU3266326958; 51°02′28″N 1°32′08″W | | 1172801 | Upload Photo | Q26467570 |
| 4 Thermae Against Hedge 110 Metres to East North East of North East Corner of Mottisfont Abbey | II | Mottisfont Abbey | | | 11 April 1986 | SU3279727048; 51°02′31″N 1°32′01″W | | 1093733 | 4 Thermae Against Hedge 110 Metres to East North East of North East Corner of Mottisfont Abbey More images | Q26386064 |
| Cascade on Spring 100 Metres South West of South West Wing of Mottisfont Abbey | II | Mottisfont Abbey | | | 11 April 1986 | SU3264626862; 51°02′25″N 1°32′09″W | | 1093734 | Upload Photo | Q26386065 |
| Finial on Plinth in Sunken Yew Enclosure Beside North West Corner of Mottisfont Abbey | II | Mottisfont Abbey | | | 11 April 1986 | SU3267626975; 51°02′28″N 1°32′07″W | | 1296526 | Upload Photo | Q26584173 |
| Icehouse 100 Metres North West of Mottisfont Abbey | II | Mottisfont Abbey | | | 11 April 1986 | SU3258827041; 51°02′30″N 1°32′12″W | | 1172753 | Upload Photo | Q26467527 |
| Mottisfont Abbey House | I | Mottisfont Abbey | English country house | | 29 May 1957 | SU3270426965; 51°02′28″N 1°32′06″W | | 1093730 | Mottisfont Abbey House More images | Q2731378 |
| Remains of Chapter House Immediately South of South East Wing of Mottisfont Abbey | II | Mottisfont Abbey | | | 11 April 1986 | SU3272126942; 51°02′27″N 1°32′05″W | | 1296502 | Remains of Chapter House Immediately South of South East Wing of Mottisfont Abbey More images | Q26584150 |
| Retaining Wall to North Walk Running from North West Corner of Mottisfont Abbey | II | Mottisfont Abbey | | | 11 April 1986 | SU3267627006; 51°02′29″N 1°32′07″W | | 1093731 | Upload Photo | Q26386062 |
| Spring Source 90 Metres South West of South West Wing of Mottisfont Abbey | II | Mottisfont Abbey | | | 11 April 1986 | SU3265326879; 51°02′25″N 1°32′08″W | | 1093693 | Upload Photo | Q26386028 |
| Stable Block | II* | Mottisfont Abbey | stable | | 29 May 1957 | SU3263027017; 51°02′30″N 1°32′09″W | | 1093729 | Stable Block More images | Q17535548 |
| Statue 70 Metres North of North East Corner of Mottisfont Abbey | II | Mottisfont Abbey | | | 11 April 1986 | SU3273327049; 51°02′31″N 1°32′04″W | | 1296533 | Statue 70 Metres North of North East Corner of Mottisfont Abbey More images | Q26584179 |
| Statue at End of West Walk West of Mottisfont Abbey | II | Mottisfont Abbey | | | 11 April 1986 | SU3264826958; 51°02′28″N 1°32′09″W | | 1339148 | Statue at End of West Walk West of Mottisfont Abbey More images | Q26623420 |
| Summerhouse 100 Metres North East of Mottisfont Abbey | II | Mottisfont Abbey | | | 11 April 1986 | SU3277027052; 51°02′31″N 1°32′02″W | | 1172844 | Summerhouse 100 Metres North East of Mottisfont Abbey More images | Q26467610 |
| Terrace Wall 70 Metres North of Mottisfont Abbey | II | Mottisfont Abbey | | | 11 April 1986 | SU3271127033; 51°02′30″N 1°32′05″W | | 1172823 | Terrace Wall 70 Metres North of Mottisfont Abbey More images | Q26467590 |
| Urn on Plinth 110 Metres North North East of Mottisfont Abbey | II | Mottisfont Abbey | | | 11 April 1986 | SU3275427066; 51°02′31″N 1°32′03″W | | 1093732 | Upload Photo | Q26386063 |
| Urn on Plinth 140 Metres South South East of South West Wing of Mottisfont Abbey | II | Mottisfont Abbey | | | 11 April 1986 | SU3266026829; 51°02′24″N 1°32′08″W | | 1093694 | Upload Photo | Q26386029 |
| Urn on Plinth 150 Metres South of South West Wing of Mottisfont Abbey | II | Mottisfont Abbey | | | 11 April 1986 | SU3268826809; 51°02′23″N 1°32′07″W | | 1339169 | Upload Photo | Q26623440 |
| Wall Bounding Lawn Running from North East of Mottisfont Abbey | II | Mottisfont Abbey | | | 11 April 1986 | SU3272427007; 51°02′29″N 1°32′05″W | | 1339149 | Upload Photo | Q26623421 |
| Walled Gardens 250 Metres North West of Mottisfont Abbey | II | Mottisfont Abbey | | | 11 April 1986 | SU3247327047; 51°02′31″N 1°32′17″W | | 1339147 | Walled Gardens 250 Metres North West of Mottisfont Abbey More images | Q26623419 |
| Abbey Farm Cottages | II | Oakley Road | | | 11 April 1986 | SU3243126908; 51°02′26″N 1°32′20″W | | 1339170 | Upload Photo | Q26623441 |
| Barn 20 Metres South West of Dairy Cottage | II | Oakley Road | | | 11 April 1986 | SU3238226886; 51°02′26″N 1°32′22″W | | 1093697 | Upload Photo | Q26386032 |
| Dairy Cottage | II | Oakley Road | | | 11 April 1986 | SU3240026905; 51°02′26″N 1°32′21″W | | 1093696 | Upload Photo | Q26386031 |
| Granary 10 Metres West of Dairy Cottage | II | Oakley Road | | | 11 April 1986 | SU3238326910; 51°02′26″N 1°32′22″W | | 1339171 | Upload Photo | Q26623442 |
| Stable Range 10 Metres South of Abbey Farm Cottages | II | Oakley Road | | | 11 April 1986 | SU3242926876; 51°02′25″N 1°32′20″W | | 1093698 | Upload Photo | Q26386033 |
| Top Lodge and Gates | II | Oakley Road | | | 29 May 1957 | SU3242626967; 51°02′28″N 1°32′20″W | | 1093695 | Top Lodge and Gates More images | Q26386030 |
| Dengrid | II | 1, Rectory Lane | | | 11 April 1986 | SU3255926745; 51°02′21″N 1°32′13″W | | 1093702 | Upload Photo | Q26386037 |
| 2, Rectory Lane | II | 2, Rectory Lane | | | 11 April 1986 | SU3255826728; 51°02′20″N 1°32′13″W | | 1296459 | Upload Photo | Q26584113 |
| Church of St Andrew | I | Rectory Lane | church building | | 29 May 1957 | SU3259426749; 51°02′21″N 1°32′11″W | | 1172913 | Church of St Andrew More images | Q17528547 |
| Group of 4 Late C17 Headstones Immediately South of East Nave | II | Rectory Lane | | | 11 April 1986 | SU3259326744; 51°02′21″N 1°32′11″W | | 1093701 | Upload Photo | Q26386036 |
| Group of 6 Late C17 and C18 Headstones Immediately South of West Nave | II | Rectory Lane | | | 11 April 1986 | SU3258426744; 51°02′21″N 1°32′12″W | | 1172920 | Upload Photo | Q26467681 |
| Mottisfont House and the Little House | II | Rectory Lane | | | 29 May 1957 | SU3262326769; 51°02′22″N 1°32′10″W | | 1093699 | Upload Photo | Q26386034 |
| Wall Around Mottisfont House on Roadside and Stable Block | II | Rectory Lane | | | 11 April 1986 | SU3264726786; 51°02′22″N 1°32′09″W | | 1093700 | Upload Photo | Q26386035 |

== See also ==
- Grade I listed buildings in Hampshire
- Grade II* listed buildings in Hampshire

== Sources ==
- Bullen, Michael; Hubbuck, Rodney; Crook, John; Pevsner, Nikolaus (2010), Hampshire: Winchester and the North, The Buildings of England, New Haven and London: Yale University Press, ISBN 978-0-300-12084-4
