= Borbach Chantry =

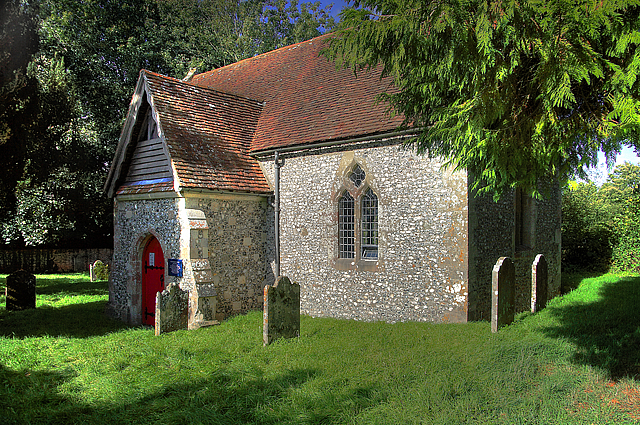

- Location within Wiltshire
- 51°02′45″N 1°38′11″W
- Location: West Dean, Wiltshire, England

History
- Built: 1333

Listed Building – Grade I
- Official name: Borbach Chantry
- Designated: 23 March 1960
- Reference no.: 1184418

Borbach Chantry, West Dean, in south-east Wiltshire, England, was built in 1333. It is recorded in the National Heritage List for England as a Grade I listed building, and is now a redundant church in the care of the Churches Conservation Trust. It was declared redundant on 5 October 1971, and was vested in the trust (at that time the Redundant Churches Fund) on 19 January 1973.

The chapel was built of flint with limestone dressings, about 1333 by Robert de Borbach in the south aisle of a 14th-century parish church, but is all that remains of the church. When the rest was demolished in 1868 the arcade which connected the chapel to the church was walled up, with a central window taken from the demolished chancel, and a south porch was added. The 14th-century trussed rafters of the roof were retained.

The work was carried out by the Evelyn family in order to preserve their monuments. At the east end, behind 17th-century iron railings, is a full-height monument to Robert Pierrepoint (died 1669), whose family married into the Evelyns. Julian Orbach calls the black, white and gold monument "intensely dramatic" and states that it is attributed to John Bushnell.

Monuments on the north wall include the kneeling figures of John Evelyn (died 1627) and his wife, under a Baroque double pediment, their eleven children kneeling below them. The parliamentarian John Evelyn (died 1685) has a bust in a black niche, under a pediment bearing an urn and two female figures, described as "good" by Orbach.

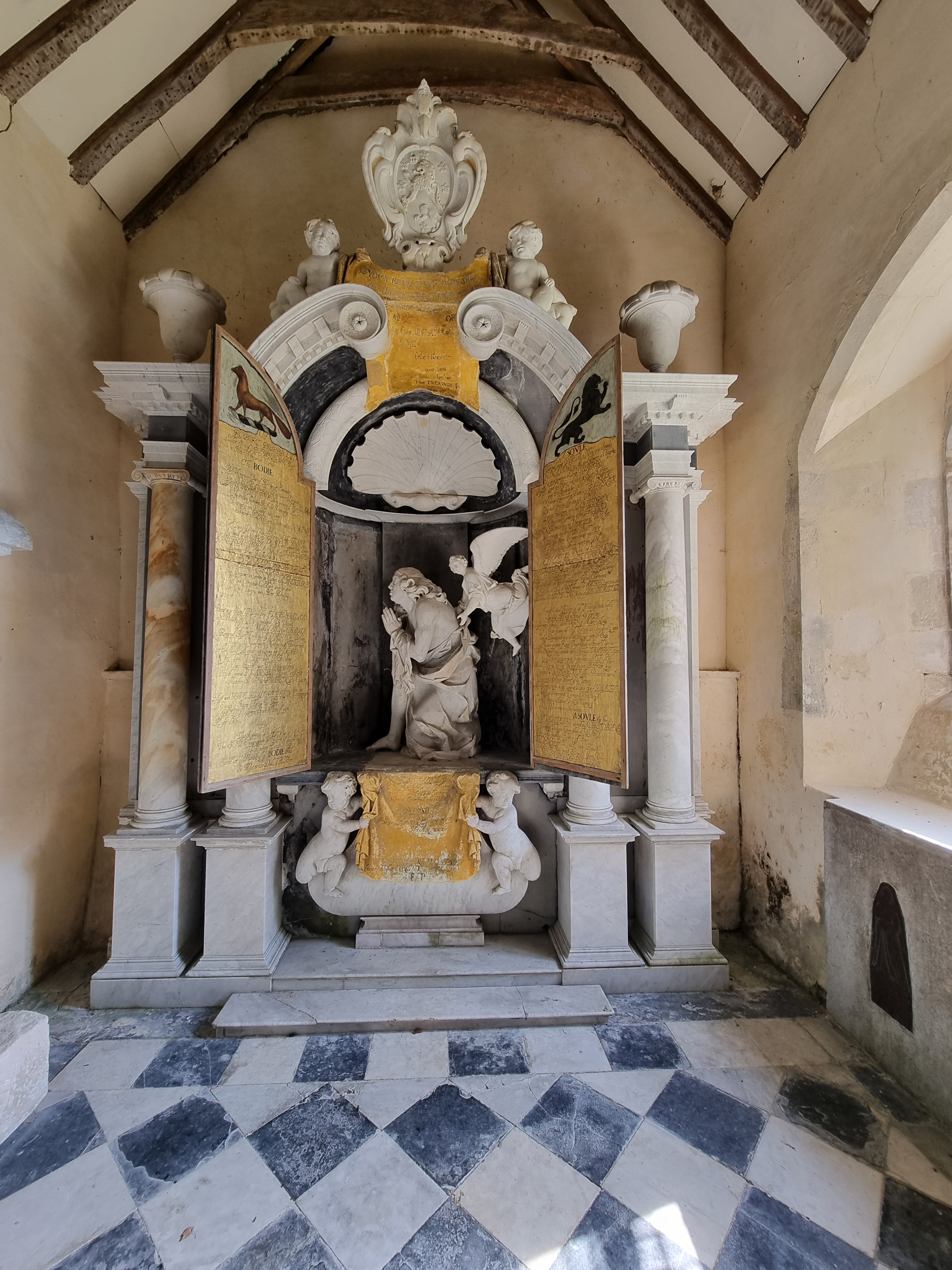
Pierrepoint memorial

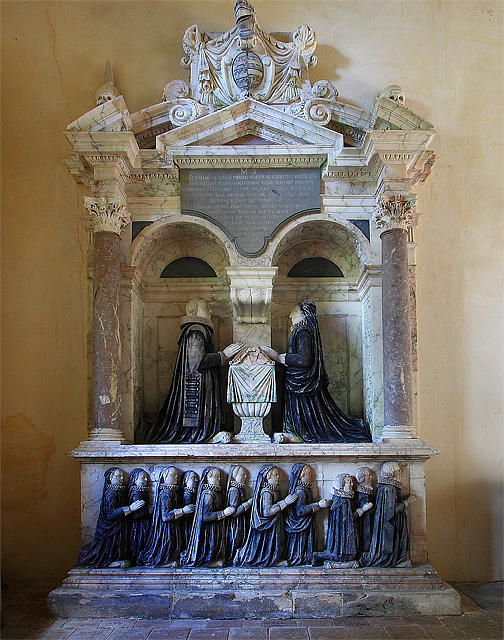
John Evelyn (d.1627), his wife and eleven children

== See also ==
- List of churches preserved by the Churches Conservation Trust in Southwest England
