= Frenchmoor =

Hamlet and civil parish in Hampshire, England

Coordinates: 51.050835°N 1.6101847°W

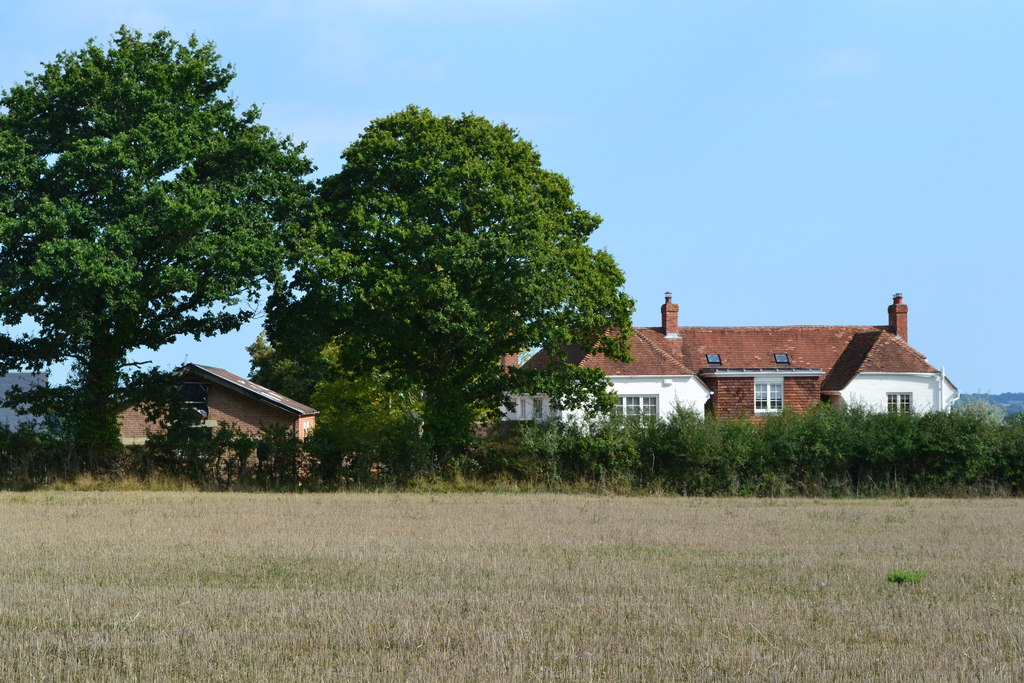
- Frenchmoor Farm

- Location within Hampshire
- Population: 25
- OS grid reference: SU274280
  - London: 70 miles (110 km) ENE
- District: Test Valley
- Shire county: Hampshire
- Region: South East
- Country: England
- Sovereign state: United Kingdom
- Post town: Salisbury
- Postcode district: SP5
- Police: Hampshire and Isle of Wight
- Fire: Hampshire and Isle of Wight
- Ambulance: South Central
- UK Parliament: Romsey and Southampton North

Frenchmoor is a hamlet and civil parish in the Test Valley district of Hampshire, England, close to the border with Wiltshire. According to the 2001 census it had a population of 25. The parish is about 10 miles (16 km) north-west of Romsey. Frenchmoor is roughly equisidiant between the larger settlements of East Tytherley and West Tytherley.
