= Dunbridge =

Hamlet in Hampshire, England

Coordinates: 51°02′04″N 1°32′50″W

- Hamlet
- Barley Hill, Dunbridge

- Location within Hampshire
- OS grid reference: SU 31846 26209
- District: Test Valley
- Shire county: Hampshire
- Region: South East
- Country: England
- Sovereign state: United Kingdom
- Post town: ROMSEY
- Postcode district: SO51
- Dialling code: 01794
- Police: Hampshire and Isle of Wight
- Fire: Hampshire and Isle of Wight
- Ambulance: South Central
- UK Parliament: Romsey and Southampton North

Dunbridge is a hamlet in the Test Valley district of Hampshire, England. It is on the River Dun, a tributary of the River Test. Its nearest town is Romsey, which lies approximately 3.75 miles (6 km) south-east from the village.

Domesday Book records the manor of Denebrugg being held by one Gilbert de Breteville.

The hamlet is served by Mottisfont & Dunbridge railway station on the Wessex Main Line. There is one pub, the Mill Arms.
