= Buckholt, Hampshire =

Hamlet and civil parish in Hampshire, England

Coordinates: 51.088°N 1.605°W

Buckholt
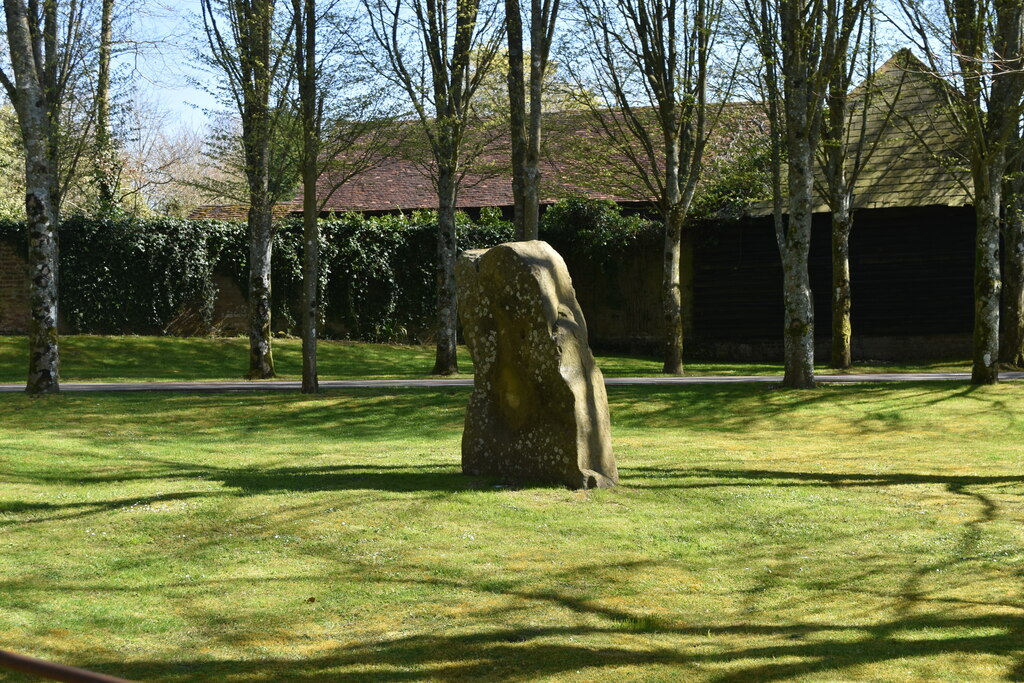
- Standing stone at Buckholt House

- Location within Hampshire
- Population: 17
- OS grid reference: SU277321
  - London: 70 miles (110 km) ENE
- District: Test Valley
- Shire county: Hampshire
- Region: South East
- Country: England
- Sovereign state: United Kingdom
- Post town: Salisbury
- Postcode district: SP5
- Police: Hampshire and Isle of Wight
- Fire: Hampshire and Isle of Wight
- Ambulance: South Central
- UK Parliament: Romsey and Southampton North

Buckholt is a hamlet and civil parish in the Test Valley district of Hampshire, England, close to the border with Wiltshire. According to the 2001 census it had a population of 17. The parish is about 10 miles (16 km) north of Romsey.
