= Edgar Fay =

British judge

Edgar Stewart Fay QC (8 October 1908 – 14 November 2009) was a British barrister and Official Referee of the Supreme Court. He was the son of Sir Sam Fay, General Manager of the Great Central Railway and was educated at McGill University, and Pembroke College, Cambridge. He conducted inquiries into the collapse of the Crown Agents and the Munich air disaster.
