= Waleran the Hunter =

Anglo-Norman magnate

Waleran the Hunter (floruit 1086) (Latin: Waleran Venator) was an Anglo-Norman magnate who held 51 manors as recorded in the Domesday Book of 1086, including Whaddon in Wiltshire and several in Hampshire, including West Dean, within the New Forest. His Latin name (perhaps an epithet) as recorded in the Domesday Book, Venator ("the Hunter"), suggests that he was a hunt-official of that royal forest. Little else is known about him.

== Descendants ==
His descendants assumed the surname Waleran, and Waldron one of the descendants in a junior line of which was Robert Walerand (died 1273), Justiciar to King Henry III. The senior line of the family retained the manor of West Dean until the death of Walter Waleran (d. circa 1200), who left three daughters and co-heiresses:

- Cecily Waleran, wife of John de Monmouth, of Monmouth, Monmouthshire, Manston, Maiden Newton, and Sutton Waldron, Dorset, Hewelsfield, Gloucestershire, West Dean (in West Tytherley), Hampshire, Great Wishford and Steeple Langford, Wiltshire, Birtsmorton, Worcestershire, etc., Governor of St. Briavel's Castle, Keeper of New Forest, Justice of South Wales. They had one son, John.
- Isabel Waleran, wife of William de Neville.
- Aubrey Waleran, wife firstly of Robert de Pole, secondly of John de Ingham and thirdly of William de Botreaux.

== Sources ==
- Victoria County History, Vol.4: Hampshire, 1911, pp.519–524, Parishes: West Tytherley with Buckholt, Manors: West Dean
