= East Dean, Hampshire =

Village and parish in Hampshire, England

Coordinates: 51.037°N 1.609°W

East Dean
- Location within Hampshire
- OS grid reference: SU275265
- District: Test Valley
- Shire county: Hampshire
- Region: South East
- Country: England
- Sovereign state: United Kingdom
- Post town: Romsey
- Postcode district: SP11
- Dialling code: 01264
- Police: Hampshire and Isle of Wight
- Fire: Hampshire and Isle of Wight
- Ambulance: South Central
- UK Parliament: Romsey and Southampton North

East Dean is a civil parish and small village in the Test Valley district of Hampshire, England, about 6 miles (10 km) northwest of Romsey. The village is mentioned in the Domesday Book as "Dene", appears as "Estdena" in 1167, and as "Dune" in 1212.

East Dean was held with the priory and manor of Mottisfont by the Briwere family and later the Mill family. John Barker-Mill inherited East Dean House, a Grade II listed building, in 1835. He died childless and East Dean House was passed by his widow to her in-laws, the Curzons.

The village is on the right (south) bank of the River Dun. The former Salisbury and Southampton Canal followed the river valley, as does the railway which now forms the Salisbury-Southampton section of the Wessex Main Line.

== Church ==
The parish church of St Winfrith dates in part from the 11th century and is a Grade II* listed building. The church underwent a restoration in 1894–5. The font dates to the 15th century and was brought from West Tytherley. A stained glass window was installed in 1908.
