= Kimbridge =

Village in Hampshire, England

Coordinates: 51.025564°N 1.534814°W

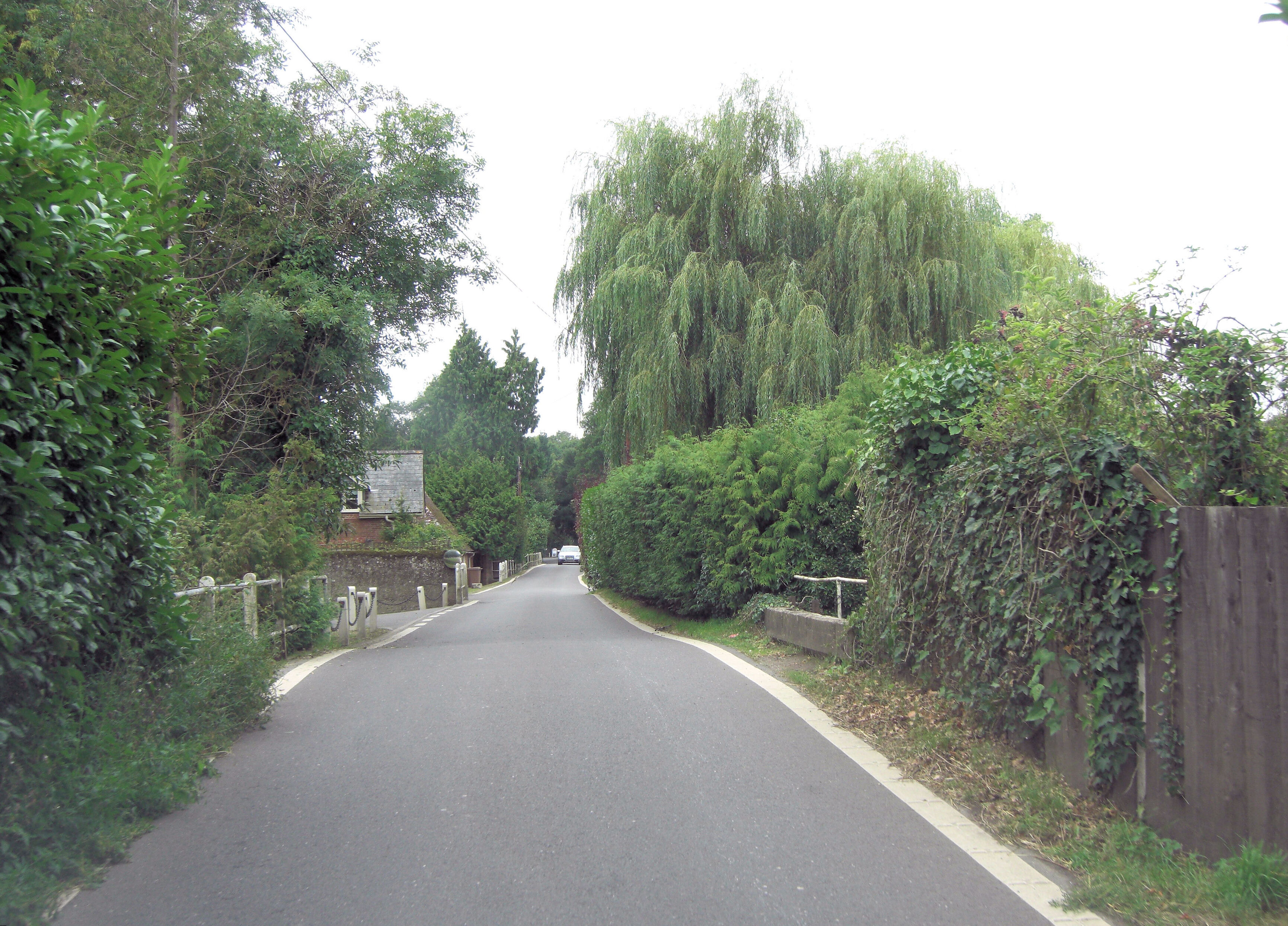
- Bridge across the River Test in Kimbridge

- Location within Hampshire
- Population: 177
- OS grid reference: SU3272125236
- Civil parish: Mottisfont
- District: Test Valley
- Shire county: Hampshire
- Region: South East
- Country: England
- Sovereign state: United Kingdom
- Post town: ROMSEY
- Postcode district: SO51
- Dialling code: 01794
- Police: Hampshire and Isle of Wight
- Fire: Hampshire and Isle of Wight
- Ambulance: South Central
- UK Parliament: North West Hampshire

Kimbridge is a small village in Mottisfont civil parish in the Test Valley district of Hampshire, England. Its nearest town is Romsey, which lies approximately 4 miles (6.3 km) south-east. Originally called "King's Bridge" in Civil War times. According to the 2011 census, the population was approximately 144. It consists mainly of a Cafe / Restaurant, a day ticket fishery and a private Trout fishing club. Most of the area is owned and managed by Kimbridge Estates, but there are a small number of private houses - including a large mansion on the water's edge. The bridge itself is on some of the best fishing waterway in the country. The Test Way long-distance footpath passes through the village, as does the Cardiff-Southampton railway; the nearest railway station is Mottisfont & Dunbridge to the north-west. Kimbridge Junction on the so-called Sprat and Winkle Line was located in Kimbridge.
