= West Tytherley =

Village and parish in Hampshire, England

Coordinates: 51.067°N 1.610°W

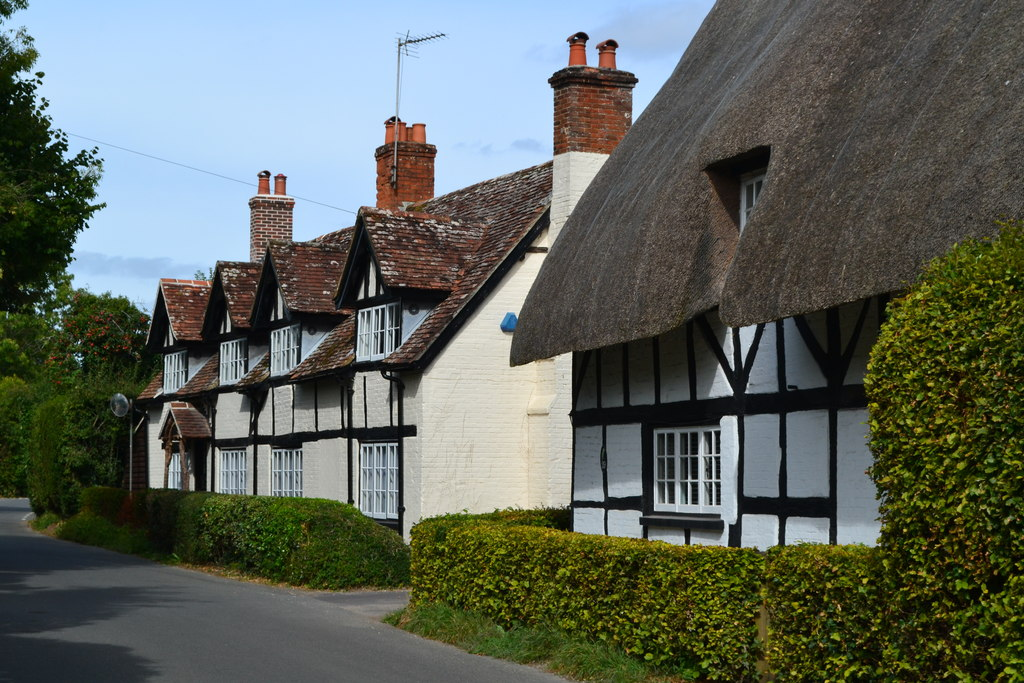
- Cottages near the recreation ground, West Tytherley

- Location within Hampshire
- Population: 527 (2001)
- OS grid reference: SU273298
- Civil parish: West Tytherley
- District: Test Valley
- Shire county: Hampshire
- Region: South East
- Country: England
- Sovereign state: United Kingdom
- Post town: SALISBURY
- Postcode district: SP5
- Dialling code: 01794
- Police: Hampshire and Isle of Wight
- Fire: Hampshire and Isle of Wight
- Ambulance: South Central
- UK Parliament: North West Hampshire

West Tytherley is a village and civil parish in the Test Valley district of Hampshire, England. Its nearest town is Stockbridge, which lies approximately 6 miles (10 km) north-east from the village, although its post town is Salisbury. The parish shares a joint parish council with the neighbouring parish of Frenchmoor.

The church of St Winfrith in East Dean, Hampshire has a 15th-century font from West Tytherley churchyard.
