= East Anton =

Suburb of Andover, Hampshire, England

Coordinates: 51.222045°N 1.441484°W

- Location within Hampshire
- OS grid reference: SU3910147131
- District: Test Valley
- Shire county: Hampshire
- Region: South East
- Country: England
- Sovereign state: United Kingdom
- Post town: ANDOVER
- Postcode district: SP11
- Dialling code: 01264
- Police: Hampshire and Isle of Wight
- Fire: Hampshire and Isle of Wight
- Ambulance: South Central
- UK Parliament: North West Hampshire

East Anton is a suburb and housing development of Andover in the Test Valley district of Hampshire, England. It lies 1.5 miles (2.1 km) north-east from Andover. Formerly, it was a hamlet made up of two farms and related buildings.

== History ==
Both the 1895 and 1969 OS maps indicate East Anton was a small, rural hamlet, made up of two farms; "East Anton Farm" and "Little East Anton Farm". Additionally, "Redbrick Cottages" (now demolished) were located to the south, on the Icknield way.

East Anton remained isolated until the latter end of the 20th century with the continued rapid growth of Andover (as an overspill town, although later on from the initial plans) and the housing developments in the areas of Kingsway Gardens and Roman Way

Nonetheless, East Anton remained separate from Andover for some years, with the urban area stopping at the Icknield Way and agricultural land providing distance between the two settlements.

However, In 2012 (although development started in 2008) the land surrounding East Anton was declared a "Major Development Area" (MDA) with proposals for 2,500 houses, including 40% affordable housing.

By 2019 a significant amount of development was complete, with a primary school, a community centre, a sports ground and a new woods all added. The development is not scheduled to be completed until 2028, although as of 2019, 1875 houses are occupied.

Four buildings from the original East Anton hamlet are grade two listed; a granary, a barn, a farmhouse and the manor.

The entire development is known as "Augusta Park". "Saxon Heights" and "The Chariots" are sub-sections of the development.
