= River Dun (River Test) =

River in Hampshire, England

Coordinates: 51°02′22″N 1°37′33″W

River Dun, near Dunbridge

The River Dun is a chalk stream and a tributary of the River Test in southern England, which flows for 18.3 km (11.4 miles) in a generally easterly direction through rural parts of Wiltshire and Hampshire.

== Etymology ==
The name is derived from an Old English word for a hill, dūn, which itself was taken from the Celtic word duno, also meaning hill. The word dūn was very widely used during the Anglo-Saxon period for describing areas and places.

== Course ==
The river rises to the east of Salisbury near Clarendon Park, where it has been dammed to form a lake. It flows south towards West Grimstead, then turns east and crosses the county border into Hampshire as it passes between the villages of West Dean and East Dean. After passing north of Lockerley and Dunbridge, it joins the Test near Kimbridge. The Test ultimately drains into Southampton Water.

The valley is followed by the Southampton to Salisbury railway and bore the route of the Salisbury and Southampton Canal between Kimbridge and East Grimstead, marked as (the) Old/old canal on many modern maps.
