= West Dean, Wiltshire =

Village in Wiltshire, England

Coordinates: 51.044°N 1.635°W

West Dean
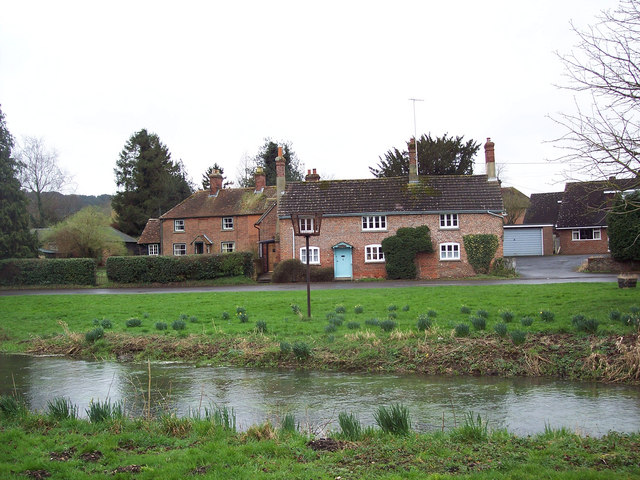
- Cottages, West Dean

- Location within Wiltshire
- Population: 252 (in 2011)
- OS grid reference: SU257273
- Civil parish: West Dean
- Unitary authority: Wiltshire
- Ceremonial county: Wiltshire
- Region: South West
- Country: England
- Sovereign state: United Kingdom
- Post town: Salisbury
- Postcode district: SP5
- Dialling code: 01794
- Police: Wiltshire
- Fire: Dorset and Wiltshire
- Ambulance: South Western
- UK Parliament: Salisbury
- Website: westdeanvillage.co.uk

West Dean is a village and civil parish in southeast Wiltshire, England; the Wiltshire/Hampshire border runs through the eastern part of the village. The village is on the River Dun, about 7 miles (11 km) east of Salisbury and the same distance northwest of Romsey.

== History ==
A Roman villa site straddles the present-day Wiltshire/Hampshire border. The village was mentioned in the Cartularium Saxonicum for the year 880 as (æt) Deone, and may have formed part of the inheritance of Aethelweard, youngest son of King Alfred. Two manors called Duene are recorded in the Domesday Book of 1086, one in Hampshire and one in Wiltshire, both among the many holdings of Waleran the Hunter. The name Westdone occurs in 1265, and Westdune in 1270.

In the north of the present village, overlooking the river, is a mound around 53m in diameter and up to 2.9m high, which is the remains of a Norman motte castle. Dean House, which straddles the border with Hampshire, is a Grade II* listed former rectory from the late 17th century, enlarged in the 18th. A large 17th-century barn at Church Farm is also Grade II* listed.

The two manors became separate church parishes. The late 19th century saw the Wiltshire parish become West Dean civil parish, while the Hampshire parish became part of West Tytherley parish.

The Salisbury and Southampton Canal was opened through the parish in 1802 or 1803 but was never completed as far as Salisbury; it closed in 1806. The Wessex Main Line railway was built through the village in 1847, with Dean station where it crosses the road at a level crossing. The station is still in use.

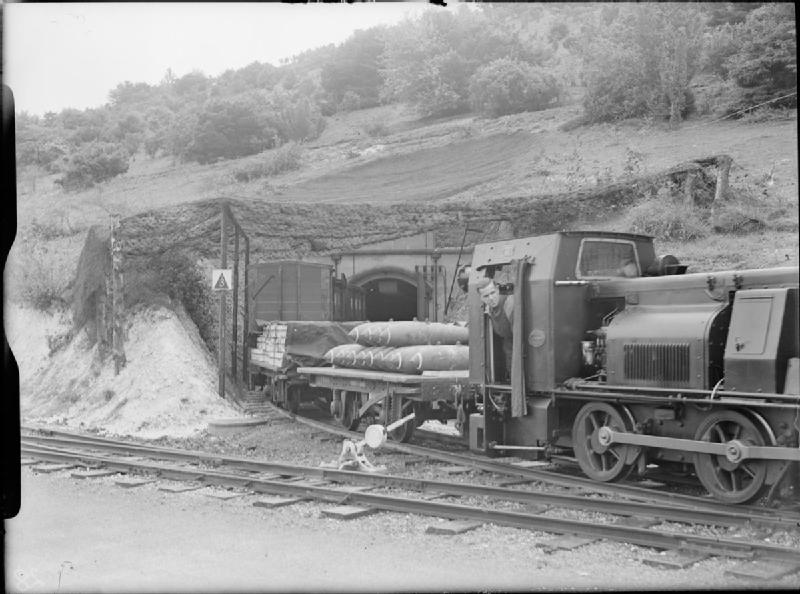
Munitions leave the wartime depot

From 1941 to 2003, chalk caverns under Dean Hill to the south of the village were used as a Royal Naval Armaments Depot for munitions storage and maintenance.

The northern part of the village, extending south beyond the railway to Moody's Hill, was designated as a Conservation Area in 1990.

== Religious sites ==
The two ancient parishes each had a church. The parishes were united in 1474, with the Hampshire church of All Saints becoming a chapelry; it was demolished at an unknown date, well before the 19th century.

=== Borbach Chantry ===
An early church stood to the northwest of the present village. Most of it was demolished in 1868, leaving only the chantry chapel known as Borbach Chantry, built in 1333 for Robert de Borbach. A Grade I listed building, in 1973 it was placed into the care of the Redundant Churches Fund which is now the Churches Conservation Trust.

=== Parish church ===
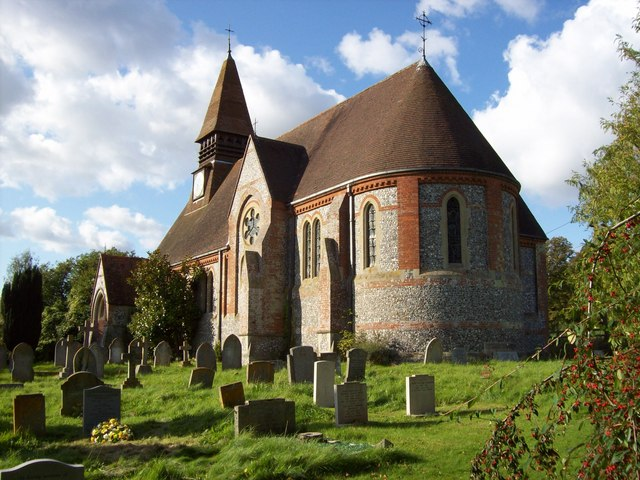
St Mary's Church

The church of St Mary the Virgin was built in 1866 as a replacement for the earlier church. Its site, provided by Thomas Baring, is 250 metres to the southeast and more central to the present village. In flint with red brick decoration and some Bath stone, it has a nave and apsidal chancel, and at the west end a timber bell-turret below a tiled spire.

Items transferred from the old church include three bells and the font bowl (probably 12th-century). Two 12th-century capitals form part of the support of the lectern. There is an aumbrey from the 13th or 14th centuries, and a piscina of similar age.

Six windows by Morris & Co. were made in 1916–17. The church was designated as Grade II listed in 1987.

Holy Trinity church at East Grimstead was anciently a chapelry of West Dean. The benefices of West Dean and Alderbury were united in 1971, and in 1983 the benefice of West Dean with East Grimstead was combined with that of Farley with Pitton. Today the parish is part of the Clarendon group of churches, alongside nine others in this rural part of Wiltshire.

=== Methodism ===
A Wesleyan Methodist chapel was built c.1870 and closed in 1971.

== Woodland ==
Much of the northern half of the parish is woodland, including Bentley Wood which contains a biological Site of Special Scientific Interest.

== Notable people ==
Dean House was bought in 1618 by John Evelyn (1601–1685), later a Member of Parliament; the property descended by marriage to the Pierreponts, including Evelyn Pierrepont, 1st Duke of Kingston-upon-Hull (1665–1726). Later owners include (from 1823) Charles Baring Wall, also an MP, and son of a partner in Barings Bank. He also owned the Norman Court Estate, a large area of woodland and farmland on both sides of the county border and centred on Norman Court House, an 18th-century country house just over the border in Hampshire. Thomas Baring (1826–1904) sold the estate in 1903 to Washington Singer (1866–1934), from the American sewing machine family but brought up in England; in 1945 the estate was sold and broken up, allowing some West Dean villagers to buy their houses.

Notable rectors include William Tooker, from 1588, who was chaplain to Elizabeth I and later dean of Lichfield.
