= Bossington, Hampshire =

Village and parish in Hampshire, England

Coordinates: 51.074000°N 1.525000°W

Bossington
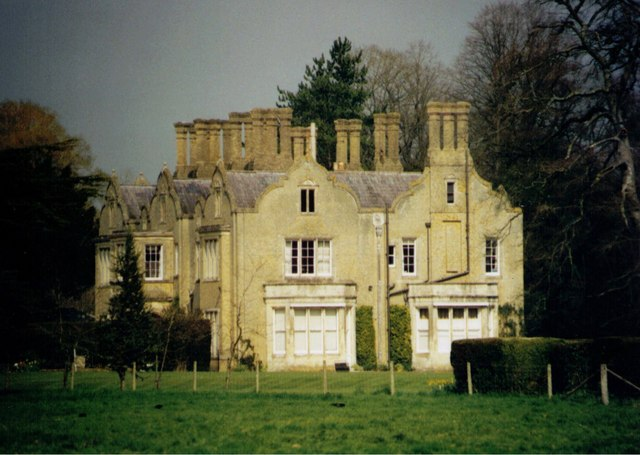
- Bossington House

- Location within Hampshire
- OS grid reference: SU3645
- District: Test Valley
- Shire county: Hampshire
- Region: South East
- Country: England
- Sovereign state: United Kingdom
- Post town: WINCHESTER
- Postcode district: SP10
- Dialling code: 01264
- Police: Hampshire and Isle of Wight
- Fire: Hampshire and Isle of Wight
- Ambulance: South Central
- UK Parliament: North West Hampshire

Bossington is a village and civil parish in the Test Valley district of Hampshire, England. According to the 2001 census it had a population of 41. The village is located by the River Test, and is about 7 miles north of Romsey.

== History ==
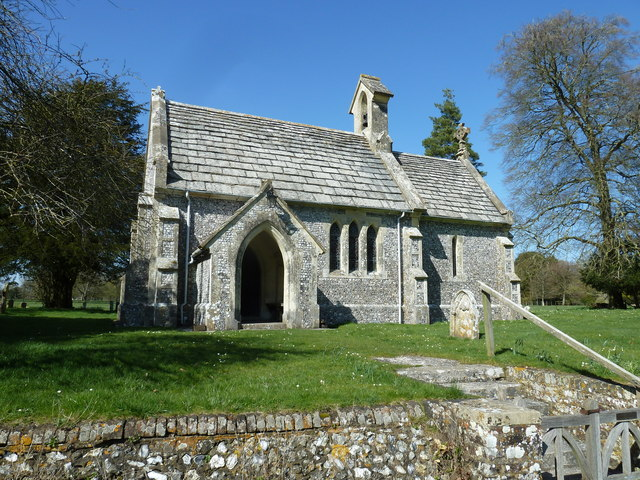
Church of St James, a Grade II listed building

The deserted medieval village of Bossington was destroyed in 1829.

The Church of St James was Grade II listed on 29 May 1957. Bossington House was Grade II listed on 7 February 1986.

Today Bossington is a popular area for nature walks and wildlife viewing.
