= Eastacombe =

Hamlet in Devon, England

Coordinates: 51°02′55″N 4°05′12″W

Valley below Eastacombe

Eastacombe is a hamlet in Tawstock parish, Devon, England, about 2 miles (3.2 km) southwest of Barnstaple. The hamlets of St John's Chapel and Stoneylands are close by, to the west.
