= Test Valley =

Coordinates: 51.1394°N 1.491°W

- Borough and non-metropolitan district
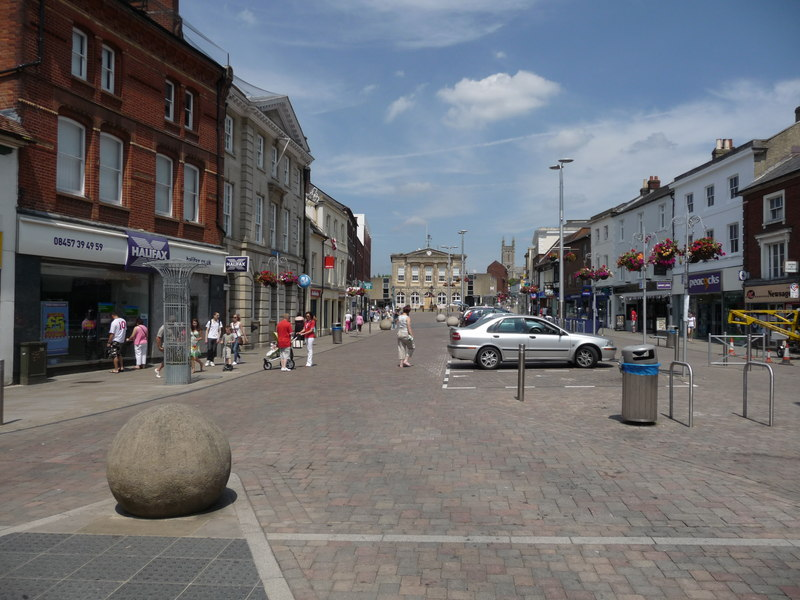
- Andover Town Centre

- Test Valley shown within Hampshire
- Sovereign state: United Kingdom
- Constituent country: England
- Region: South East England
- Non-metropolitan county: Hampshire
- Status: Non-metropolitan district
- Admin HQ: Andover
- Incorporated: 1 April 1974

Government
  - Type: Non-metropolitan district council
  - Body: Test Valley Borough Council
  - MPs: Kit Malthouse; Caroline Nokes

Area
  - Total: 242.3 sq mi (627.6 km^{2})
  - Rank: 57th (of 296)

Population (2024)
  - Total: 135,201
  - Rank: 182nd (of 296)
  - Density: 557.9/sq mi (215.4/km^{2})

Ethnicity (2021)
  - Ethnic groups: List: 93.1% White; 3.3% Asian; 1.8% Mixed; 1.1% Black; 0.8% other

Religion (2021)
  - Religion: List: 50.5% Christianity; 40.6% no religion; 5.7% not stated; 0.9% Islam; 0.8% Hinduism; 0.5% Buddhism; 0.5% other; 0.4% Sikhism; 0.1% Judaism
- Time zone: UTC0 (GMT)
  - Summer (DST): UTC+1 (BST)
- ONS code: 24UN (ONS); E07000093 (GSS)
- OS grid reference: SU3560537973

Test Valley is a local government district with borough status in Hampshire, England, named after the valley of the River Test. The council is based in the borough's largest town of Andover. The borough also contains the town of Romsey and numerous villages and surrounding rural areas. A small part of the borough at its southern end lies within the New Forest National Park, and part of the borough north of Andover lies within the North Wessex Downs, a designated Area of Outstanding Natural Beauty.

The neighbouring districts are Basingstoke and Deane, Winchester, and Eastleigh to the east, Southampton and New Forest to the south, Wiltshire to the west and West Berkshire to the north.

== History ==
The district was created on 1 April 1974 under the Local Government Act 1972, covering the area of four former districts which were all abolished at the same time:

- Andover Municipal Borough
- Andover Rural District
- Romsey Municipal Borough
- Romsey and Stockbridge Rural District

The new district was named Test Valley after the River Test which flows through the area. The district was awarded borough status on 22 October 1976, allowing the chair of the council to take the title of mayor.

In March 2026, the government announced that it would abolish the borough in 2028 as part of local government reform across Hampshire. These proposals were withdrawn in September 2026.

== Governance ==
Test Valley Borough Council

Type
- Type: Non-metropolitan district

Leadership
- Mayor: Linda Lashbrook, Conservative since 13 May 2026
- Leader: Phil North, Conservative since 10 May 2017
- Chief Executive: Andy Ferrier since 15 June 2020

Structure
- Seats: 43 councillors
- Graph of the party split among 43 seats.
- Political groups: Administration (25) Conservative (25) Other parties (18) Liberal Democrats (16) Independent (2)
- Length of term: 4 years

Elections
- Last election: 4 May 2023

Meeting place
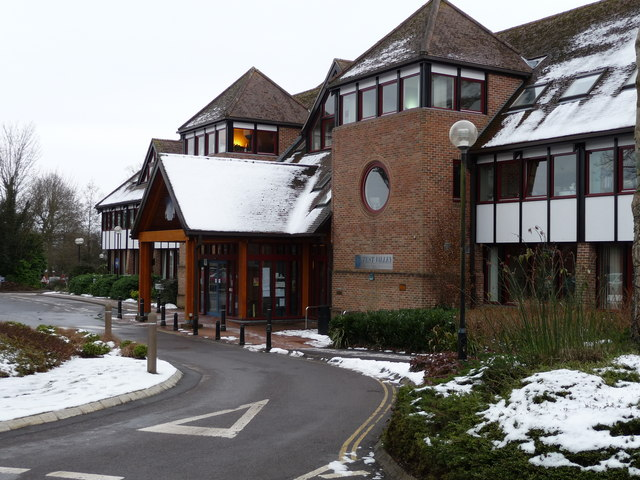
- Beech Hurst, Weyhill Road, Andover, SP10 3AJ

Website
- www.testvalley.gov.uk

Test Valley Borough Council provides district-level services. County-level services are provided by Hampshire County Council. The whole district is also covered by civil parishes, which form a third tier of local government.

In the part of the borough within the New Forest National Park, town planning is the responsibility of the New Forest National Park Authority. The borough council appoints one of its councillors to serve on the 22-person National Park Authority.

=== Political control ===
The council has been under Conservative majority control since 1999.

The first election to the council was held in 1973, initially acting as a shadow authority alongside the outgoing authorities until the new arrangements took effect on 1 April 1974. Political control since 1974 has been as follows:

Party in control	Years
Independent	1974–1976
No overall control	1976–1979
Conservative	1979–1995
No overall control	1995–1999
Conservative	1999–present

=== Leadership ===
The role of mayor is largely ceremonial in Test Valley. Political leadership is instead provided by the leader of the council. The leaders since 1980 have been:

Councillor	Party	From	To	Notes
John Morgan	Conservative	1980	1985	
Roy Perry	Conservative	1985	4 May 1994	
Eileen Haselden	Conservative	4 May 1994	17 May 1995	
Eileen Haselden	Conservative	17 May 1995	14 May 1997	Joint leaders
Mark Cooper	Liberal Democrats	17 May 1995	14 May 1997	Joint leaders
Mark Cooper	Liberal Democrats	14 May 1997	6 May 1998	
Norman Arnell	Conservative	6 May 1998	19 May 1999	
Ian Carr	Conservative	19 May 1999	10 May 2017	
Phil North	Conservative	10 May 2017		

=== Composition ===
Following the 2023 election, and subsequent changes up to June 2026, the composition of the council was:

Party	Councillors
Conservative	25
Liberal Democrats	16
Independent	2
Total	43

=== Elections ===
Since the last boundary changes in 2019 the council has comprised 43 councillors representing 20 wards, with each ward electing one, two or three councillors. Elections are held every four years.

=== Premises ===
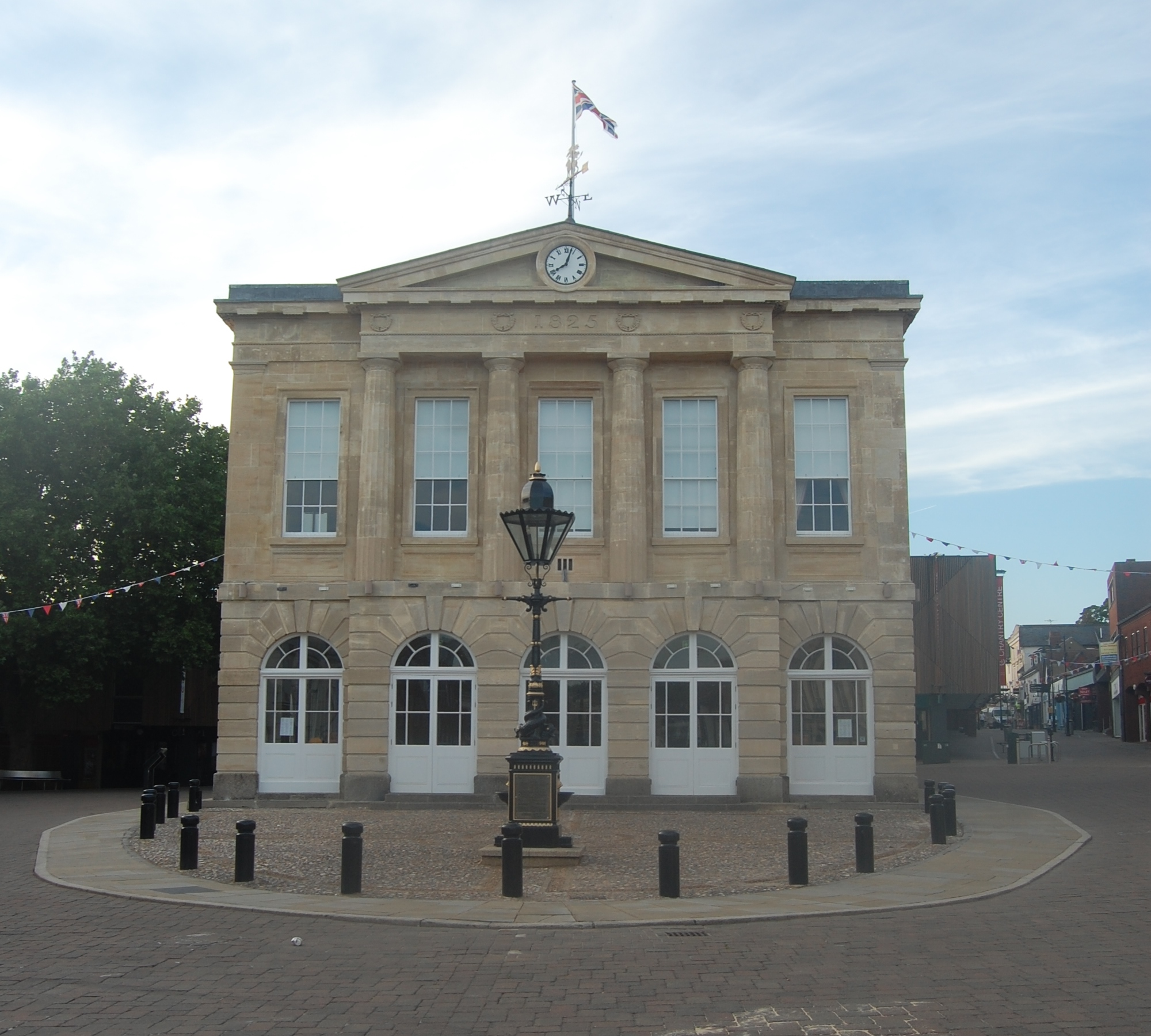
Andover Guildhall, one of the council's meeting places.

The council has its main offices at Beech Hurst in Andover. The site had previously been a large house built in the 1850s, which had been purchased in 1947 by the old Andover Borough Council to use as its headquarters. The house continued to serve as offices for Test Valley after the new council's creation in 1974 until 1990 when it was demolished and replaced by a modern building on the same site, retaining the Beech Hurst name. The council also maintains a smaller office at the former Magistrates' Court on Church Street in Romsey. Full council meetings are held alternately at Andover Guildhall and at Crosfield Hall in Romsey.

== Geography ==
Test Valley covers some 250 square miles (650 km^{2}) of western Hampshire, stretching from boundaries with Southampton in the south to near Newbury in the north. Test Valley is a predominantly rural area. It includes part of the North Wessex Downs Area of Outstanding Natural Beauty.

The River Test is the centrepiece of the Test Valley; the river is a chalk stream of particular beauty known for its fishing, salmon and trout, which Lord Crickhowell (onetime chairman of the National Rivers Authority) said "should be treated as a great work of art or music". Stockbridge is home of the Houghton Fishing Club, an exclusive fishing club founded in 1822, which meets in the Grosvenor Hotel.

== Demographics ==
In December 2006, Sport England published a survey which revealed that residents of Test Valley were the 8th most active in England in sports and other fitness activities. 26.9% of the population participate at least 3 times a week for 30 minutes.

In March 2012 Test Valley was ranked 14th best rural area to live out of 119 local authority areas in Great Britain by the Halifax. This was based on factors including employment and income levels, the weather, health and life expectancy, education, crime, broadband access and other things.

== Towns and parishes ==
The whole borough is covered by civil parishes. The parish councils for Andover and Romsey have declared their parishes to be towns, allowing them to take the style "town council". Whilst Stockbridge is a post town it has a parish council rather than a town council. Some of the smaller parishes have a parish meeting rather than a parish council. The parishes of Frenchmoor and West Tytherley share a grouped parish council.

Name	Status	Population	Area (ha)	Population density (people/ha)	Ward/s
Abbotts Ann	Civil Parish	1,331	1281.75	1.02	Anna; Andover Millway
Ampfield	Civil Parish	1,762	966.32	1.81	Ampfield & Braishfield
Amport	Civil Parish	1,228	1619.52	0.76	Anna
Andover	Town	50,887	2087.37	24.43	Andover Downlands; Andover Harroway; Andover Romans; Andover St Mary's; Andover Winton; Andover Millway; Anna
Appleshaw	Civil Parish	606	584.76	1.03	Bellinger
Ashley	Civil Parish	68	764.74	0.09	Mid Test
Awbridge	Civil Parish	767	482.7	1.58	Blackwater
Barton Stacey	Civil Parish	1,049	2031.51	0.52	Harewood
Bossington	Civil Parish	58	607.71	0.1	Mid Test
Braishfield	Civil Parish	688	983.19	0.7	Ampfield & Braishfield
Broughton	Civil Parish	1,079	1533.58	0.7	Mid Test
Buckholt	Civil Parish	16	350.42	0.05	Mid Test
Bullington	Civil Parish	110	661.22	0.17	Harewood
Charlton	Civil Parish	2,048	245.19	8.41	Charlton & the Pentons
Chilbolton	Civil Parish	978	1267.71	0.77	Harewood
Chilworth	Civil Parish	1,177	1062.6	1.15	Chilworth, Nurslings & Rownhams
East Dean	Civil Parish	239	433.2	0.54	Mid Test
East Tytherley	Civil Parish	187	1061.37	0.18	Mid Test
Enham Alamein	Civil Parish	773	346.58	3	Bourne Valley; Andover Romans
Faccombe	Civil Parish	96	1079.44	0.09	Bourne Valley
Frenchmoor	Civil Parish	45	153.81	0.29	Mid Test
Fyfield	Civil Parish	338	224.38	1.52	Bellinger
Goodworth Clatford	Civil Parish	747	1141.87	0.65	Anna
Grateley	Civil Parish	664	627.82	1.06	Anna
Houghton	Civil Parish	467	1081.72	0.44	Mid Test
Hurstbourne Tarrant	Civil Parish	855	1957.09	0.44	Bourne Valley
Kimpton	Civil Parish	365	1122.16	0.33	Bellinger
King's Somborne	Civil Parish	1,627	2722.87	0.6	Mid Test
Leckford	Civil Parish	133	915.92	0.15	Mid Test
Linkenholt	Civil Parish	44	434.02	0.1	Bourne Valley
Little Somborne	Civil Parish	82	783.83	0.1	Mid Test
Lockerley	Civil Parish	825	624.02	1.33	Mid Test
Longparish	Civil Parish	653	2156.02	0.3	Harewood
Longstock	Civil Parish	467	1207.97	0.39	Mid Test
Melchet Park and Plaitford	Civil Parish	389	754.42	0.51	Blackwater
Michelmersh and Timsbury	Civil Parish	915	1127.85	0.81	Blackwater; Ampfield & Braishfield
Monxton	Civil Parish	279	449.97	0.62	Anna
Mottisfont	Civil Parish	406	1185.36	0.34	Mid Test
Nether Wallop	Civil Parish	895	2983.05	0.3	Mid Test
North Baddesley	Civil Parish	7,164	779.88	9.19	North Baddesley
Nursling and Rownhams	Civil Parish	5,605	1169.78	4.72	Chilworth, Nurslings & Rownhams
Over Wallop	Civil Parish	2,429	1891.28	1.28	Anna; Mid Test
Penton Grafton	Civil Parish	794	763.37	1.04	Charlton & the Pentons
Penton Mewsey	Civil Parish	394	431.06	0.94	Charlton & the Pentons
Quarley	Civil Parish	150	648.25	0.22	Anna
Romsey	Town	21,540	3623.53	5.94	Blackwater; Romsey Cupernham; Ampfield & Braishfield; Romsey Tadburn; Romsey Abbey; Chilworth, Nurslings & Rownhams
Sherfield English	Civil Parish	707	850.78	0.83	Blackwater
Shipton Bellinger	Civil Parish	1,493	1034.62	1.45	Bellinger
Smannell	Civil Parish	495	589.14	0.49	Bourne Valley; Andover Romans
Stockbridge	Civil Parish	553	585.72	0.96	Mid Test
Tangley	Civil Parish	542	1615.97	0.34	Bourne Valley
Thruxton	Civil Parish	620	632.97	0.97	Bellinger
Upper Clatford	Civil Parish	1,613	937.18	1.72	Anna
Valley Park	Civil Parish	7,381	273.73	27	Valley Park; North Baddesley; Chilworth, Nurslings & Rownhams
Vernham Dean	Civil Parish	488	1585.02	0.31	Bourne Valley
Wellow	Civil Parish	3,409	1565.22	2.16	Blackwater
West Tytherley	Civil Parish	568	1180.36	0.48	Mid Test
Wherwell	Civil Parish	454	1469.98	0.31	Harewood

== Transport ==
=== Rail ===
There are three rail lines in service in Test Valley; these being the West of England line, Wessex Main Line and Eastleigh–Romsey line. On the West of England line are Andover railway station and Grateley railway station. From Andover there are half-hourly trains to London Waterloo via Basingstoke, plus half-hourly trains to Salisbury, with some continuing to destinations such as Exeter St Davids and Yeovil Junction. Grateley operates hourly trains in both directions. Both of these stations are only served by SWR. On the Wessex Main line are Romsey railway station and Mottisfont & Dunbridge railway station, plus Dean railway station which is located just across the Wiltshire border in West Dean. All three stations are operated by SWR, Romsey is also served by GWR. Mottisfont & Dunbridge and Dean are served by trains towards Salisbury, and trains towards Romsey, where they loop either towards Chandler's Ford first (on the Eastleigh-Romsey line) or Redbridge, going on to call at both Southampton Central and Eastleigh, eventually looping back to Romsey, either terminating there or continuing to Salisbury. Romsey also has GWR services towards Portsmouth Harbour via Southampton and Fareham. And GWR towards Cardiff Central via Salisbury, Bath Spa, Bristol Temple Meads and Newport.

=== Bus & Coach ===
A number of bus operators operate in Test Valley. Stagecoach South has a depot in Andover, and operates most of the routes in north Test valley and Andover. Salisbury Reds and Bluestar (including Unilink), both Go-Ahead Group companies, operate most of the routes in south Test valley and Romsey.

== Media ==
=== Television ===
The area is served by BBC South and ITV Meridian with television signals received from either Rowridge or Hannington TV transmitters.

=== Radio ===
Radio stations for the area are:

- BBC Radio Berkshire
- BBC Radio Solent
- Heart South
- Greatest Hits Radio Berkshire & North Hampshire
- Andover Radio (serving Andover)
