= Mottisfont & Dunbridge railway station =

Railway station in Hampshire, England

Coordinates: 51°02′02″N 1°32′49″W

Mottisfont & Dunbridge
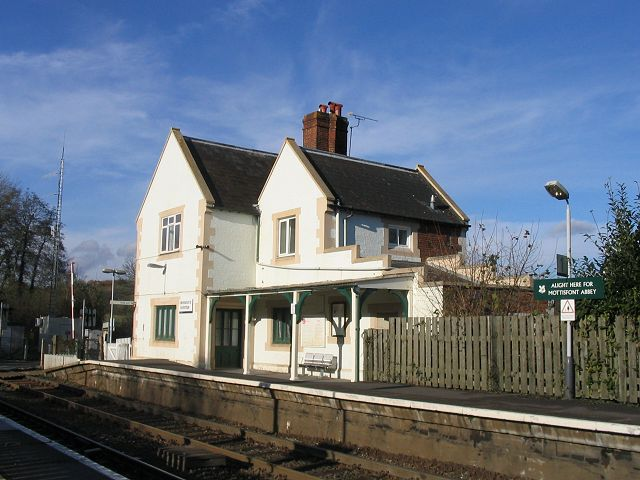

General information
- Location: Dunbridge, Test Valley; England
- Grid reference: SU318261
- Manager: South Western Railway
- Platforms: 2

Other information
- Station code: DBG
- Classification: DfT category F2

Key dates
- 1 March 1847: Opened as Dunbridge
- 15 May 1988: Renamed Mottisfont Dunbridge
- 29 May 1994: Renamed Dunbridge
- 2006: Renamed Mottisfont & Dunbridge

Passengers
- 2021/22: ▲23,726
- 2022/23: ▲24,412
- 2023/24: ▲24,978
- 2024/25: ▲28,832
- 2025/26: ▲30,978
Location
Notes
- Passenger statistics from the Office of Rail and Road

Mottisfont & Dunbridge railway station serves the village of Dunbridge in Hampshire, England. It is on the Wessex Main Line, 84 miles 21 chains (135.6 km) from London Waterloo. It is the closest station to Mottisfont Abbey and the village of Mottisfont, and was renamed Mottisfont & Dunbridge in 2006 to reflect this, having been previously known simply as Dunbridge (and also to eliminate confusion with the similar sounding station of Tonbridge in Kent). Mottisfont previously had a station of its own on the Andover to Romsey line, known as the Sprat and Winkle Line, but this closed on 7 September 1964 under the Beeching Axe.

Since 9 December 2007, a new service has served Mottisfont & Dunbridge. It runs from Salisbury to Southampton Central, via Romsey. South Western Railway operates the service using two-car Class 158 units. In consequence, Mottisfont & Dunbridge now has a roughly hourly service, a great improvement over the previous frequency. As a result of this, Great Western Railway no longer serves the station, although it continued to manage the station, and the station still carried First Great Western branding. In April 2020, the management of the station was transferred to South Western Railway.

The station is one of 20 covered by the Three Rivers Community Rail partnership.

According to station usage statistics, Mottisfont & Dunbridge is the second least frequently used station in Hampshire, with only Beaulieu Road having fewer passengers.

== Services ==
The station is managed by South Western Railway, which runs an hourly service between Romsey and Salisbury via Southampton Central. This also runs on Sundays, at a two-hourly frequency.

Preceding station	National Rail	Following station
Dean	South Western Railway; Salisbury–Romsey (via Southampton)	Romsey
