= Dean railway station =

Railway station in Wiltshire, England

Coordinates: 51°02′33″N 1°38′05″W

Dean
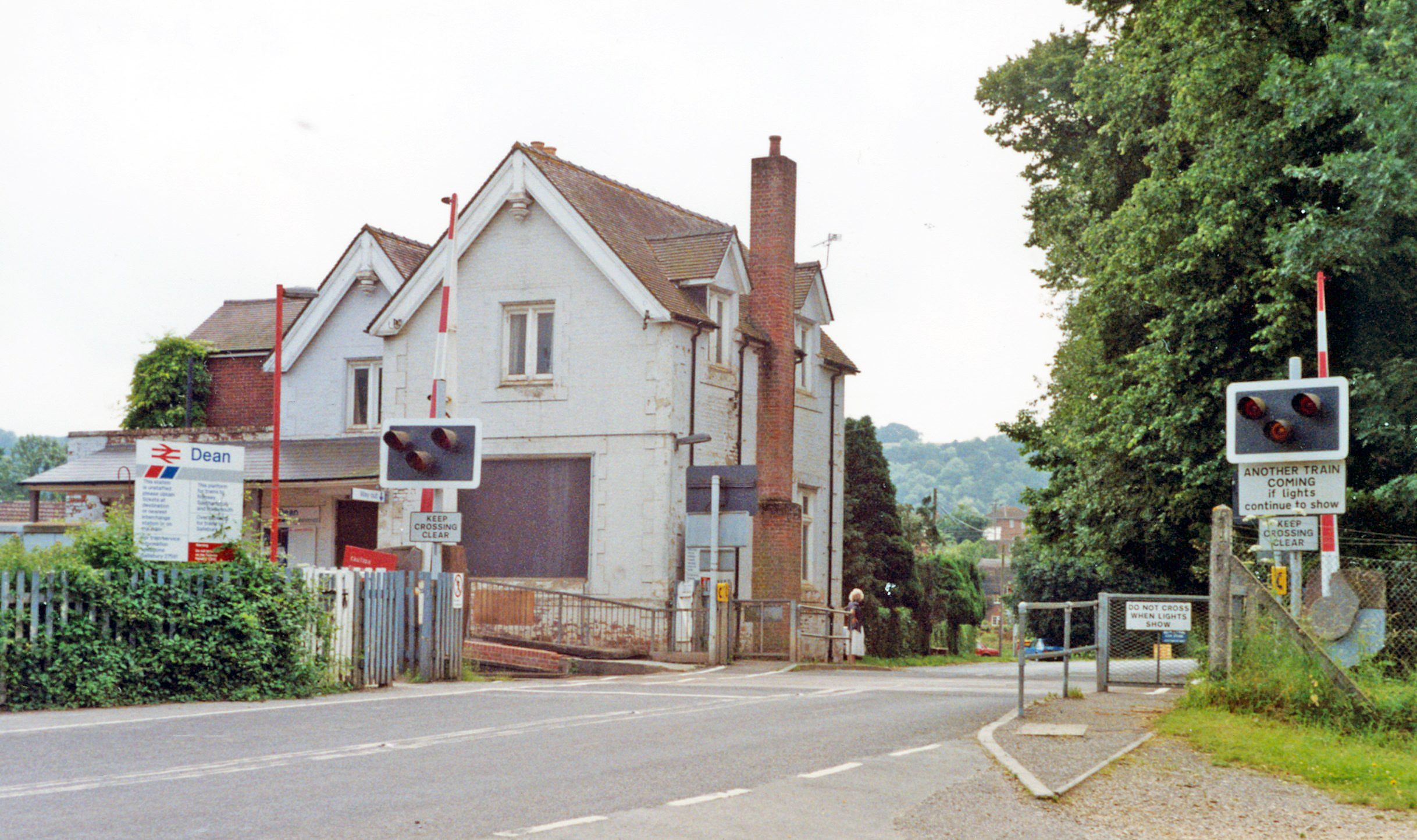
- The station building and level crossing in July 1991

General information
- Location: West Dean, Wiltshire; Test Valley (Hampshire); England
- Grid reference: SU257270
- Manager: South Western Railway
- Platforms: 2

Other information
- Station code: DEN
- Classification: DfT category F2

History
- Opened: 1 March 1847

Passengers
- 2021/22: ▲33,300
- 2022/23: ▼28,230
- 2023/24: ▲30,004
- 2024/25: ▲38,188
- 2025/26: ▲46,276
Location
Notes
- Passenger statistics from the Office of Rail and Road

Dean railway station, also shown as Dean (Wilts), serves the village of West Dean in Wiltshire, England. The station is on the Wessex Main Line, 88 miles 10 chains (141.8 km) from London Waterloo. Whilst the station building is in Wiltshire, the platforms straddle the county boundary with Hampshire.

South Western Railway (SWR) operates a regular service between Salisbury and Southampton Central via Romsey. This runs hourly during the week, with a two-hourly service on Sundays, and uses two-car Class 158 units. As a result of the introduction of the SWR service, the number of Great Western Railway (GWR) trains between Portsmouth Harbour and Cardiff that stop at Dean was reduced. Since October 2011, there have been no GWR trains stopping at Dean, and from April 2020 the management of the station was transferred from GWR to SWR.

Preceding station	National Rail	Following station
Salisbury	South Western Railway; Wessex Main Line	Mottisfont & Dunbridge
