= Mottisfont =

Village and parish in Hampshire, England

Coordinates: 51°02′22″N 1°32′14″W

- Village
- Lane through Mottisfont village

- Location within Hampshire
- Population: 351; 385 (2011 Census including Dunbridge)
- OS grid reference: SU324268
- Civil parish: Mottisfont
- District: Test Valley
- Shire county: Hampshire
- Region: South East
- Country: England
- Sovereign state: United Kingdom
- Post town: ROMSEY
- Postcode district: SO51
- Dialling code: 01794
- Police: Hampshire and Isle of Wight
- Fire: Hampshire and Isle of Wight
- Ambulance: South Central
- UK Parliament: Romsey and Southampton North

Mottisfont is a village and civil parish in the Test Valley district of Hampshire, England, around 4 miles (6.4 km) northwest of Romsey. The village is the location of Mottisfont Abbey. Much of the surrounding land, which is part of the Mottisfont Estate, and several other buildings in the village are in the care of the National Trust.

The unusual name is probably derived from the Old English motes funta, meaning 'spring near the confluence' or 'spring of the moot' or possibly 'spring of the stone' (from the Old English motere: sonte).

The village church is dedicated to St Andrew and its oldest parts date from the 12th century. Restorations were carried out in the 1870s and 1880s.

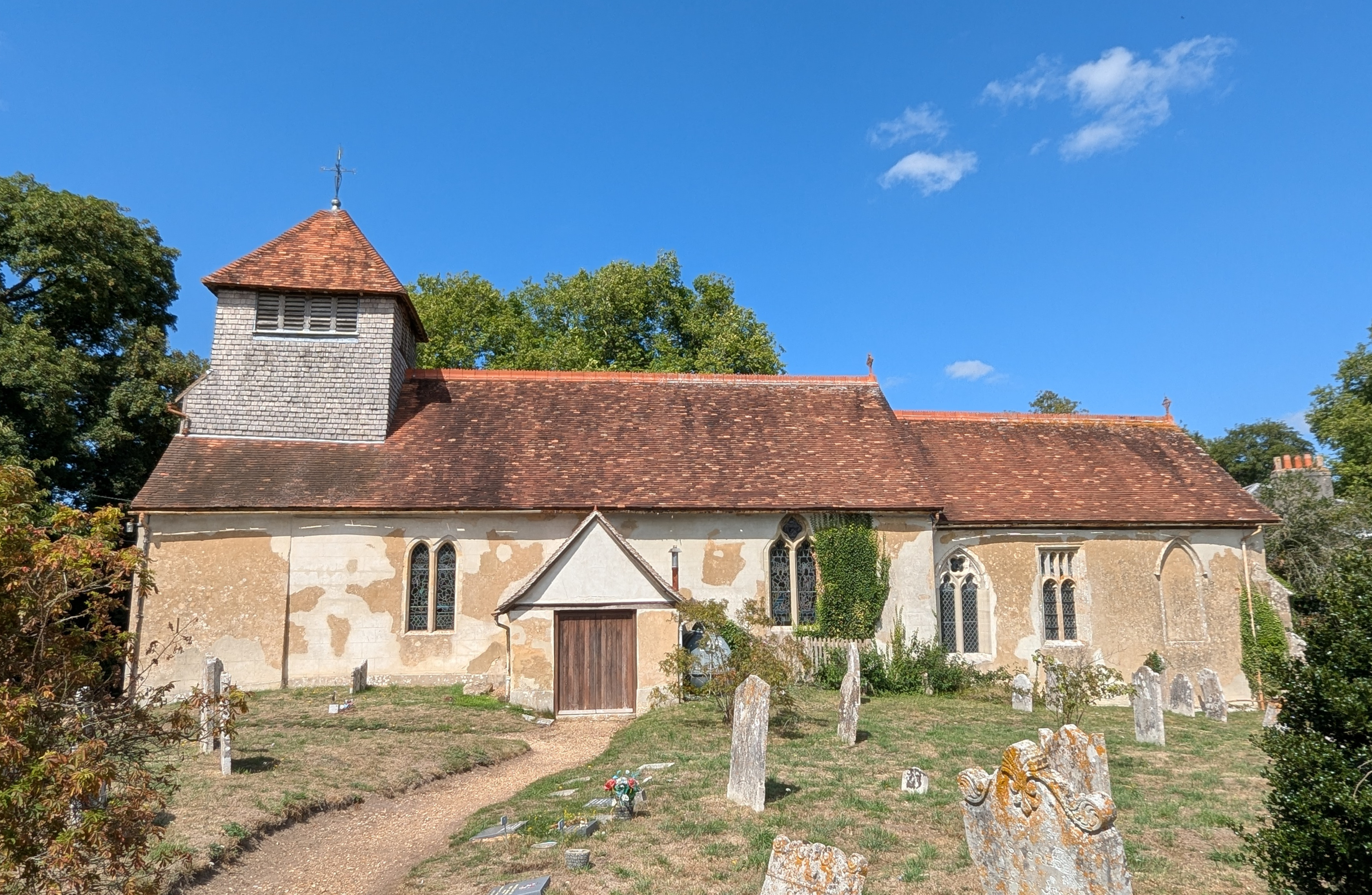
Saint Andrew's church, 2025

Mottisfont formerly had a railway station on the Sprat and Winkle Line, which closed in the 1960s. In 2006, the nearby Dunbridge station on the Wessex Main Line was renamed as Mottisfont and Dunbridge. The Test Way and Monarch's Way long-distance footpaths pass through the village.

== See also ==
- Listed buildings in Mottisfont
