= Alice Buckton =

British educator and author (1867 - 1944)

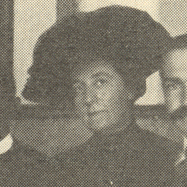
- Alice Buckton at the first Universal Races Congress in 1911
- Born: Alice Mary Buckton; 9 March 1867; Haslemere, Surrey, United Kingdom of Great Britain and Ireland
- Died: 10 December 1944 (aged 77); Wells, Somerset, United Kingdom
- Occupations: Writer; educator
- Known for: Founder of the Chalice Well Trust
- Movement: Froebelism
- Partner: Annet Schepel (died 1931)
- Parents: George Bowdler Buckton; Mary Ann Odling
- Relatives: William Odling (maternal uncle)

Alice Mary Buckton (9 March 1867 – 10 December 1944) was an English educator, poet, community playwright, feminist, Celtic revivalist and mystic.

In 1899 Buckton established a Froebelian educational institution, Sesame House, in London. Her mystery play Eager Heart, first performed in 1903, was the first of several pageant plays written or stage-managed by Buckton. A convert to the Baháʼí Faith, she recited an ode to open the 1911 First Universal Races Congress. After buying the Chalice Well in Glastonbury, she established it as a hostel in Glastonbury, helping to establish Glastonbury as a site of pilgrimage.

== Early life ==
Alice Buckton was born in Weycombe, Haslemere, on 9 March 1867. She was the eldest of seven daughters of the entomologist George Bowdler Buckton, and his wife Mary Ann Odling. She came to know Alfred Tennyson, who lived nearby, and years later still wore a cloak given her by Tennyson.

== Settlement and educational activity ==
As a young woman Alice Buckton was involved with the Women's University Settlement, which grew out of the work of Octavia Hill. She then became interested in the educational ideas of Friedrich Fröbel, and travelled to Germany to visit the Pestalozzi-Fröbel House. She managed to persuade the Principal there, Annet Schepel, to come to England and help set up a similar institution in London, the Sesame Garden and House for Home Life Training in St John's Wood. In an 1898 lecture Buckton outlined a plan for this new institution. Buckton emphasised the importance of motherhood in the thought of Pestalozzi and Fröbel, and declared the kindergarten to be part of the "woman's movement". Sesame House opened in 1899, with Patrick Geddes on the committee. One woman trained at Sesame House was Lileen Hardy, who went on to open the free kindergarten St. Saviour's Child Garden in Edinburgh. By 1902 the school at Sesame House had sixty-five students. Buckton and Schepel were partners who lived together until Schepel's death in 1931.

== Poetry and pageant plays ==
In 1901 Buckton published her first poetry collection, Through Human Eyes. Verse from the collection was later set to music by Gustav Holst as The heart worships.

Buckton's mystery play Eager Heart was first performed in Lincoln's Inn Hall in 1903. The play was an immediate success. Three decades later there had been hundreds of performances and over 41,000 published copies of the play sold.

== Baháʼí conversion ==
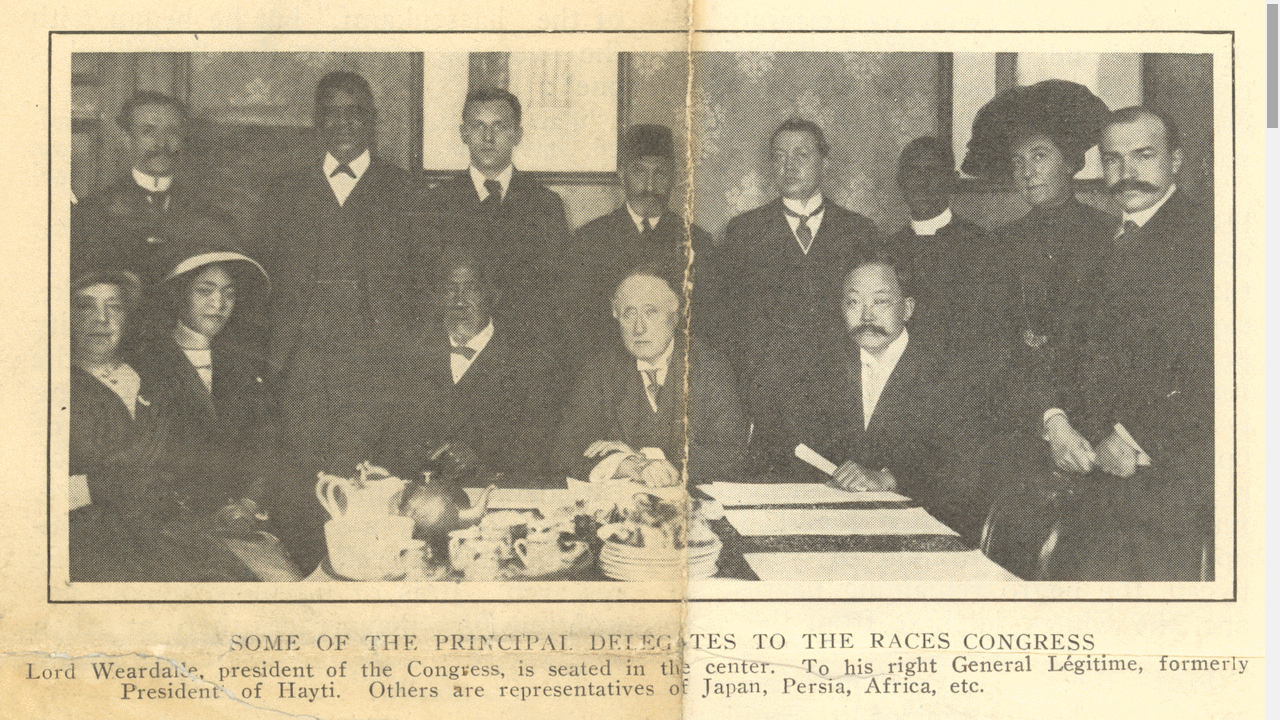
Buckton (standing second from right) as a delegate to the first Universal Races Congress, 1911

In 1908 Buckton became drawn to the Baháʼí Faith after meeting Wellesley Tudor Pole.

Buckton attended the First Universal Races Congress in London in 1911, opening proceedings with an 'Ode of Salutation' from Europe, alongside T. Ramakrishna Pillai speaking for the East and W. E. B. Du Bois speaking for Africa.

Buckton met ʻAbdu'l-Bahá several times. He visited her home in Byfleet, Surrey, and she accompanied him on his speaking tour of England in 1913.

== Glastonbury ==
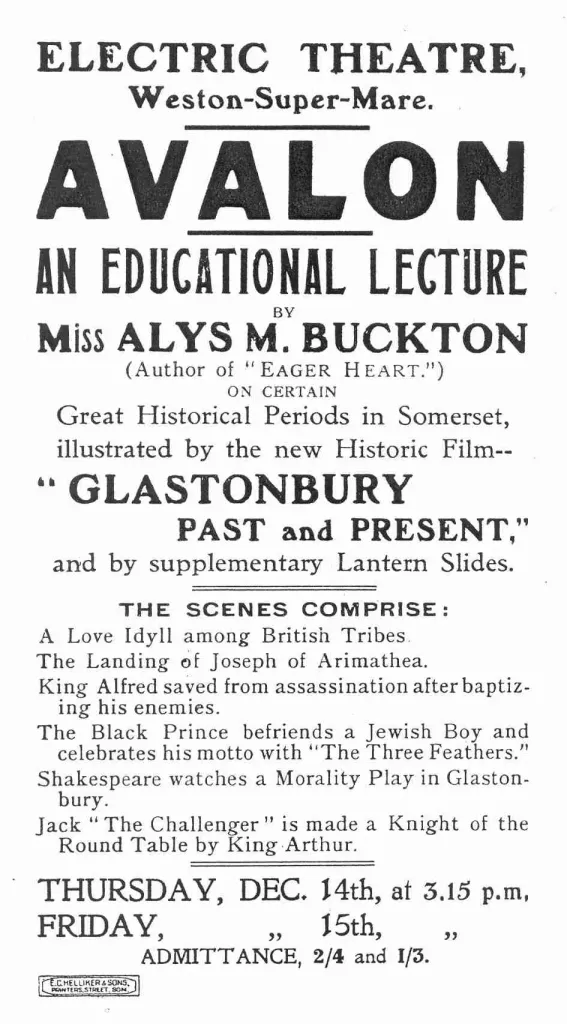
A talk and film

In 1912, Buckton bought the Chalice Well in Glastonbury. She and Schepel opened a hostel there which drew pilgrims from around the world, and Buckton continued to live in Glastonbury for the rest of her life.

In August 1913 Buckton stage-managed Caroline Cannon's Pageant of Gwent at the National Eisteddfod of Wales. The following year she supported an Arthurian festival at Glastonbury, centered around the performance of a music drama by Reginald Buckley, 'The Birth of Arthur'. She herself wrote and produced The Coming of Bride, first performed in Glastonbury on 6 August 1914. The Coming of the Dawn was written to be produced at Christmas in 1918 by the YWCA.

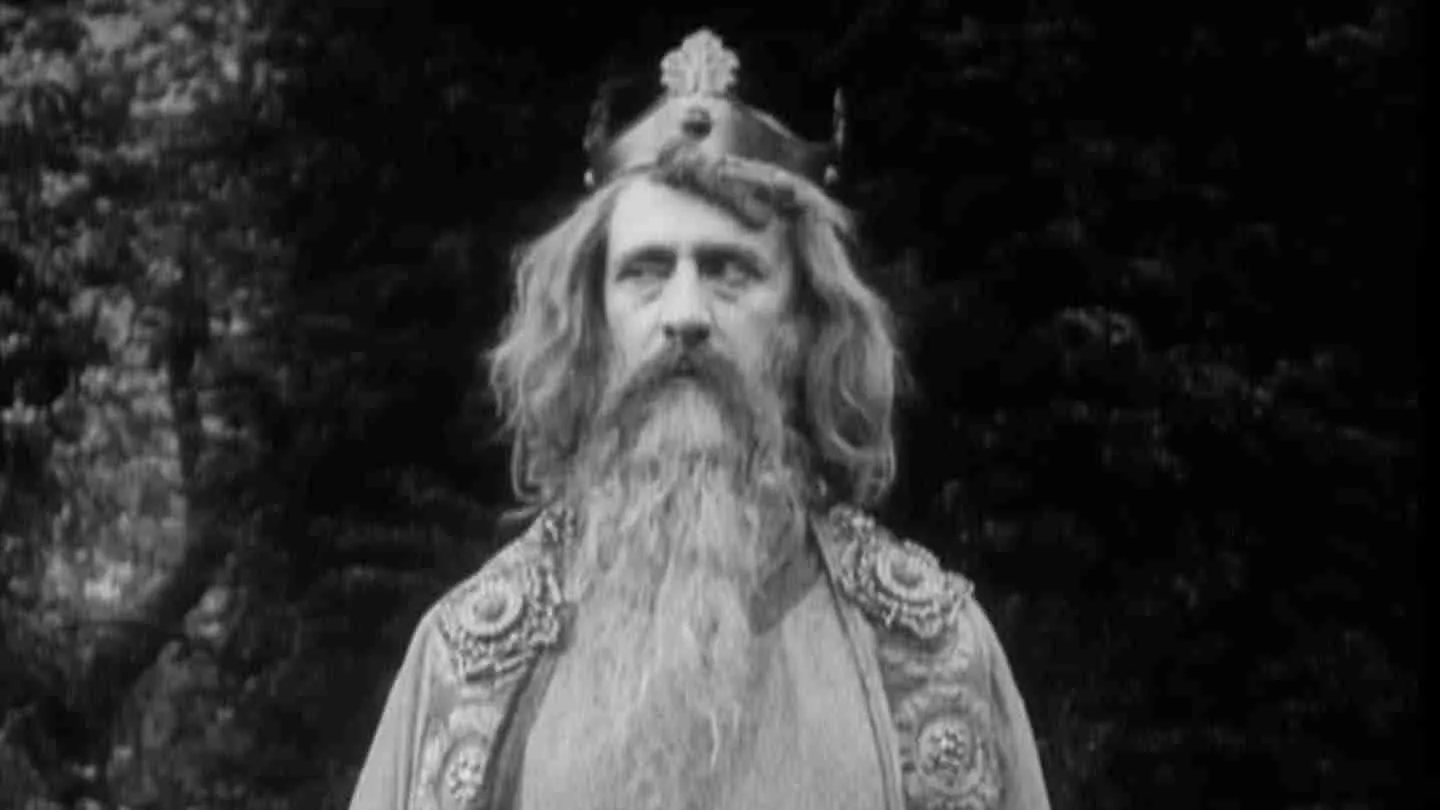
A scene from her 1922 film

In 1919 Buckton spoke at a Leisure of the People Conference in Manchester, describing the way in which everyday people in Glastonbury threw themselves into performance of pageant plays. As a result, the University Settlement organized a May festival in Ancoats, for which Buckton wrote an allegorical play around the figures of Labour, Beauty and Joy.

In 1920 Buckton attended a ceremony in celebration of the foundation stone being laid for a theatre in the grounds of Chalice Well, during which she described the theatre as a "another round table," referring to King Arthur's round table.

In 1922 she led a team who created the 68 minute film Glastonbury past and Present. The film was said to the first about the history of a town.

In 1925 she wrote a series of six radio sketches based on the Arthurian legends, performed by the Cardiff Station Radio Players with music by Warwick Braithwaite. It was the first play specifically written for radio.

In 1938 she received a civil list pension "in recognition of her services to literature and of the services rendered by her father".

== Death ==
Buckton died on 10 December 1944 at the home of a friend in Vicars' Close, Wells, Somerset.

A memorial to Buckton was erected in the Church of St John the Baptist, Glastonbury, by Lionel Smithett Lewis.

== Works ==
- 'Sesame Child Garden and House for Home Training', Child Life, Vol. 1, No. 1 (1899), pp. 32–36
- Through human eyes: poems. Oxford: Daniel Press, 1901. With an introductory poem by Robert Bridges.
- Eager heart: a Christmas mystery-play. London: Methuen, 1904.
- The burden of Engela: a ballad-epic. London: Methuen, 1904.
- The pastor of Wydon fell : a ballad of the North Country. London: E. Mathews, 1905.
- Kings in Babylon: a drama, London: Methuen, 1906.
- Garden of many waters, a masque. London: Mathews, 1907.
- Songs of joy. London: Methuen, 1908.
- 'Order of Service for Saint Bride's Day Gathering', The Forerunner, No. 4 (July 1909)
- Ode to the First Universal Races Congress, Star of the West, Vol. 2, No. 9 (20 August 1911)
- A catechism of life. London: Methuen, 1912.
- The coming of Bride: a pageant play. Glastonbury: Elliot Stock, 1914.
- The meeting in the gate. A Christman interlude. London: E. Stock, 1916.
- Daybreak, and other poems. London: Methuen, 1918.
- The dawn of day: a pageant. London: Blue Triangle, 1919.
- Glastonbury past and Present, 1922 film
