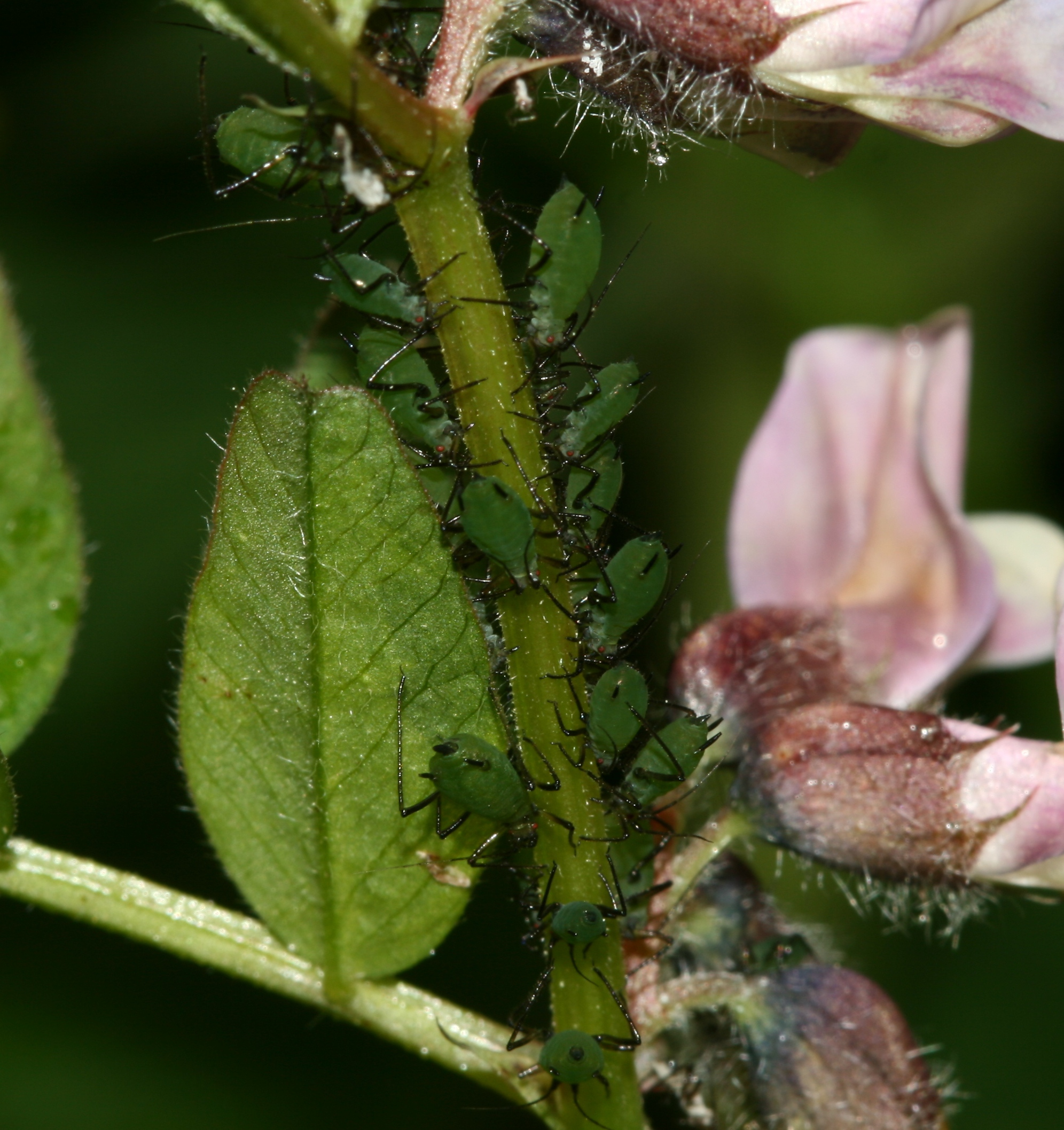
- Megoura viciae

Scientific classification
- Domain: Eukaryota
- Kingdom: Animalia
- Phylum: Arthropoda
- Class: Insecta
- Order: Hemiptera
- Suborder: Sternorrhyncha
- Family: Aphididae
- Subfamily: Aphidinae
- Tribe: Macrosiphini
- Genus: Megoura; Buckton, 1876

Species
- Megoura litoralis F.P. Müller, 1952; Megoura viciae Buckton, 1876

= Megoura =

Genus of true bugs

Megoura is a genus of aphids.
