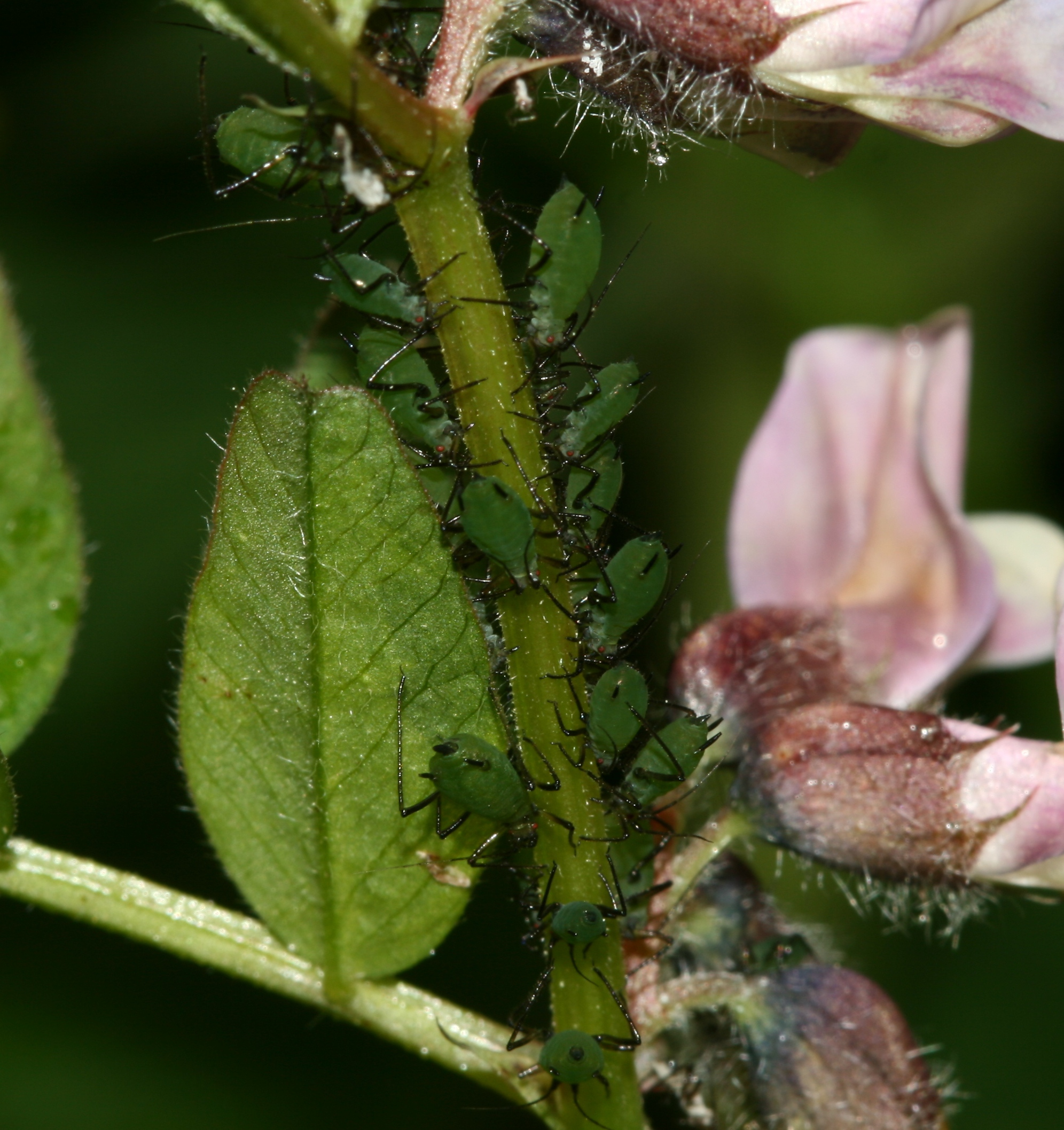

Scientific classification
- Domain: Eukaryota
- Kingdom: Animalia
- Phylum: Arthropoda
- Class: Insecta
- Order: Hemiptera
- Suborder: Sternorrhyncha
- Family: Aphididae
- Genus: Megoura
- Species: M. viciae

Binomial name
- Megoura viciae Buckton, 1876

= Megoura viciae =

Species of true bug

Megoura viciae is a large, green aphid in the family Aphididae native to Europe that feeds on plants in the genus Vicia. They are commonly known as vetch aphids for this reason.

== Taxonomy ==
Megoura viciae was described by English entomologist George Bowdler Buckton in 1876. It is the type species of the genus Megoura.

== Morphology ==
Megoura viciae has a large globular green abdomen with a smaller black prothorax, black cauda, black legs, black antennae and a black head. Towards the rear of the body are large crescent-shaped black sclerites which are in front of the siphunculi. The eyes are red in colour. Dependent on the stage in their lifecycle M. viciae may be winged or wingless.

== Distribution and habitat ==
Megoura viciae is widely present in Europe, from latitudes 64–65° N across Scandinavia, into Denmark and the rest of Europe (including England) and south to the Mediterranean. It also occurs in Ethiopia and has been recorded from North America.

== Host plants ==
Megoura viciae feeds on leguminous plants, primarily vetch, peas and broad beans of the genus Vicia from which M. viciae gets its common name of vetch aphids. Feeding on the host plant causes a leaf gall to form.

== Life cycle ==
Megoura viciae does not move between primary and secondary plants, spending its life cycle on a leguminous host plant. Eggs are laid at the base of the host plant and these hatch in the spring. Winged forms are produced after three generations and these winged aphids then move on to other plants. In the autumn the aphids move on to the seed pods of the host plant. Like most aphids, M. viciae is viviparous.
