= Ralph Whitlock =

British conservationist and journalist (1914–1995)

- Born: Ralph Whitlock; 7 February 1914; Pitton, Wiltshire, England
- Died: 22 October 1995 (aged 81); Salisbury, England
- Spouse: Hilda Pearce (1939–1995) (his death)
- Children: 3

Ralph Whitlock (1914–1995) was a Wiltshire farmer, broadcaster, conservationist, journalist and author of over 100 books.

== Background and education ==
Whitlock was born in Pitton, near Salisbury, Wiltshire six months before the outbreak of the First World War. He was the son of a tenant farmer, the eldest of three children. His family name is noted on the first parish register in Pitton, where his family had been shepherds and farmers since the early 1600s. Whitlock was later to chronicle the history of his native village in The Lost Village, which noted the changes in Pitton from the 1920s to the 1980s. A subsequent volume, The Victorian Village recounted 19th century life there. Educated at Bishop Wordsworth's School, Salisbury, Whitlock had planned to attend university to study history but family circumstances during the Great Depression thwarted any such hopes and he followed his father into farming.

Whitlock's collection of correspondence, diaries and papers is housed at the Wiltshire and Swindon History Centre, Chippenham.

== Author ==
Whitlock began writing for local newspapers in 1930 when he spotted a gap in the market, as the local press did not include coverage of his home village. Two years later was given a column in the Western Gazette which he continued to write for the next 50 years. His local and regional newspaper writing led to further commissions. In 1944, Brian Vesey-Fitzgerald, editor of The Field, invited Whitlock to submit a series of articles on farming. This resulted in his appointment as a farming correspondent, a position he held from 1946 to 1974.

Later regular newspaper commissions included columns in the Daily Telegraph and, latterly, the Guardian Weekly. Collections of his Guardian Weekly articles were published in two books: Letters from an English Village (1988) and Letters from the English Countryside (1992).

Whitlock occasionally wrote under the pseudonyms of Edwin Mould (in The Field) and Madge Reynolds (in a column "Madge Reynolds' Diary" in Farm & Country magazine in the 1960s).

Whitlock's most lasting legacy is his prodigious output of books. His first book, Peasant's Heritage (1947), charted his father's experience at farming; much of the book is a narrative devoted to his father's life as a farm labourer. Many titles were to follow, including books on species, history and folklore, textbooks, and series of children's books. His final title, O Who Will Marry Me? A Book of Country Love, was published in February of the year of his death.

== Broadcaster ==
As a broadcaster, Whitlock was best known for Cowleaze Farm which was part of the long-running Children's Hour radio series slot on the BBC Home Service. Scripted into 20 to 25-minute stories on the life of a farmer, the series ran from 1945 to 1962. In each episode Whitlock would take young listeners on a tour through the farm, accompanied by his dog Towser. In Cowleaze Farm he played himself as Farmer Whitlock, while the part of his wife was mainly played by Phyllis Smale, but also by Vivienne Chatterton and Constance Chapman. Four Cowleaze Farm books were published between 1948 and 1964.

From 1947 to 1949 Whitlock presented a series on the Third Programme and Home Service, titled Bird Song of the Month, a forerunner of Tweet of the Day. Each programme featured recordings of birds by ornithologist Ludwig Koch which could be heard during the month ahead. These programmes and other one-off talks and features presented by Whitlock were produced in Bristol by the founder of the BBC Natural History Unit, Desmond Hawkins.

By the late 1940s Whitlock's minor celebrity status resulted in a foray onto panel game shows such as What Do You Know? and Round Britain Quiz on the radio (1954–5 and 1957), and television's Ask Me Another (1958–60), as well as the early regional TV magazine programme Westward Ho! (1956).

== Farmer and conservationist ==
Whitlock began working in farming after leaving school in 1930, working with his father Edwin 'Ted'. The 30s was a tough decade for small-scale farmers. The Whitlocks shed their sheep, diversifying into vegetables, flowers, and chickens. Despite further expansion into dairy farming, 'the struggle was never ending'. All the income Whitlock earned from writing was ploughed into the farm yet the overdraft grew and, when his father died in 1963, he left nothing.

Four years after his father's death, Whitlock lost in a court battle with Wiltshire County Council and was evicted from the 50 acres he had farmed for 23 years. The land was divided up between neighbouring farms. Despite having a further 140 acres, he decided to retire from farming.

Whitlock's knowledge of farming, forestry and conservation is reflected in his broadcast output which dealt with the then ground-breaking issues of conservation and sustainability. For instance, in 1950, he presented a series of five weekly programmes on the BBC Home Service (now Radio 4), titled The Changing Forest. As two-thirds of Britain's woodlands had been felled to meet the war effort, Whitlock examined the work of the Forestry Commission and its aim to bring five million acres (approx. 2.02m hectares) into productive woodland over the next 50 years. The series covered the forests of Thetford Chase, the New Forest, Kielder, Rheola Forest, and the Lake District.

Whitlock was a founder trustee and honorary warden of the Bentley Wood Charitable Trust near West Dean, Wiltshire, a nature reserve which is a Site of Special Scientific Interest. The 665-hectare site had been acquired in 1983 through a bequest of Lady Colman.

In 1988 Whitlock was awarded a certificate of merit from the Royal Society for the Protection of Birds for his conservation work.

== Methodist Missionary Society ==
Whitlock was also a Methodist lay preacher. On retiring from farming in 1968, he took up the position of agricultural consultant to the Methodist Missionary Society. For the next five years he travelled extensively through East and Central Africa, West Africa, India, Indonesia, Haiti and Belize. His wartime experience of bringing marginal land into cultivation was to stand him in good stead when advising peasant farmers, reclaiming land in Benin and the Gambia, while his dowsing skills secured a reliable water supply for a tribe in northern Ghana. His definitive UK book on water divining was first published by David & Charles in 1982.

Personal insights gained on his travels as agricultural consultant were used in Thinking About Food, a children's text book about producing food for increasing populations, which was part of Lutterworth's World Development Series.

On returning to the UK in 1973, Whitlock retired to Somerset but returned to Wiltshire ten years later, settling in Winterslow, a few miles from Pitton.

== Bibliography ==
=== Non-fiction books ===
- Peasant's heritage (1947)
- Common British birds (1948)
- Wiltshire (Visions of England) (1949)
- The other side of the fence (1950)
- Rare and extinct birds of Britain (1953)
- Wild life on the farm (1953)
- The land first (1954)
- Salisbury Plain (1955)
- Farming as a career (1959)
- A short history of farming in Britain (1965)
- Farming from the road. An illustrated guide (1967)
- The great cattle plague: an account of the foot-and-mouth epidemic of 1967-8 (1968)
- A family and a village (1969)
- Somerset (1975)
- Whitlock's Wessex (1975)
- Exploring rivers, lakes and canals (1976)
- Gentle giants: the past, present and future of the heavy horse (1976)
- The folklore of Wiltshire (1976)
- Wildlife in Wessex: a naturalists' guide (1976)
- Wiltshire (1976)
- Bulls through the ages (1977)
- The folklore of Devon (1977)
- The warrior kings of Saxon England (1977)
- A calendar of country customs (1978)
- Grow your own: the step-by-step guide to successful vegetable and fruit cultivation (1978)
- Growing unusual vegetables (1978)
- Historic forests of England (1979)
- In search of lost gods: a guide to British folklore (1979)
- The shaping of the countryside (1979)
- Rare breeds: the vulnerable survivors (1980)
- Royal farmers (1980)
- Birds at risk: a comprehensive world-survey of threatened species (1981)
- Bird watch in an English village (1982)
- Dorset Farming (1982)
- The countryside: random gleanings (1982)
- Water divining and other dowsing: a practical guide (1982)
- Here be dragons (1983)
- The English farm (1983)
- Three-score-years-and-ten (1984)
- The oak (1985)
- Roots in the soil: an adventure in agriculture (1987)
- Letters from an English village (1988)
- The lost village: rural life between the wars (1988)
- A Victorian village (1990)
- The secret lane (1990)
- Letters from the English countryside (1992)
- Wiltshire folklore and legends (1992)
- March winds and April showers: country weather lore (1993)
- O who will marry me? a book of country love (1995)

=== Pseudonym of Edwin Mould ===
- Round Roundbarrow Farm (1946)

=== Pseudonym of Madge Reynolds ===
- The farmer's wife (1960)

=== Co-author with Edgar Julian Sowe ===
- Village life and work (1944)

=== Children's books ===
- Cowleaze Farm (1948)
- Harvest at Cowleaze (1951)
- Cowleaze Farm in winter (1952)
- A year on Cowleaze Farm (1964)
- Deer (Young naturalist books) (1974)
- Otters (Young naturalist books) (1974)
- Project Earth: Feast or Famine? (1974)
- Rabbits and hares (Young naturalist books) (1974)
- Rats and mice (Young naturalist books) (1974)
- Squirrels (Young naturalist books) (1974)
- My world of the past (1975)
- Spiders (Young naturalist books) (1975)
- Everyday life of the Maya (1976)
- Chimpanzees (Animals of the World) (1977)
- Penguins (Animals of the World) (1977)
- Pond life (Young naturalist books) (1978)
- Thinking about rural development (1978)
- A closer look at butterflies and moths (1978)
- Dragonflies (Observing Nature) (1979)
- Ducks (Young naturalist books) (1979)
- Eels (Young naturalist books) (1979)
- Wild cats (Young naturalist books) (1979)
- Grasshoppers and Crickets (Observing nature) (1980)
- Thinking about food (1980)
- Clara's Country Year (1981)
- Eating and being eaten (World of nature) (1981)
- Hyenas and jackals (Young naturalist books) (1981)
- Llamas and yaks (Animals of the World) (1981)
- Dairy cows (Farm animals) (1982)
- Pigs (Farm animals) (1982)
- Poultry (Farm animals) (1982)
- Sheep (Farm animals) (1982)
- Farming in history (Picture history) (1983)
- Insects (Colour library) (1983)
- Working on a farm (People at Work) (1983)
- Harvest and thanksgiving (festivals) (1984)
- Landscape in history (Picture history) (1984)
- Weather (My First Library) (1985)
- In the park (Use your eyes) (1986)
- In the soil (Use your eyes) (1986)
- In the town (Use your eyes) (1986)
- The seasons: Summer (1986)
- Exploring buildings (1987)
- Exploring farming (Exploring the Past) (1987)
- Exploring people (Exploring the Past) (1987)
- The seasons: Autumn (1987)
- The seasons: Winter (1987)

=== Co-author with Peggy Heeks ===
Down on the Farm series:

- Potatoes on the farm (1984)
- Tractors on the farm (1984)
- Wheat on the farm (1984)
- Buildings on the farm (1984)
- Spring on the farm (1985)
- Summer on the farm (1985)
- Autumn on the farm (1985)
- Winter on the farm (1985)
