= Farley, Wiltshire =

Village in Wiltshire, England

Coordinates: 51.063°N 1.680°W

Farley
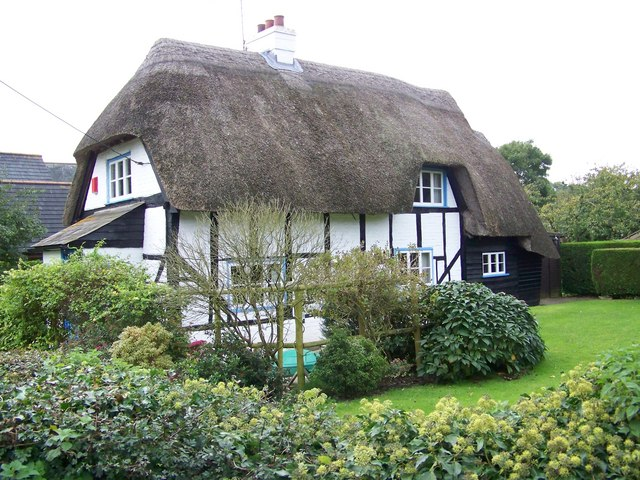
- Springfield Cottage, Farley

- Location within Wiltshire
- OS grid reference: SU225293
- Civil parish: Pitton and Farley
- Unitary authority: Wiltshire
- Ceremonial county: Wiltshire
- Region: South West
- Country: England
- Sovereign state: United Kingdom
- Post town: Salisbury
- Postcode district: SP5
- Dialling code: 01722
- Police: Wiltshire
- Fire: Dorset and Wiltshire
- Ambulance: South Western
- UK Parliament: Salisbury
- Website: Parish Council

Farley is a village in southeast Wiltshire, England, about 5 miles (8.0 km) east of Salisbury.

== Geography ==
Farley is one of the Dun Valley villages, together with East Grimstead, West Dean and Pitton. Streams which form the River Dun rise to the west and south of Farley, and the river flows east into Hampshire.

== Local government ==
The civil parish of Pitton and Farley encompasses the villages of Pitton and Farley. The parish elects a parish council. It is in the area of Wiltshire Council unitary authority, which is responsible for all significant local government functions.

== Notable buildings ==
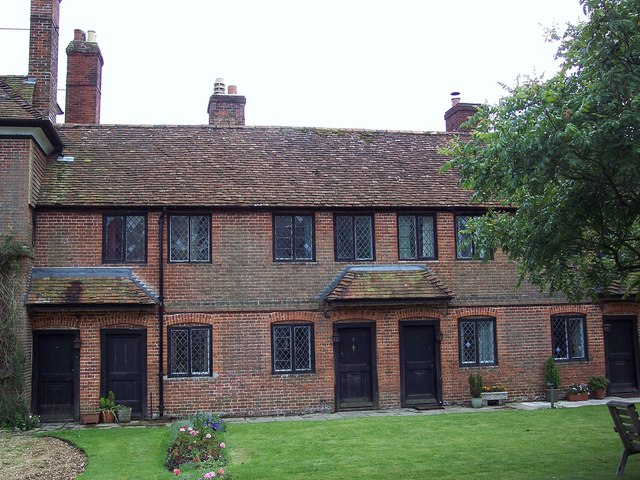
Farley Hospital, the almshouse built by Sir Stephen Fox

A block of 12 dwellings for poor elderly persons, with accommodation for a warden and containing a schoolroom, was built for Sir Stephen Fox in 1681 by Alexander Fort. (Sir Stephen also founded the Royal Hospital Chelsea, London, which was designed and built by Christopher Wren; Fort was Wren's master mason.) The building, also known as Fox's Hospital, is Grade I listed. It continues to operate as a charity.

A National School was built in 1867 immediately east of the church, with space for 80 pupils. It gained voluntary aided status in 1955, when there were 26 attending. Numbers rose in the 1980s and 1990s but then fell, and the school closed in August 2005.

== Parish church ==
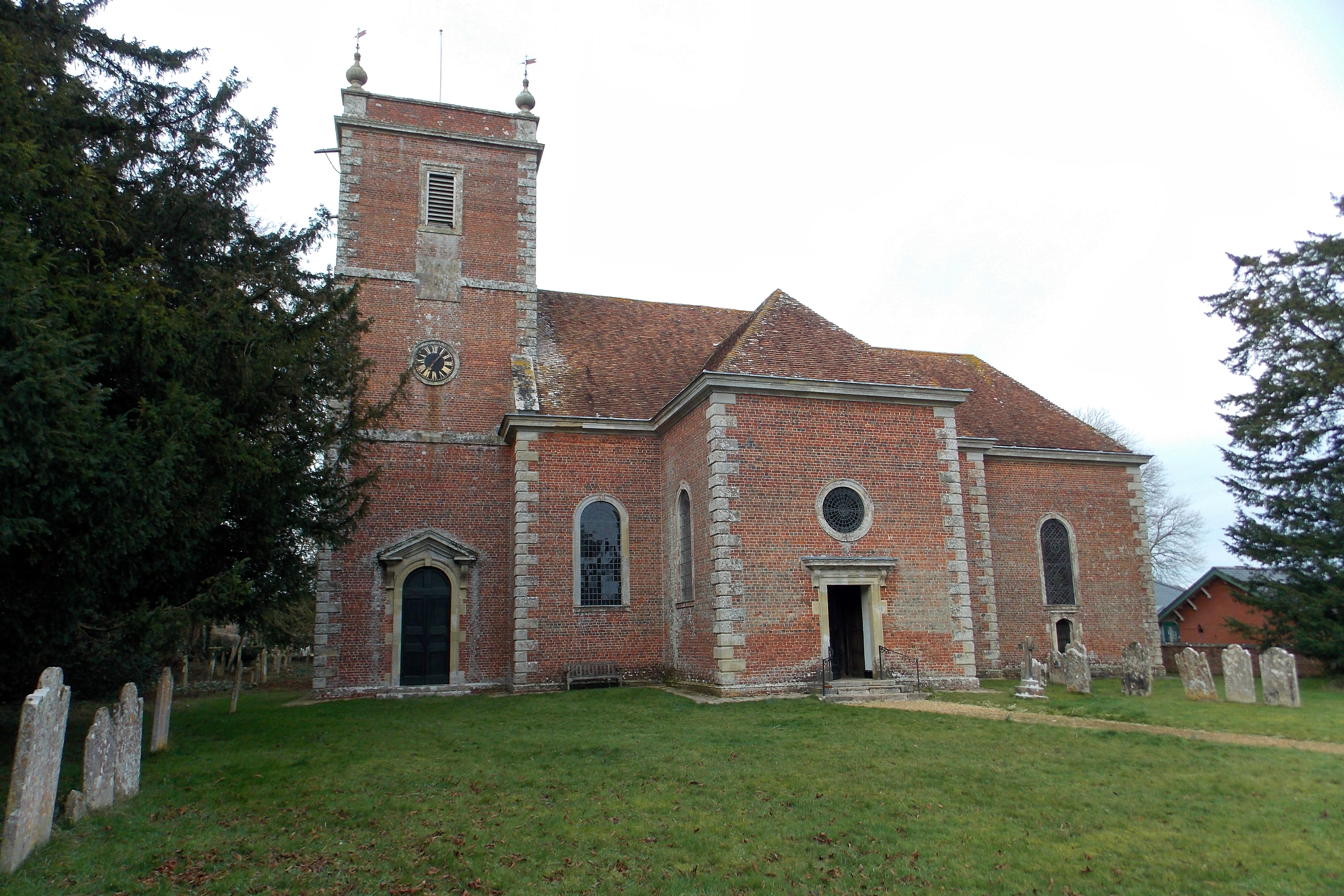
All Saints' Church

The Anglican Church of All Saints was built in 1690 by Sir Stephen Fox (1627–1716) probably to the design of Alexander Fort, opposite the almshouses also built by him. It is built in red brick, in English bond, with stone dressings. The font is original. The church was restored in 1875 by Ewan Christian and designated as Grade I listed in 1960.

The churches at Farley and Pitton were chapelries of St Mary's at Alderbury until 1874, when the parish of Farley with Pitton was established, with Farley church as the parish church. Today the parish is one of the ten covered by the Clarendon team ministry.

== Amenities ==
The village has a nursery school and a pub, the Hook and Glove. Farley Cricket Club was founded around 1866 and plays in the Hampshire Cricket League.

Blackmoor Copse, a biological Site of Special Scientific Interest which is managed as a nature reserve by the Wiltshire Wildlife Trust, lies east of the village.

== Notable people ==
- Sir Stephen Fox (1627–1716), politician and Paymaster of the Forces, born at Farley
- Sir Hugh Norman-Walker (1916–1985), colonial official and Colonial Secretary of Hong Kong, retired to Farley
