= Museum of Childhood (Edinburgh) =

Museum in City of Edinburgh, Scotland

Coordinates: 55.9504°N 3.1856°W

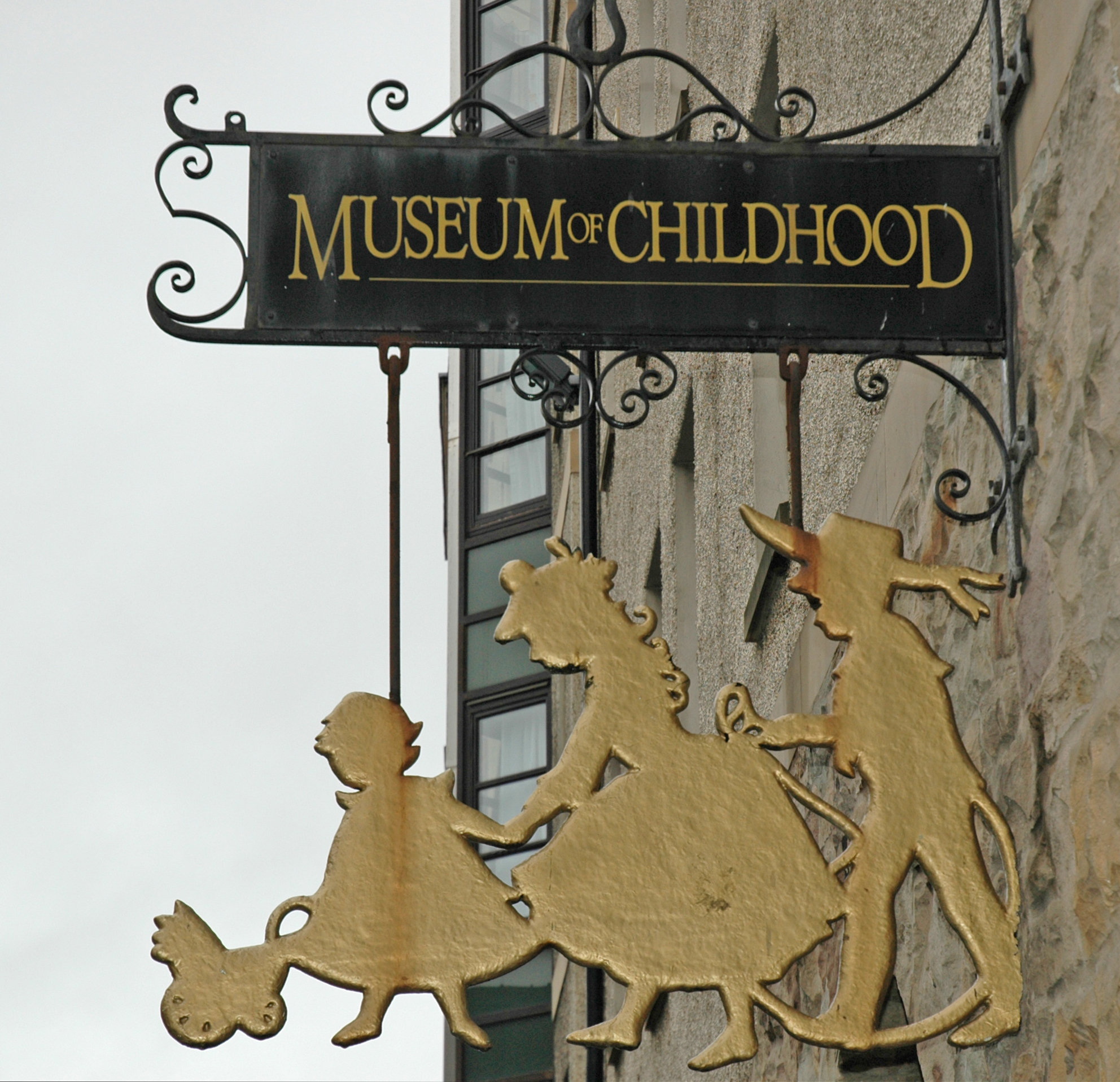

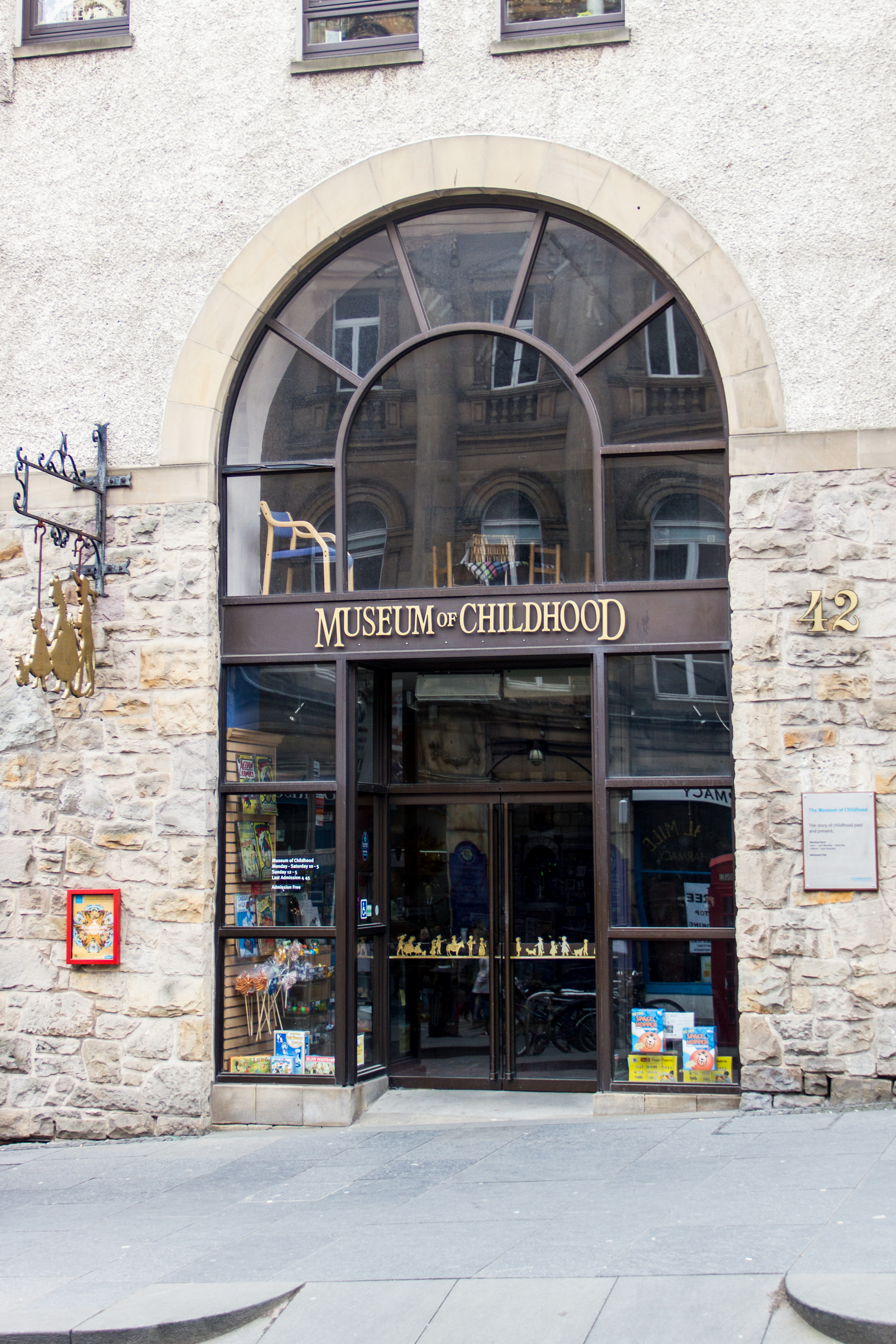
- Established: 1955
- Location: Royal Mile, Edinburgh, Scotland
- Type: Toy
- Collection size: 60,000
- Visitors: 225,000 (2017)
- Founder: Patrick Murray
- Owner: City of Edinburgh Council
- Website: Official website

The Museum of Childhood is a museum that houses a collection of children's toys and playthings, situated on the Royal Mile, in Edinburgh, Scotland. It is the first museum in the world to specialise in the history of childhood. Admission to the museum is free. It is run and owned by City of Edinburgh Council.

== History ==
The collection was originally the work of Patrick Murray (1908–1981), an Edinburgh Councillor and passionate collector of toys and childhood memorabilia. The museum first opened to the public in 1955. In 1957, it moved to its present home on Edinburgh's Royal Mile, in what was formerly the Salvation Army's hall. In 1986, the museum expanded into neighbouring properties to expand the floor and display space.

In 2017, the museum underwent a major refurbishment, including the installation of new display cabinets and lighting for exhibits. The refurbishment also saw the installation of a new digital photo gallery, which offers a look at the changing way children grew up across the 20th century. In 2017, it was estimated that the museum had around 225,000 visitors per year.

== Collection ==
The museum's collection includes around 60,000 objects, from the 18th to the 21st century. Highlights include a teddy bear brought to the UK by a child on the Kindertransport, a dollhouse with working lighting and plumbing systems, a Queen Anne doll from 1740, and a copy of handmade booklet The Life History of a Slum Child by Lileen Hardy. The collection also includes one of the Scottish Government's baby boxes, a maternity package offered to all new parents in Scotland.

The museum has a number of interactive spaces to encourage play amongst younger visitors.

== Gallery ==
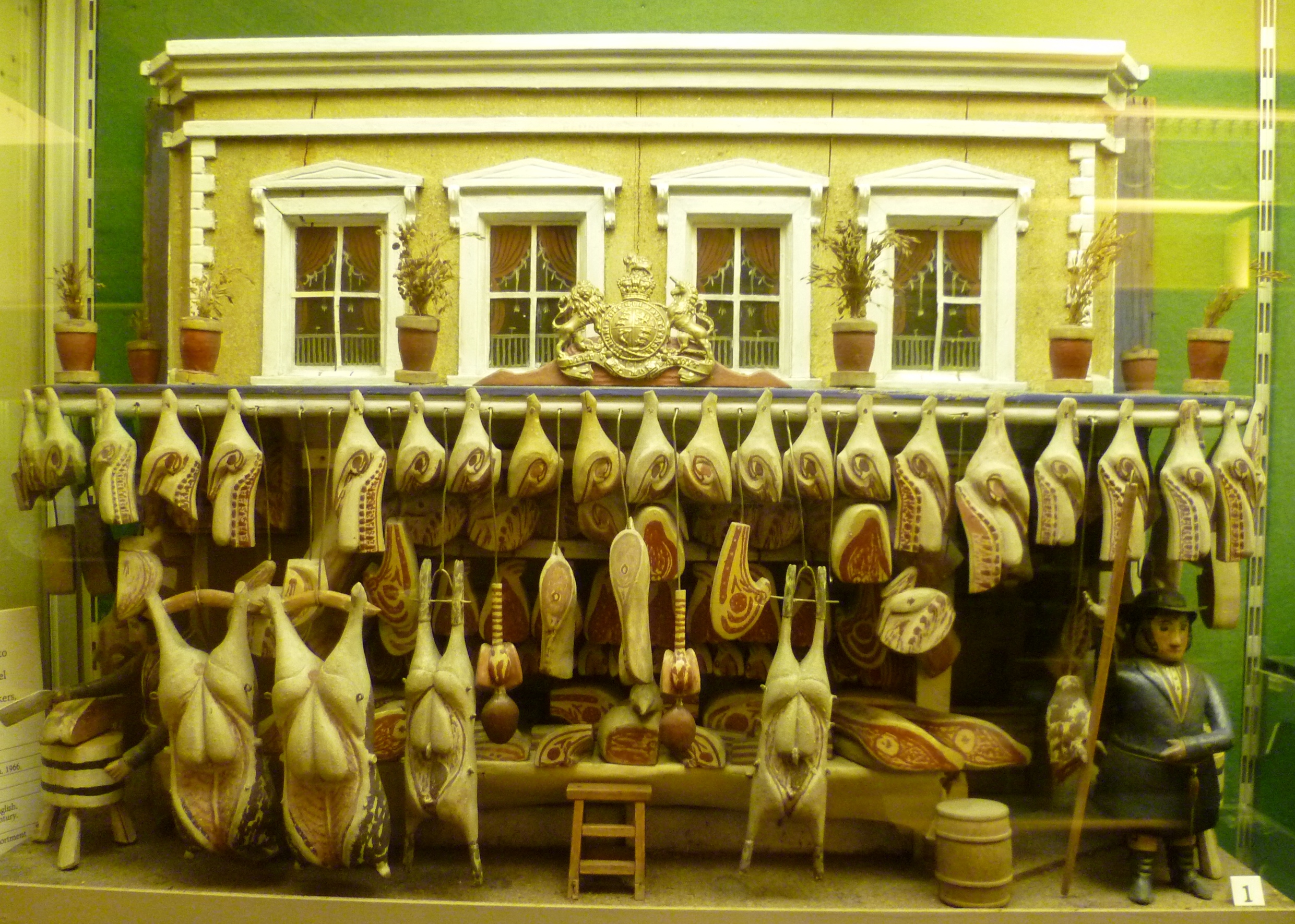
Victorian butcher's shop, 1880s

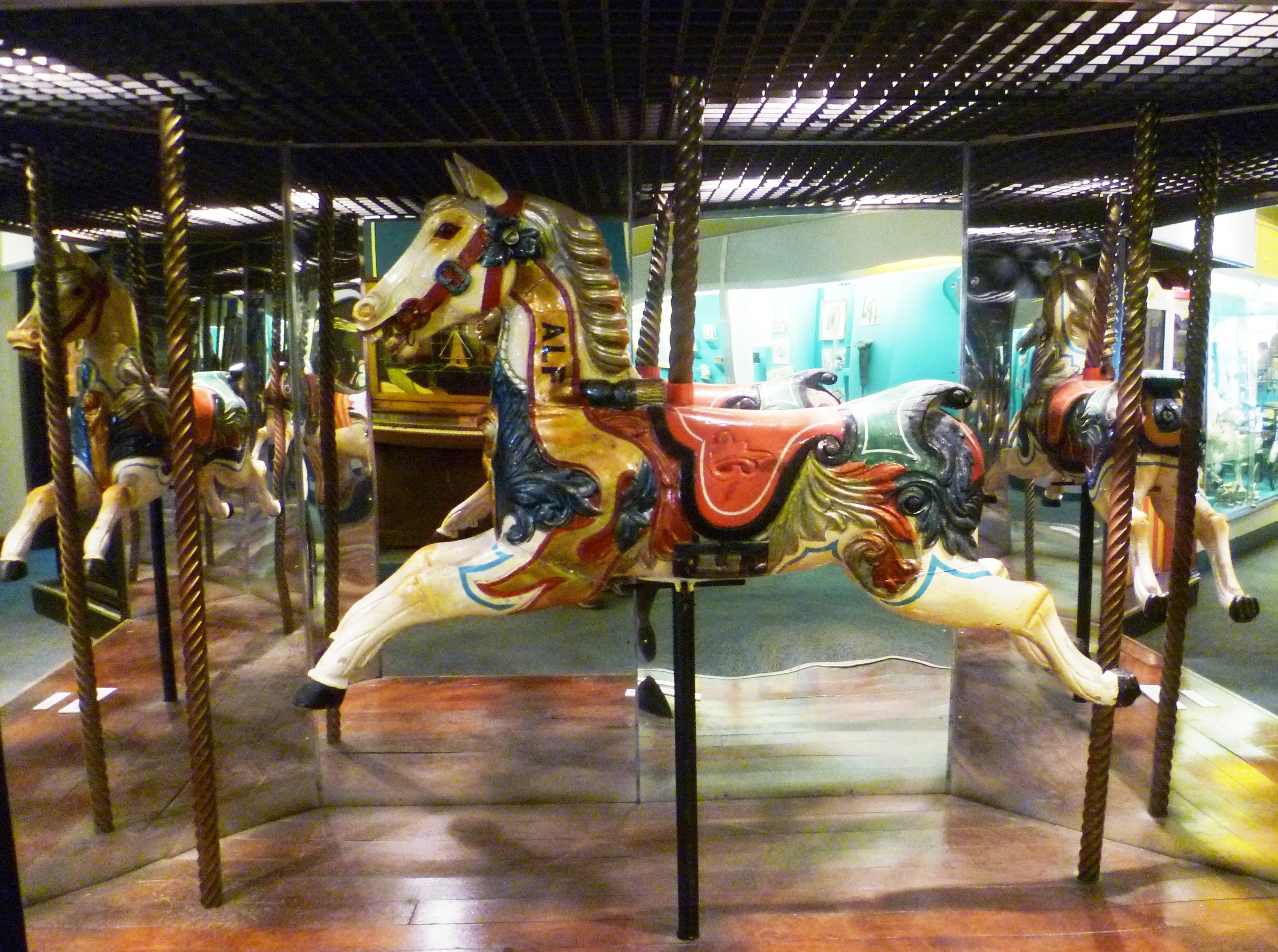
Funfair Galloper Horse, c.1902

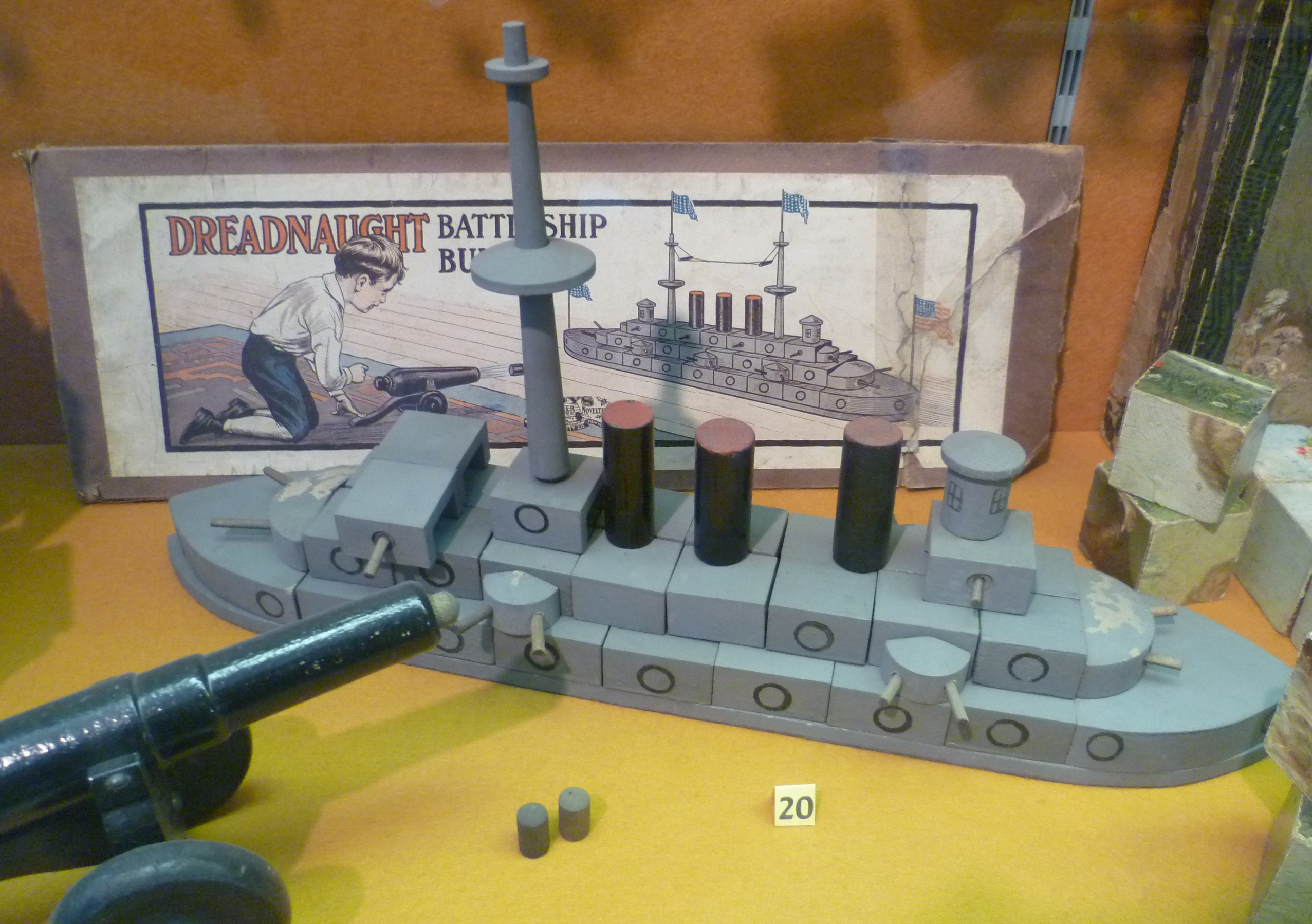
A pre-1914 battleship toy modelled on H.M.S. Dreadnought

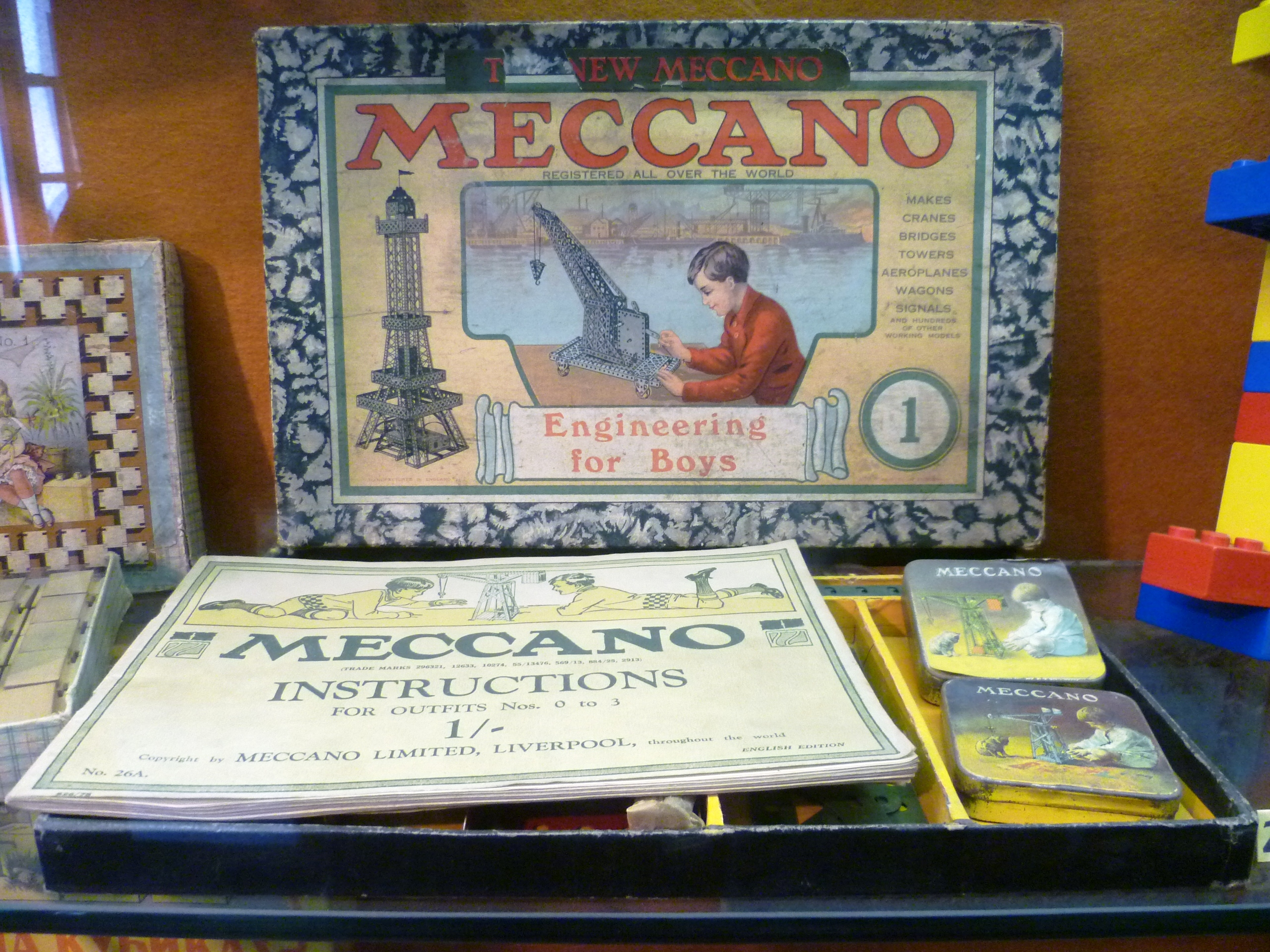
'Meccano' construction set

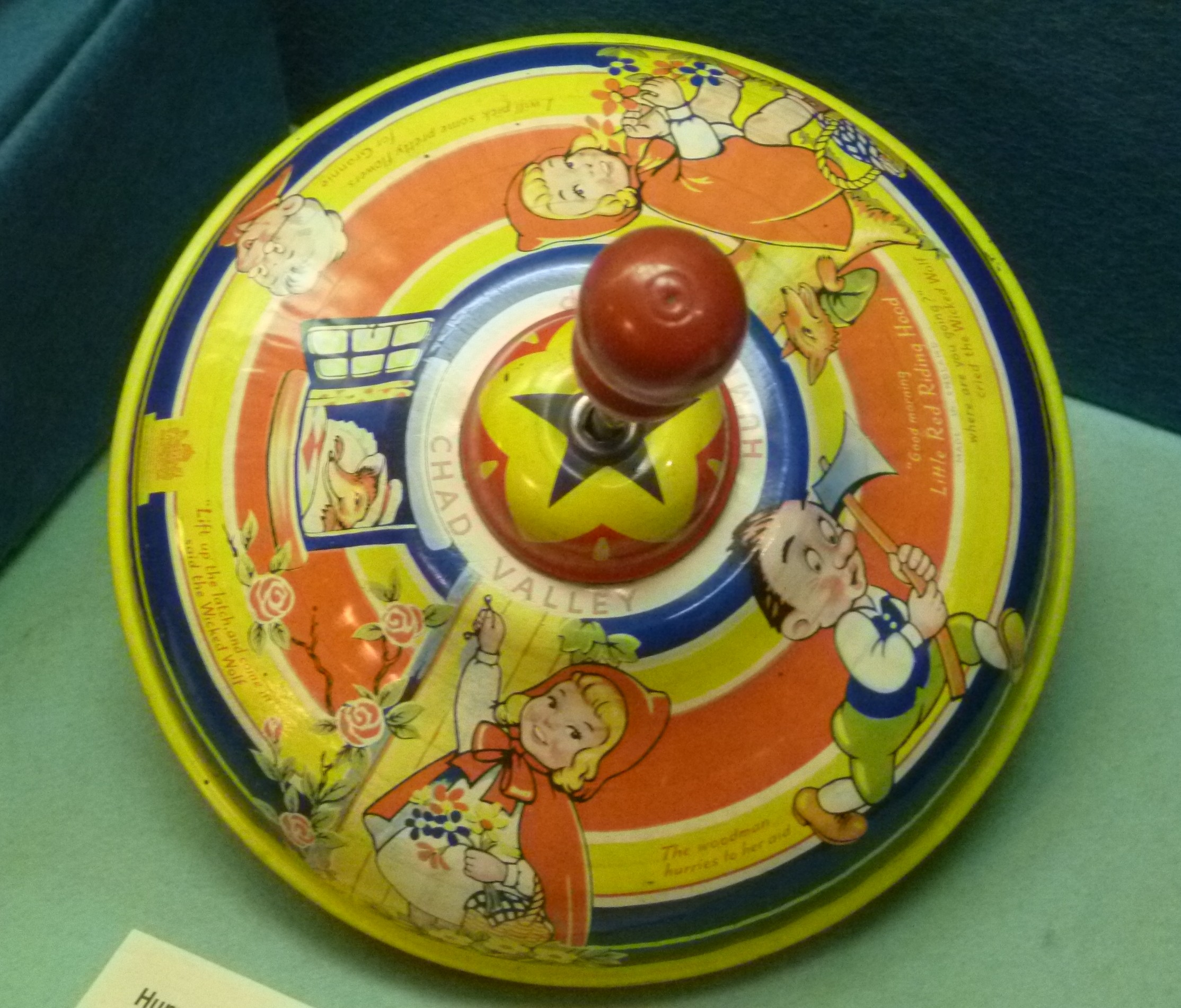
Child's metal spinning top from the 1950s

== See also ==
- Trinity Apse and Brass Rubbing Centre, Chalmers Close
- Museum of Childhood, for similarly named museums
