= Alderbury =

Village in Wiltshire, England

Coordinates: 51.043°N 1.732°W

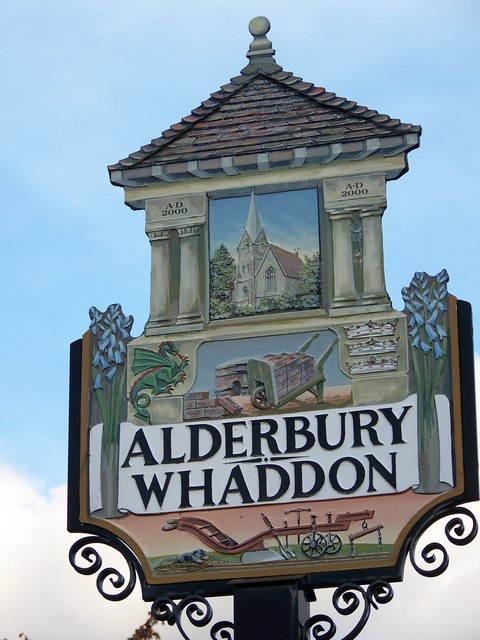

- Location within Wiltshire
- Population: 2,223 (in 2011)
- OS grid reference: SU189271
- Civil parish: Alderbury
- Unitary authority: Wiltshire
- Ceremonial county: Wiltshire
- Region: South West
- Country: England
- Sovereign state: United Kingdom
- Post town: Salisbury
- Postcode district: SP5
- Dialling code: 01722
- Police: Wiltshire
- Fire: Dorset and Wiltshire
- Ambulance: South Western
- UK Parliament: Salisbury
- Website: Parish Council

Alderbury is a village and civil parish in Wiltshire, England, in the south of the county around 3 miles (5 km) southeast of Salisbury.

The parish includes the village of Whaddon, which is adjacent to Alderbury, and the hamlet of Shute End. The River Avon forms the western boundary of the parish. The villages are on the Salisbury-Southampton road which became the A36 primary route; a bypass was opened in 1978, taking the A36 to the east of the villages.

== History ==
The name Alderbury derives from the Old English Aethelwaruburh meaning 'Aethelwaru's fortification'.

The Domesday survey in 1086 recorded a settlement with 13 households at Alwarberie or Alwaresberie. Between 1110 and 1122, Alderbury church and its dependent chapels at Ivychurch (just north of the present Alderbury village), Whaddon and Farley were granted by Henry I to the Bishop of Salisbury.

Ivychurch Priory was founded in the late 12th century by King Stephen, on the site of the Ivychurch chapel. After the dissolution, lessees of the bishop included the Earls of Pembroke (1551–1647) and the Earls of Radnor (1757–1801). Longford Castle, on the opposite bank of the Avon, has been the Radnor seat since 1717.

The ancient Alderbury parish had two detached areas at Farley and Pitton, adjacent to each other but around 3 miles (5 km) to the northeast of Alderbury and separated from it by Clarendon Park. At some point before the 1881 census they were made a separate civil parish, Pitton and Farley.

The population of the parish reached a peak of around 700 in the middle of the 19th century, and was little changed until after the Second World War. The 1951 census recorded 1,029 and by 2001 numbers had more than doubled to 2,143.

Between 1961 and 1991, the village was the location of a Royal Observer Corps monitoring bunker, to be used in the event of a nuclear attack. It remains mostly intact and in June 2000, it was re-equipped for three days to film a documentary on the ROC.

== Religious sites ==
A church at Alderbury was recorded in the 1086 Domesday Book. A new and larger parish church of St Mary was erected on the site of a medieval church in 1857–58 to designs by S.S. Teulon, at the expense of Lord Radnor of Longford Castle, Sir Frederick Hervey-Bathurst of Clarendon Park and George Fort of Alderbury House.

The Grade II listed church has a northwest tower and octagonal spire, and is built in random flint with Bath stone dressings, some of the materials being recovered from the earlier church. Two tablet monuments were retained from the previous church, while tombstones from the churchyard were used to pave the floor. There is stained glass by Henry Holiday; Clayton and Bell; Heaton, Butler and Bayne; and William Morris. In 1960, wrought iron panels designed by Sir George Gilbert Scott for an 1870 screen at Salisbury Cathedral were used to make the communion rail.

The parish had chapelries at Farley and Pitton until 1874, when the parish of Farley with Pitton was created. From 1964 the vicar was appointed as rector of West Grimstead, and the two benefices were united in 1971 although the parishes remained distinct. Today, Alderbury parish is part of the Clarendon group, alongside the West Grimstead, Farley and Pitton churches and five others.

Although the previous church at this site (demolished in 1857) is well covered in histories of the region, there has been a place of worship here for centuries. There is mention of one in a 1341 document, and a 15th-century document discusses St John of Alwardburie. The church on this site was called St Mary's by 1754, "a plain building with a wooden turret, perpendicular windows in the chancel and a post-Restoration south porch with a belfry" according to Wiltshire Council. That was the building that was demolished in 1857.

There was a church or chapel at Whaddon in the 12th to 14th centuries, which fell into disuse sometime before 1536.

Not far from Alderbury, Ivychurch Priory was an Augustinian monastery established in the 12th century and dissolved in 1536. According to Historic England, "all that remains is a cylindrical pier with multi-scalloped capital and part of the double-chamfered arch with a respond to the west with a half-pier and capital; this is attached to the west wall of the church which retains one buttress".

A Wesleyan Methodist chapel was built at Alderbury in 1825 and demolished in 1970. A Primitive Methodist chapel built at Whaddon in 1884 became a Roman Catholic chapel in 1990.

== Notable buildings ==
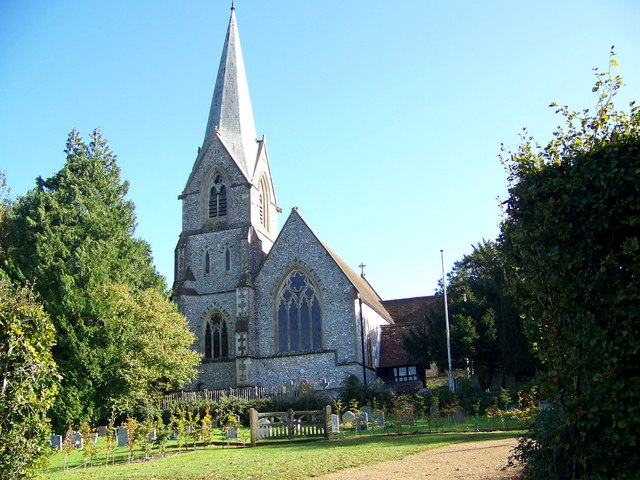
The Church of St Mary the Virgin

Alderbury House is a Grade II* listed country house from the late 18th century, near St Mary's church, on a rise above the Avon meadows. Described as one of Wiltshire's most elegant Georgian country houses when it was offered for sale in 2020 with 33 acres for around £5 million, it is now believed to have been designed by Benjamin Henry Latrobe, known for his work on The White House in Washington DC. The Historic England listing, added in 1960, stated that the architect was James Wyatt, but it was "misattributed" according to Michael Fazio in The Domestic Architecture of Benjamin Henry Latrobe.

A water trough in limestone under a tiled roof was erected in 1902 on the village green, to commemorate the coronation of Edward VII and in appreciation of the Earl of Radnor for providing a water supply to the village. The structure re-uses four double capitals from the remains of Ivychurch Priory.

At Shute End, just inside Clarendon parish, St Marie's Grange was built in 1835 by architect Augustus Pugin for his own occupation, but enlarged in 1841 after he had left. Pevsner describes the "romantic dream come true" in some detail. The house is Grade I listed.

== Workhouses ==
The Alderbury Poor Law Union built workhouses to serve the Salisbury area. One workhouse was built on Coombe Road in 1836. Another was built near the Odstock road in 1878 and later had a chapel added. The county council took over the site, renamed Meyrick Close, in the 1970s as a social services facility.

== Notable people ==
In the 16th century, Ivychurch Priory was converted into a house by Henry Herbert, 2nd Earl of Pembroke. Residents included Sir George Penruddock (died 1581, politician); Mary Herbert, Countess of Pembroke (1561–1621, literary figure and patroness); and John Dove (died 1664/5, politician).

Tennis player Violet Millicent Pinckney (1871–1955) was born at Alderbury, as was Anglo-Scottish educator and social reformer Lileen Hardy.

== Canal and railways ==
The Salisbury and Southampton Canal was built from Kimbridge (where it joined the Andover Canal) to Alderbury but was never completed as far as Salisbury; construction stopped at Tunnel Hill, near Alderbury House. The canal was opened in 1802 or 1803 and closed in 1806.

The Bishopstoke-Romsey-Salisbury section of the London and South Western Railway was built north of Alderbury and Whaddon, turning west into the Dean valley towards Dean station at West Dean. Opened in 1847, it continues in use as part of the Wessex Main Line between Bristol and Southampton. In 1866 the Salisbury and Dorset Junction Railway was built from a junction with the earlier railway near Alderbury, skirting Whaddon and turning south towards Downton and the south coast. This line was closed in 1964 and the track was lifted.

== Amenities ==
Alderbury has a primary school, Alderbury & West Grimstead CofE (VA) Primary School (commonly abbreviated as "AWGS"), which opened in 1993 on a new site to replace a building which had been used as a school since 1838.

Whaddon has a post office / newsagent, and there is a local shop in Alderbury. There is one pub, the Green Dragon at Alderbury. A social club is next to the village hall in the grounds of the recreation field.
