= Blackmoor Copse =

Woodland in England

Coordinates: 51.0617°N 1.6675°W

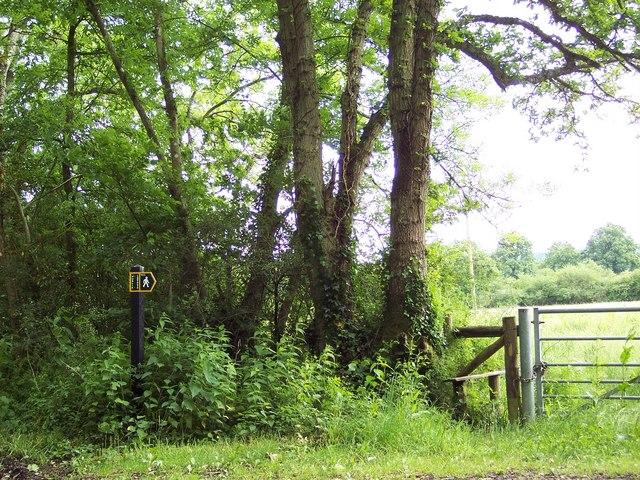
Footpath from Blackmoor Copse to Farley

Blackmoor Copse (grid reference SU234292) is a woodland in southeast Wiltshire, England, managed as a nature reserve by the Wiltshire Wildlife Trust. The copse lies within Pitton and Farley parish, about 5 1/2 miles (9 km) east of Salisbury.

A 31.3-hectare (77-acre) area of the wood was notified as a biological Site of Special Scientific Interest in 1971.

The site is adjacent to another, larger, woodland SSSI, Bentley Wood.
