= Bentley Wood =

Large contiguous area of woodland in Wiltshire, England

Coordinates: 51.064°N 1.645°W

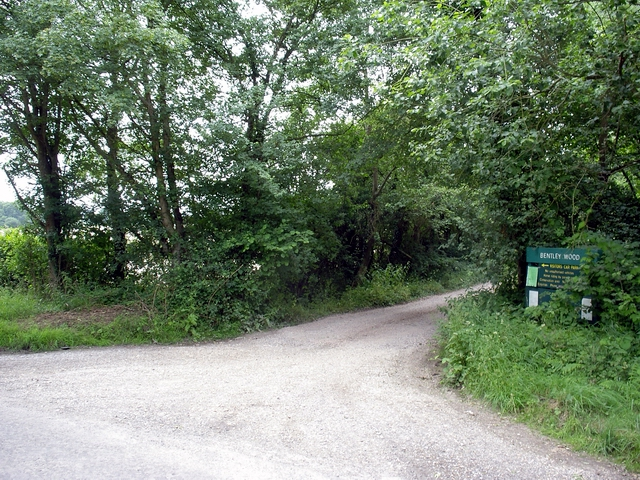
Entrance to Bentley Wood

Bentley Wood (grid reference SU250295), together with the adjacent Blackmoor Copse, form one of the largest contiguous areas of woodland in Wiltshire, England. The wood is about 6 miles (10 km) east of Salisbury, north of the village of West Dean, and is largely within West Dean parish.

An area of 665 hectares of the wood was notified as a biological Site of Special Scientific Interest in 1985. The site is important for butterflies, with species present including purple emperor, white admiral and pearl-bordered fritillary.

== World War II ==
In the build up to D-Day in the spring of 1944, Bentley Wood was used as accommodation for United States troops. The headquarters were in Norman Court mansion, West Tytherley, to the east of the wood. NCOs and other ranks were encamped in Nissen huts erected within the wood. The facilities included a hospital in an extended Nissen hut.

Most of the wood north of Livery Track was used. Some areas of the wood were laid to gravel to facilitate heavy vehicles, and Livery Track was widened and laid with macadam. A modest number of trees were felled to provide space.

Following the end of the war, the wood was used temporarily to store vehicles and other equipment returning from Europe.

== Recent history ==
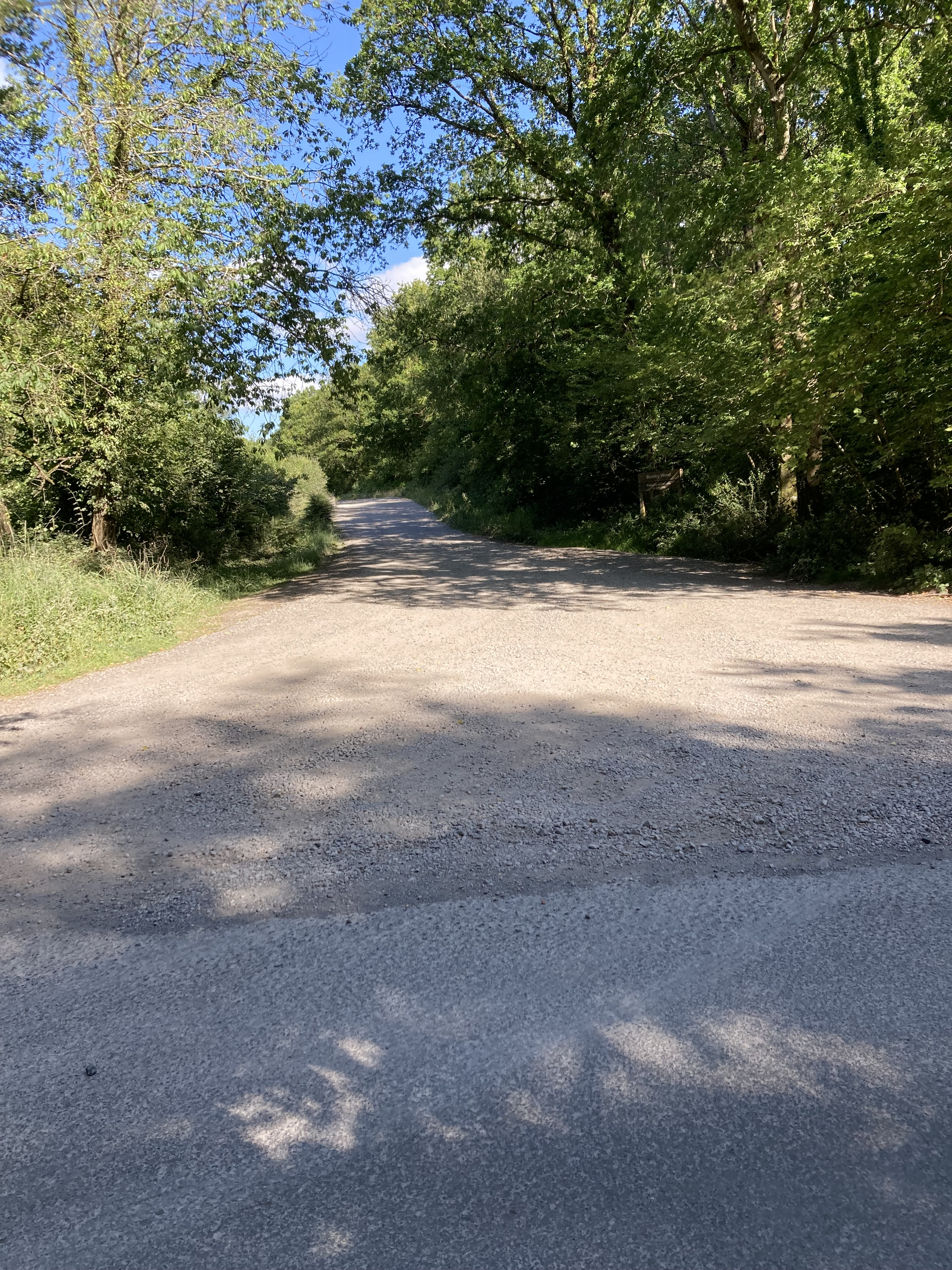
Farley entrance to the wood

In 1950 Bentley Wood was acquired by the Forestry Commission, which undertook a large replanting programme to fill in the spaces that had been cleared to accommodate military facilities in the WWII period. In 1983 the UK Government decided to sell much of the woodland owned by the Forestry Commission, including Bentley Wood. A local resident, Lady Ann Colman, widow of Sir Nigel Colman, formed a trust with the purpose of purchasing Bentley Wood for the public, which was achieved shortly before her death in 1984.

The Bentley Wood Charitable Trust that she had formed was guided initially by Ralph Whitlock, a local farmer, conservationist and broadcaster. Among his achievements associated with the development of the wood was the formation of The Friends of Bentley Wood, a group of local people whose purpose is to protect the wood as a nature reserve and develop it for the access and enjoyment of the public.
