= Lileen Hardy =

British educator and social reformer (1872–1947)

- Born: 1872; Alderbury, Wiltshire, England
- Died: 1947 (aged 74–75)
- Occupations: educator, social reformer and the founder of a kindergarten in Edinburgh

Lileen Hardy (1872–1947) was an Anglo-Scottish educator, social reformer and the founder of a kindergarten for the children of Edinburgh’s Canongate slums.

== Biography ==
Hardy was born in Alderbury, Wiltshire, in 1872, and her father was a pharmacist.

She enrolled in the Sesame Garden and House for Home Life Training in St John's Wood, which was founded by Annet Schepel in 1899, taught in line with the child-centred pedagogical theories of German educator Friedrich Fröbel and was modelled on Pestalozzi-Froebel Haus in Germany. Hardy attended in the first year the school opened, and was one of the oldest students.

After graduating, by 1901 Hardy had moved to Edinburgh where she became acquainted with social reformers of the Secular Positivist group, including Alexander Barbour, Patrick Geddes, Edith Oliphant and Alexander Whyte, as well as Canon Albert Ernest Laurie of the Episcopal Church of Old St Paul's (OSP).

In 1906, Hardy opened the St Saviour’s Child Garden in the densely packed slums of Canongate in Edinburgh’s Old Town. It was the second free nursery provided for the poor children in Edinburgh and was open until 1977.

To fundraise for the institution, Hardy published a handmade booklet called The Life History of a Slum Child. She wrote about the mother's of the children she taught, stating that "with the cramped house space, burdened restricted lives and big families it is hardly to be expected that they will have energy, insight, time and patience to raise them well." A copy of the booklet is held in the collection of the Museum of Childhood in Edinburgh.

Hardy also published the Diary of a Free Kindergarten in 1912, which was introduced by the American educator Kate Douglas Wiggin. The book covered the period from November 1906 to April 1912, recounted the daily activities at St Saviour’s Child Garden and shared Hardy's concerns for the slum children she taught.

Due to ill health, Hardy retired in 1928 and was succeeded by Ursula Herdman. She died in 1947.

== Legacy ==
The Lileen Hardy Primary School is named after Hardy.

For International Women's Day in 2021, Hardy was among the women selected by curators at Museums and Galleries Edinburgh who were celebrated in a series of digital and in person events. Hardy was discussed in a lecture by Jane Read and Jane Whinnett for the Froebel Trust on International Women's Day in 2022.
