= Annet Schepel =

Dutch educator (1844–1931)

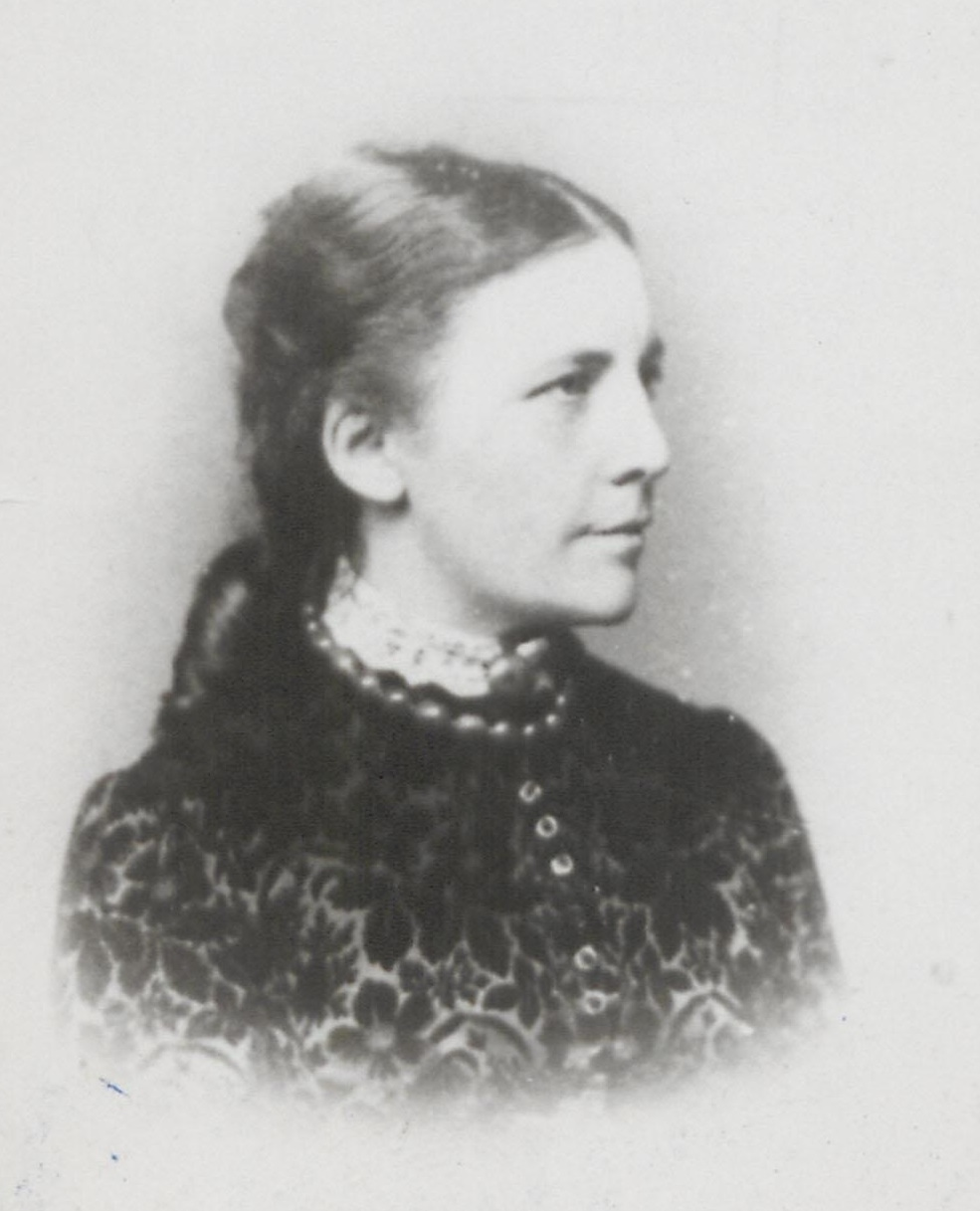
- Born: Annette Hamminck Schepel; 26 December 1844; The Hague, South Holland, Netherlands
- Died: 3 March 1931 (aged 86); Wells, Somerset, United Kingdom
- Occupations: Educator; head teacher
- Employer: Pestalozzi-Fröbel House
- Known for: Head teacher of Pestalozzi-Fröbel House
- Partner: Alice Buckton
- Relatives: Multatuli (brother-in-law)

Annet Hamminick Schepel (26 December 1844–3 March 1931) was a Dutch educator and head teacher of the Pestalozzi-Fröbel House. Schepel emigrated from Berlin to the United Kingdom and established a Froebelian institution in London.

== Early life ==
Schepel was born on 26 December 1844 in The Hague, to Johannes Christiaan Pieter Hamminck Schepel (1808–1870), a soldier, and Maria Volck (1815–1863). Schepel had two brothers and four older sisters, the eldest of which was the teacher and translator Mimi Hamminck Schepel (1839–1930).

== Career ==
Schepel was a Froebelian educator and the first principal of the Pestalozzi-Fröbel House in Berlin, Germany. She was principal of the institution for over twenty years. She was also a member of the Federation of German Women's Associations.

When the World Columbian Exhibition was held at Chicago, Illinois, United States, in 1893, Schepel attended with a delegation of German women. She presented an exhibit on "German welfare institutions," which had been commissioned by the Reichstag (German parliament). The exhibit inspired a group of Chicago women to establish a student residence on the same principles.

English educator Alice Buckton became interested in the educational ideas of Friedrich Fröbel and travelled to Germany to visit the Pestalozzi-Fröbel House. She met Schepel and persuaded her to come to England in 1896 to set up a similar institution in London. Schepel opened the Sesame Garden and House for Home Life Training in St John's Wood. By 1902, the school at Sesame House had sixty-five students.

== England ==
Buckton and Schepel also became partners who lived together at Byfleet in Surrey. They became members of the Baháʼí Faith and opened their home to Abdu'l-Bahá, head of the faith.

Schepel died in 1931.
