= George Bowdler Buckton =

English chemist and entomologist

George Bowdler Buckton FRS FLS
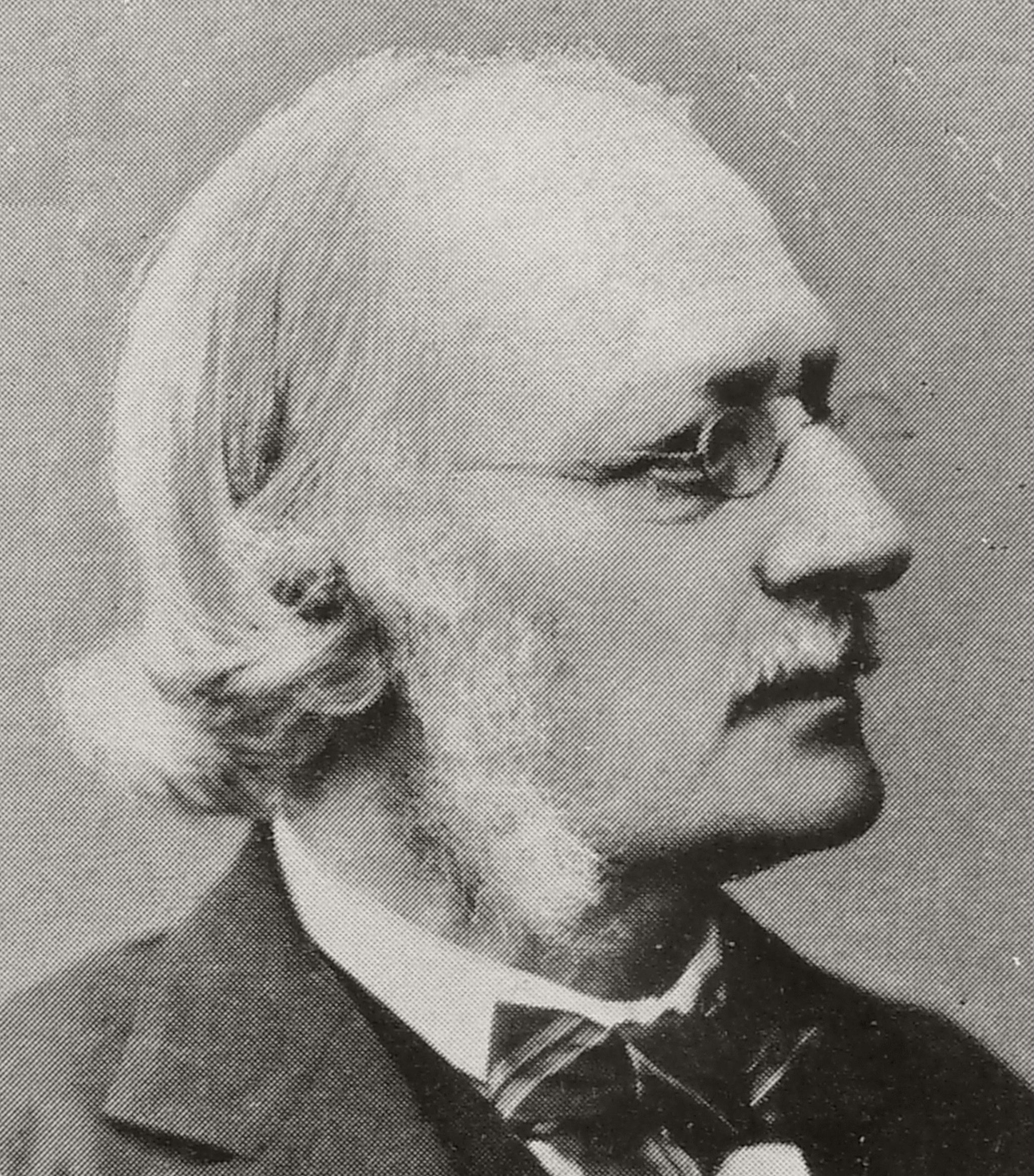
- Born: 24 May 1818; London, England
- Died: 25 September 1905 (aged 87); Haslemere, Surrey, England
- Known for: Natural history of aphids Main-group organometallic chemistry
- Spouse: Mary Ann Odling (m. 1867)
- Children: Alice Buckton
- Scientific career
- Fields: Entomology; Chemistry
- Workplaces: Royal College of Chemistry

George Bowdler Buckton (24 May 1818, London – 25 September 1905, Haslemere, Surrey) was an English chemist and entomologist who specialised in aphids.

== Early life ==
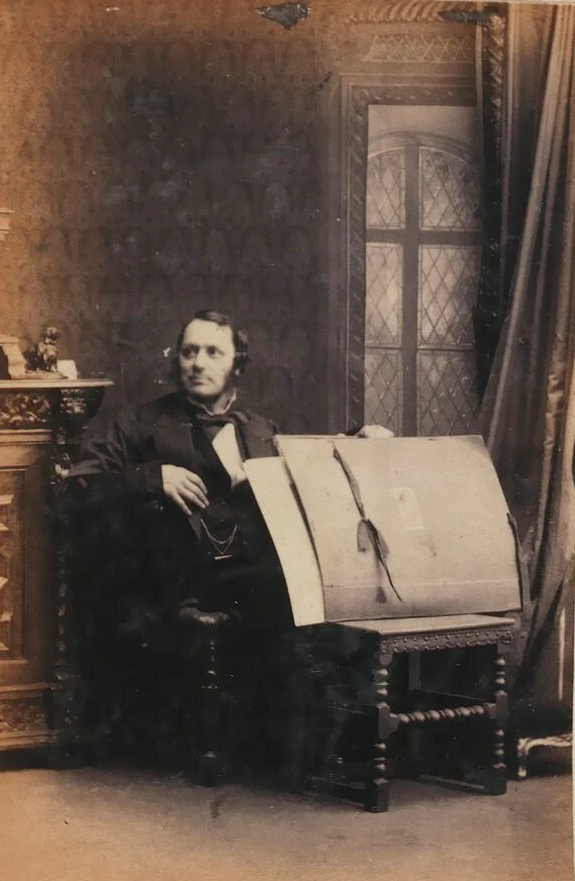
Buckton, in 1862

Buckton was born in London and lived in Hornsey, England. He was the eldest son of George Buckton (1785 - 1847; Proctor to the Prerogative Court of Canterbury) and Eliza Buckton (née Merricks, 1786 - 1842). At the age of five he had an accident which left him partially paralysed for life and so was privately educated. He became however a scholar of classics and was an accomplished musician and painter. After his father's death he moved to Queen's Road, West London, and In 1848 he became an assistant to August Wilhelm von Hofmann (1818-1892) at the nearby Royal College of Chemistry in London. In 1867 he married Mary Ann Odling (1831 – 1927), the sister of William Odling with whom he had written his last chemical paper. He designed his house at Haslemere and built an astronomical observatory there. His eldest daughter was the poet Alice Buckton and Alfred, Lord Tennyson lived nearby.

== Chemistry ==
Buckton's first paper, on reactions of cyanogen with platinum amine complexes, appeared in 1852. He wrote two papers with Hofmann on reactions of sulfuric acid with amides and nitriles. He also published much work on alkyls of main-group elements including on the discovery of the anti-knock agent tetra-ethyl lead. His last paper on chemistry, on trimethyl- and triethylaluminium, appeared in 1865 co-authored with William Odling. Much of his research on alkylmetal compounds has been reviewed by modern authors. ^{[9]} He joined the Chemical Society in 1852 and was elected to the Royal Society in 1857

== Entomology ==
Buckton wrote scientific papers on chemistry until 1865 when he moved to Haslemere and continued a childhoold interest in insects (that had been sparked after meeting Thomas Bell) and began to study the Hemiptera. He joined the Linnaean Society in 1845 and the Entomological Society in 1883. In the field of entomology, he wrote several works:

- Monograph of the British Aphides (four volumes, London, 1876-1883).
- Monograph of the British Cicadae or Tettigidae (two volumes, Macmillan & Co., London, 1890-1891).
- The Natural History of Eristalis tenax or the Drone-Fly (Macmillan & Co., London, 1895).
- A Monograph of the Membracidae, with an article by Edward Bagnall Poulton (1856-1943) (Lovell Reeve & Co., London, 1901-1903).

== Personality ==
Apart from his interests in science, Buckton was a musician and a watercolour artist. He took an interest in physics as well and built a Wimshurst machine after it was described in 1883. He was considered a master of exposition and taught his own children until they were ten years old.

Alfred Lord Tennyson had asked Buckton through William Allingham 'How can evolution account for the ant?' and Buckton had responded that the theory had difficulties. Tennyson remembered on Buckton's death that he had "Truly a devoted, spiritual, knightly nature, with a faith as clear as the height of the pure blue heaven." The genus Bucktoniella Evans, 1966 is named in his honour.
