= Pitton =

Village in Wiltshire, England

Coordinates: 51.081°N 1.699°W

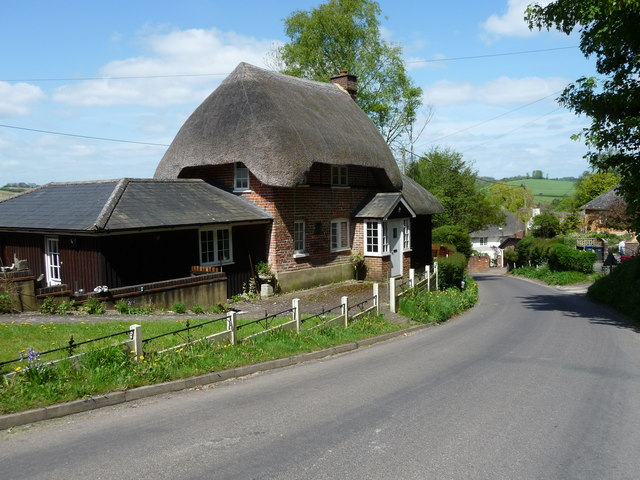
- White Hill, Pitton

- Location within Wiltshire
- Population: 751 (parish, in 2011)
- OS grid reference: SU212313
- Civil parish: Pitton and Farley
- Unitary authority: Wiltshire
- Ceremonial county: Wiltshire
- Region: South West
- Country: England
- Sovereign state: United Kingdom
- Post town: Salisbury
- Postcode district: SP5
- Dialling code: 01722
- Police: Wiltshire
- Fire: Dorset and Wiltshire
- Ambulance: South Western
- UK Parliament: Salisbury
- Website: Parish Council

Pitton is a village in Wiltshire, England, about 7 miles (11 km) east of Salisbury, just off the A30 London Road.

== History ==
A Roman road (now a bridleway) forms the northern boundary of the parish and is a scheduled monument.

== Local government ==
The civil parish of Pitton and Farley encompasses the villages of Pitton and Farley. The parish elects a parish council. It is in the area of Wiltshire Council unitary authority, which is responsible for all significant local government functions.

== Churches ==
The Anglican Church of St Peter is Grade II* listed. It dates from the 12th century and was restored in 1878–80 by Ewan Christian. There is a window by C.E. Kempe. The church was a chapelry of Alderbury until 1874 when the parish of Farley with Pitton was established, with Farley church as the parish church. Today the parish is one of the ten covered by the Clarendon team ministry.

A Wesleyan Methodist chapel was built in 1888 and extended with a schoolroom in 1934. From 2008 to 2011 the building housed an independent school (Milford Park School) and in 2013 it was converted into two residential dwellings.

== Amenities ==
The village has a shop and post office, a pub (The Silver Plough), a park, a village hall and a small recreation ground. Pitton CE Primary School is on the western edge of the village.

The Clarendon Way recreational footpath between Salisbury and Winchester passes through the village.

Wiltshire Council's Roundbarrow Farm is located between Pitton and Firsdown. In 2025 it was announced that the Royal Society for the Protection of Birds would be appointed to manage the farm site, following a competitive bidding exercise. The site will be developed as chalk grassland for farming and as woodland.

Buses into Pitton are operated by Wilts & Dorset, serving two bus stops (one by the park, one at the crossroads). The main buses are the 88 and 89 to Winterslow, although there is also an X87.
