= Roman sites in Great Britain =

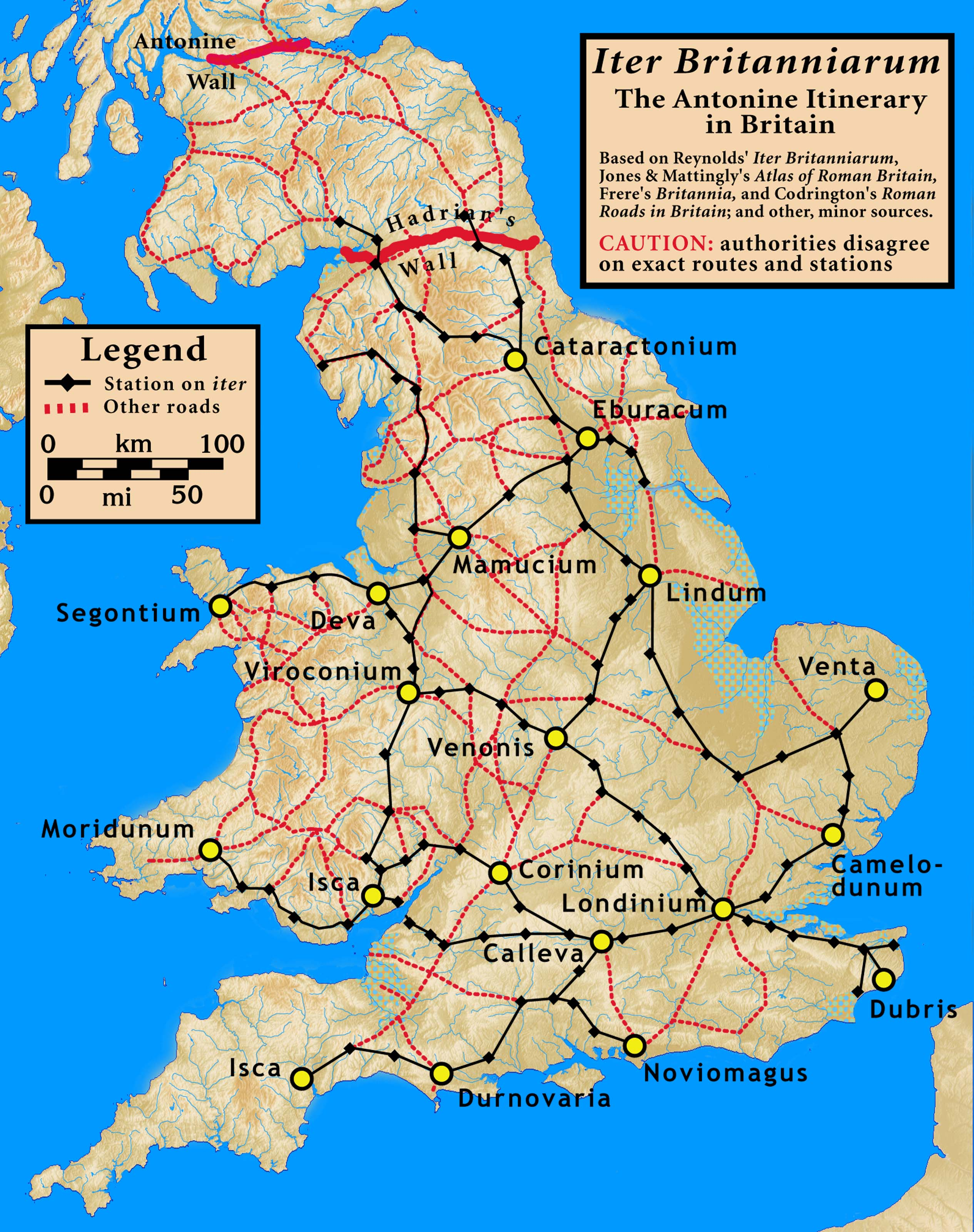
Main Roman cities and roads in Roman Britain, according to the "Antonine Itinerary"

There are many Roman sites in Great Britain that are open to the public. There are also many sites that do not require special access, including Roman roads, and sites that have not been uncovered.

== England ==
- Hadrian's Wall, Northumberland and Cumbria
- The Vallum ditch and mounds adjoining Hadrian's Wall. It was mistakenly attributed to Agricola before the late 19th century, but in fact was the work of Hadrian.
- Batham Gate, Roman road
- Dere Street, Roman road
- Ermine Street, Roman road
- Fosse Way, Roman road
- Icknield Street, Roman Road
- Stane Street (Chichester), Roman road
- Stane Street (Colchester), Roman road
- Stanegate, Roman road that pre-dates Hadrian's Wall
- Watling Street, Roman road

=== Buckinghamshire ===
- Bancroft Park, Milton Keynes. Romano-British villa
- Magiovinium, Fenny Stratford, Milton Keynes

=== Cheshire ===
- Deva Victrix, Chester
- Chester Roman Amphitheatre
- Roman Middlewich, King Street Roman Fort

=== Cumbria ===
- Ambleside Roman Fort
- Birdoswald Roman Fort (Banna). Part of Hadrian's Wall
- Hardknott Roman Fort (Mediobogdum), Eskdale
- Walls Castle (Roman Bath House), Ravenglass

=== Derbyshire ===
- Aquae Arnemetiae (Roman Buxton)
- Ardotalia (Melandra Castle)
- Derventio Coritanorum (Roman Derby)
- Doctor's Gate Roman road
- Lutudarum (Wirksworth or Carsington)
- Navio (Brough-on-Noe)
- The Street Roman road

=== Devon ===
- Isca Dumnoniorum (Roman Exeter). Parts of city wall still exist (overlaid with medieval construction)
- Moridunum, Axminster
- Pomeroy Wood
- Woodbury Farm Roman Fort, near Axminster

=== Dorset ===
- Durnovaria, Dorchester
- Town Walks, Dorchester
- Jordan Hill, Romano-Celtic Temple
- Nunnery Mead, Roman Villa
- Waddon Hill, near Beaminster

=== Durham ===
- Arbeia Roman Fort, South Shields
- Binchester Roman Fort, (called Vinovia by the Romans), Roman fort north of Bishop Auckland
- Concangis, Chester-le-Street
- Longovicium, Lanchester, Roman fort with reservoirs, dams and aqueducts
- Piercebridge Roman Bridge, next to Piercebridge Roman Fort, Piercebridge
- Piercebridge Roman Fort, Piercebridge
- Vinovia, (Binchester Roman Fort), Roman fort north of Bishop Auckland
- Vindomora, Roman fort at Ebchester

=== East Sussex ===
- Pevensey Roman Fort (Anderitum), Pevensey

=== Essex ===
- Belgic oppidum (Roman Braintree)
- Caesaromagus (Roman Chelmsford). A Roman fort was built in AD 60, and a civilian town grew up around it. The town was given the name of Caesaromagus (the market place of Caesar), although the reason for it being given the great honour of bearing the Imperial prefix is now unclear – possibly as a failed 'planned town' provincial capital to replace Londinium or Camulodunum.
- Camulodunum (Roman Colchester). Oldest Roman wall in Britain, best-preserved Roman gateway in Britain, remains of two Roman theatres, oldest Roman church in UK and Castle museum
- Great Dunmow
- Heybridge, Maldon (Anglo-Saxon: Tidwalditun)
- Othona (Roman Bradwell-on-Sea)

=== Gloucestershire ===
- Chedworth Roman Villa, near Cheltenham
- Corinium Dobunnorum, Cirencester
- Great Witcombe Roman Villa
- Glevum (Roman Gloucester). Colonia Nervia Glevensium, Roman walls
- Lydney Park. Romano-Celtic Temple
- Uley
- Woodchester Roman Villa, Woodchester, near Stroud

=== Greater Manchester ===
- Mamucium, Castlefield inner city conservation site, Manchester
- Coccium, near Wigan
- Rigodunum, Castleshaw

=== Hampshire ===
- Calleva Atrebatum, Silchester
- Portchester Roman Fort (Portus Adurni), Portchester
- Rockbourne Roman Villa, Fordingbridge
- Sparsholt Roman Villa
- Venta Belgarum, Winchester

=== Herefordshire ===
- Ariconium, Bury Hill, Weston under Penyard
- Blackwardine
- Bravonium, Leintwardine
- Buckton Roman Fort, near Leintwardine
- Jay Lane, Leintwardine
- Magnae Dobunnorum, Kenchester
- The Weir Garden, River Wye

=== Hertfordshire ===
- Braughing Roman Town (Roman Braughing)
- Gadebridge Park Roman Villa
- Verulamium, near St Albans
- Welwyn Roman baths (part of Dicket Mead Villa)

=== Isle of Wight ===
- Brading Roman Villa
- Newport Roman Villa

=== Kent ===
- Crofton Roman Villa, Orpington
- Dubris (Roman Dover)
- Lullingstone Roman Villa
- Reculver Roman Fort, Reculver
- Rutupiae (Roman Richborough)

=== Leicestershire ===
- High Cross, meeting point of Roman roads
- Jewry Wall, Leicester

=== Lancashire ===
- Bremetennacum, Ribchester
- Lancaster Roman Fort, possibly Galacum
- Over Burrow Roman Fort, possibly Ptolemy's Καλαγον
- Burscough Roman fort, Burscough

=== Lincolnshire ===
- Lincoln (Lindum Colonia), important Roman Colonia and capital of the province of Flavia Caesariensis
- Bourne-Morton Canal (visible only as alignment and crop marks)
- Caistor, Roman town and fort.
- Car Dyke
- Foss Dyke, Roman canal between Lincoln and the River Trent
- Horncastle, Roman town and fort. Parts of the Roman walls remain.
- Newport Arch, Lincoln
- Sleaford, important Roman town.

=== London ===
- Londinium (modern London)
- London Wall, London
- Temple of Mithras
- Amphitheatre at Guildhall, London

=== Norfolk ===
- Branodunum
- Burgh Castle
- Caister-on-Sea
- Caistor St. Edmund
- Gariannonum

=== Northamptonshire ===
- Bannaventa, Norton, Northamptonshire
- Borough Hill Roman villa, Daventry
- Lactodurum, Towcester
- Piddington Roman Villa
- Whitehall Farm Roman villa excavated in Nether Heyford, now re-buried

=== Northumberland ===
- Aesica, Roman fort, north of Haltwhistle
- Bremenium, High Rochester
- Carrawburgh, Mithraeum temple by Hadrian's Wall
- Chesters Bridge, Roman bridge abutment by Chesters Roman Fort (Cilurnum), Northumberland
- Chew Green, Roman Camps in the Cheviots
- Cilurnum, Northumberland
- Coria, Corbridge. Roman site and museum
- Devil's Causeway, Roman road to Berwick upon Tweed
- Featherwood Roman Camps, on Dere Street between Chew Green and Bremenium
- Habitancum, Roman fort at Risingham
- Housesteads (Vercovicium)
- Hunnum, (also known as Onnum, and with the modern name of Haltonchesters), Roman fort north of Halton
- Lees Hall Roman Camp near Haltwhistle
- Magnis (Carvoran Roman Fort)
- Roman Army Museum north of Haltwhistle at Carvoran
- Vercovicium, (or Housesteads Roman Fort) was an auxiliary fort on Hadrian's Wall
- Vindolanda, a fort on the Stanegate Roman road pre-dating Hadrian's Wall nearby, with exceptional Roman finds in its museum
- Vindobala, Roman fort at Rudchester
- Whitley Castle, also known as Epiacum, a Roman fort at the southern edge of Northumberland on the Maiden Way Roman road, with remarkable earthen ramparts

=== North Yorkshire ===
- Eboracum
- Elslack fort, possibly Olenacum
- Isurium Brigantum

=== Nottinghamshire ===
- Ad Pontem (East Stoke)
- Crocolana (Brough)
- Margidunum
- Segelocum or Agelocum (Littleborough)
- Vernometum (Willoughby on the Wolds)

=== Oxfordshire ===
- Alchester
- North Leigh Roman Villa

=== Shropshire ===
- Viroconium Cornoviorum, Wroxeter

=== Somerset ===
- Aquae Sulis (Roman Bath)
- Burrington
- Charterhouse Roman Town and Mining Settlement
- Dolebury Warren
- Ham Hill
- Lindinis (Roman Ilchester)
- Low Ham Roman Villa
- Pagans Hill, Romano-Celtic Temple
- Roman Baths, Bath

=== South Yorkshire ===
A reconstruction of Templeborough Roman Fort which covered an area of 2.2 hectares (5.5 acres) when it was rebuilt in stone in the 2nd century.

- Templeborough

=== Staffordshire ===
- Letocetum, near Lichfield

=== Sussex ===
See East Sussex, West Sussex

=== Tyne and Wear ===
- Segedunum Roman Fort, Wallsend
- Arbeia Roman Fort, South Shields
- Extensive Roman collection in Great North Museum, Newcastle upon Tyne

=== Warwickshire ===
- Lunt Fort, near Coventry
- Tripontium, near Rugby

=== West Midlands ===
- Metchley Fort, Birmingham

=== West Sussex ===
- Bignor Roman Villa, Pulborough
- Fishbourne Roman Palace, Fishbourne, West Sussex
- Noviomagus Reginorum (Roman Chichester)

=== West Yorkshire ===
- Lagentium, Castleford
- Slack, Huddersfield
- Burgodunum, Adel (Leeds)

=== Wiltshire ===
- Cunetio, Mildenhall
- Littlecote Roman Villa

=== Worcestershire ===
- Overbury

== Scotland ==
- Antonine Wall
- Auchendavy
- Bar Hill Fort
- Bothwellhaugh Roman Fort, North Lanarkshire
- Castlehill Fort
- Croy Hill
- Inchtuthil, Perth and Kinross
- Mumrills
- Oakwood Roman Fort and Camp, near Selkirk, Scottish Borders
- Seabegs Wood
- Trimontium, Newstead, Melrose, Scottish Borders
- Watling Lodge
- Roman Bath House, Bearsden
- Rough Castle Fort, near Tamfourhill
- Cramond Roman Fort excavations
- Cawdor (Roman Fort), near Inverness

Inveresk Mithreum, by Musselburgh, near Edinburgh, link: https://www.cambridge.org/core/journals/britannia/article/mithras-in-scotland-a-mithraeum-at-inveresk-east-lothian/544B6233F7F06415EE049C60A827C3C0

== Wales ==
- Abergavenny Roman fort, Gobannium
- Alabum Llandovery Roman fort
- Blestium Monmouth Roman fort
- Caer Gybi, Anglesey Roman fort
- Caerleon, Newport, Monmouthshire Roman fortress and amphitheatre
- Caersws Roman Forts, Powys
- Caerwent, Monmouthshire. Roman town - the only one in Wales
- Cardiff Roman Fort
- Cold Knap, Barry
- Cowbridge Roman Town probably Bovium
- Dolaucothi Gold Mines, Carmarthenshire. Fort, settlement and museum.
- Gelligaer small Roman fort
- Gateholm, Pembrokeshire
- Llan Ffestiniog, Gwynedd fort & amphitheatre
- Luentinum Roman fort at Pumsaint, Carmarthenshire
- Moridunum, Carmarthen
- Nidum, Neath, Glamorgan. Roman fort
- Penydarren, Merthyr Tydfil. Roman fort
- Sarn Helen Roman road
- Segontium Roman Fort, Caernarfon
- Usk Burrium early legionary base
- Y Gaer, Brecon cavalry base

== See also ==
- List of Roman place names in Britain
- List of Latin place names in Britain
- Roman Britain
- Sub-Roman Britain
- Roman Scotland
- Roman Wales
- Romano-Celtic Temple
