= List of Roman sites in the Peak District =

The Peak District, located in central England in the United Kingdom, is the site of several Roman settlements, forts, roads and Romano-British farms.

== List ==
=== Settlements ===
Roman towns recorded in the Ravenna Cosmography's list of all known places in the world in about 700 AD.

Name	Location	Notes	Photo
Aquae Arnametiae	Buxton	The settlement was based around its natural warm springs. The Roman occupation ran from around 75 AD to 410 AD. Remains of baths, walls, temple base and milestone. Roman farm at Staden.	Milestone: From Navio 11 miles
Ardotalia	Gamesley near Glossop	Roman fort also known as Melandra, or Melandra Castle.	
Lutudarum	Wirksworth or Carsington	Lutudarum is acknowledged as being the administrative centre of the Roman lead mining industry in Britain.	Replica lead ingots from Lutudarum
Navio	Brough-on-Noe	Roman fort and vicus. Originally built of timber and earthworks around 100 BC. It was rebuilt in stone around 150BC and was in use until around 350 AD. The site now consists of earthwork banks and ditches around an earthen platform, buried remains and a few exposed stone slabs. Excavations in 1903 revealed an underground chamber of the Principia or headquarters building.	

=== Roads ===
Name	Location	Notes	Photo
Batham Gate	Between Buxton and Navio fort at Brough-on-Noe.	The name from medieval times means "road to the bath town". The 1-mile-long course of Roman road on Tideswell Moor is a scheduled monument.	Route of Batham Gate Road near Peak Forest
Doctor's Gate	Between Melandra fort at Glossop and Navio fort at Brough-on-Noe.	Named after Dr John Talbot, from the 15th century.	Doctor's Gate path east of Old Glossop
Hereward Street	Between Chesterfield and Rocester, via Matlock and Wirksworth	Recognised as a Roman road but its name is disputed.	
Long Causeway	Between Navio fort at Brough-on-Noe and South Yorkshire.	The section of this Roman road at Stanage Edge is a scheduled monument.	
The Street	From Buxton towards Little Chester (Derventio) near Derby.	The road has been traced from surviving archaeological features from Buxton as far as Longcliffe, just north of Brassington.	Plaque by Buxton to Derby Roman Road

=== Other sites ===
Name	Location	Notes	Photo
Bamford Edge	East of Ladybower Reservoir	Romano-British farmstead Romano-British farmstead and post-medieval charcoal burning site	
Chesterfield Fort	Chesterfield	Site of a Roman fort on Station Road, excavated in the 1970s.	
Dimin Dale	South of Taddington Wood near Sheldon	Romano-British settlement and field system.	
Highstones	Near Tintwistle	Roman fortlet.	
Rainster Rocks	Brassington	Romano-British settlement and field system below the dolomitic limestone outcrop of Rainster Rocks with terraces, embankments, platforms and boulder field walls.	
Roystone Grange	Ballidon	5 scheduled monuments: Prehistoric and Romano-British barrow. Romano-British field systems. Romano-British field wall and embankment.	
The Warren	North of Hathersage	Romano-British settlement.	

== See also ==
- List of Roman place names in Britain
- Scheduled monuments in Derbyshire Dales
- Scheduled monuments in High Peak
