= Bradwell Moor =

Hill in the Derbyshire Peak District

Coordinates: 53°19′12″N 1°47′06″W

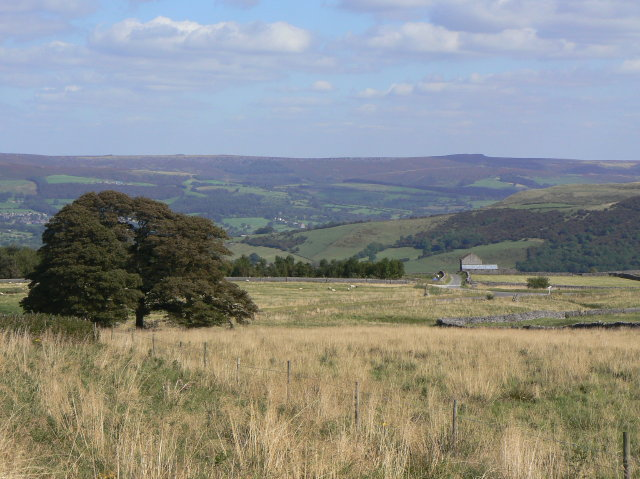
- View towards the Hope Valley

Highest point
- Elevation: 471 metres (1,545 ft)

Geography
- Location: Peak District, England
- OS grid: SK 1443 8039
- Topo map: OS Explorer OL24

Bradwell Moor is a moorland hill above the village of Bradwell, Derbyshire in the Peak District. The summit is 471 metres (1,545 ft) above sea level.

Batham Gate Roman road ran across the moor, from nearby Navio Roman fort (at Brough-on-Noe) to Aquae Arnemetiae (Buxton). Batham Gate is Old English for "road to the bath town". Clement Lane follows the original route across the moor. The section of Batham Gate road east of Peak Forest is a protected Scheduled Monument.

There are numerous historic lead mines around the moor which are protected Scheduled Monuments. Lead mining in the area dates back to the Bronze Age, with larger scale production in Roman times. Cop Rake and Moss Rake lead mines (include the sites of Starvehouse Mine, New York Mine and Cop Mine) have been extracting lead-bearing ore from veins near the surface since at least the 13th century (when it was recorded as Wardlow Cop).

Hope Quarry is a large limestone quarry that covers the north-east side of the moor between Castleton and Bradwell. The quarry is now operated by Breedon. In 1990 a Mesolithic stone working site was discovered by The Trent & Peak Archaeological Trust where Bradwell Moor Barn once stood, before the land was excavated by the quarry operator at the time (Blue Circle).

The highest point of the Limestone Way long-distance footpath is at 461 metres (1,512 ft) where it crosses Bradwell Moor, slightly west of its summit.
