= Lutudarum =

Town in Roman Britain in mid-Derbsyhire

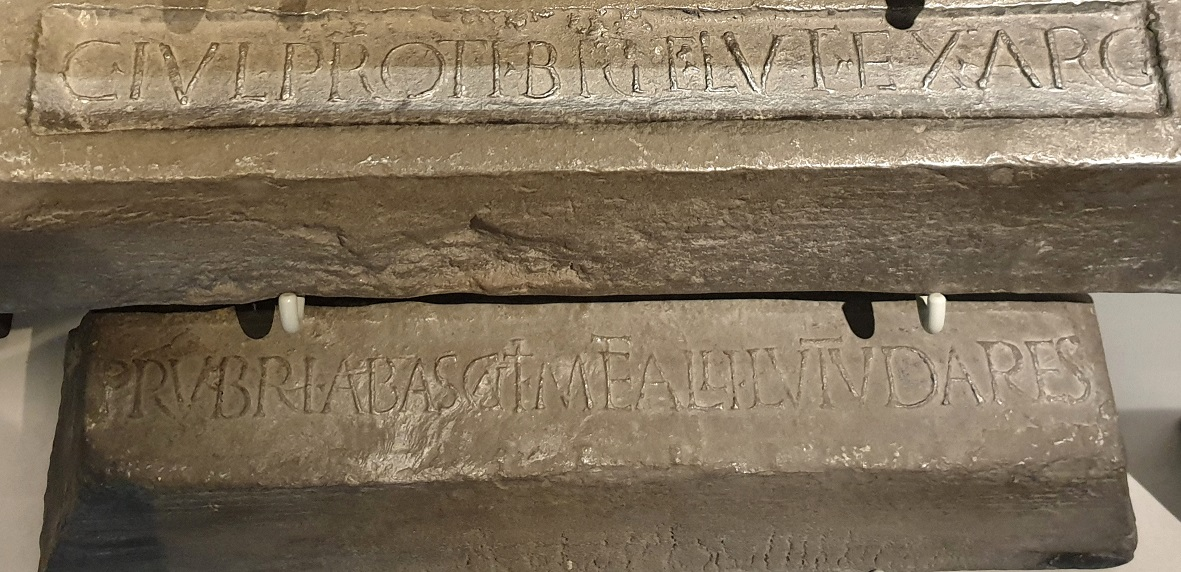
Replica Roman lead ingots on display in Buxton Museum

Lutudarum was a town in the Roman province of Britannia, in the area that is now mid-Derbyshire. The settlement was believed to have been at either Wirksworth or nearby Carsington. However, Barnatt and Smith in their most recent assessment, determined that Carsington was not proven as Lutudarum, although Matlock and Cromford might be other candidates. Matlock was dismissed by its own historian Nailor in his excellent history of the Matlocks and Dennis had considered that Cromford might represent a river wharf on the Derwent but would not be Lutudarum. This leaves only Wirksworth as the likely location. The town was recorded as Lutudaron between Derventio (Little Chester in modern Derby) and Veratino (Rocester) in the Ravenna Cosmography's list of all known places in the world in about 700 AD.

Derbyshire was important for lead-mining in Roman Britain. Romans used lead for water pipes, cisterns, coffins, weights and pewter tableware. Numerous lead ingots (pigs) have been found in Derbyshire, four in Sussex in 1824 and nine around Hull with LVT, LVTVM or LVTVDARVM marked on them (from their clay moulds). In 1777 a lead pig found at Cromford had the inscription IMP CAES HADRIANI AVG MET LVT (an abbreviation of Imperatoris Caesaris Hadriani Augusti Metalli Lutudarensis), which translates as 'Property of Caesar Hadrian Augustus from the Lutudarum mines'. In 1848 a lead ingot weighing over 80 kg and inscribed C.IVL.PROTI.BRIT.LVT.EX.ARG was found in 1848 at Hexgrave Park near Mansfield. In 1975 two such lead pigs were found near Yeaveley a mile north of the Roman road (now Long Lane) that linked the Roman forts at Rocester and Derventio. These were marked SOCORIVM LVTVD meaning the Lutudarum Company. The finds at Hull are thought to indicate that lead was sent by boat from Derbyshire down the River Trent and then the Humber river to the Roman port of Peturia (Brough on Humber) for shipping elsewhere by sea. The name Lutudarum may have been derived from the Brittonic term Lud meaning ashes, referring to the heaps of waste material from lead production.

Lutudarum is acknowledged as being the administrative centre of the Roman lead mining industry in Britain. Research and field work to discover its location in the White Peak (southern limestone area of the Peak District) have focused on sites at Wirksworth and Carsington. The Street Roman road from Aquae Arnemetiae (Buxton) and The Portway road from Navio Roman fort (at Brough) converged on this area. Excavations in the 1980s discovered remains of a Roman settlement at Carsington, including a villa or farmstead, a group of other buildings and various artefacts, including two pigs of lead (weighing about 50 kg each). Reproductions of these lead ingots are on display in the Buxton Museum. Evidence of lead working was also found such as off cuts of lead sheets, lead slag and pits containing galena ore. The settlement was permanently flooded beneath Carsington Water reservoir in 1992. No remains of Roman buildings have been found in Wirksworth, although in 1735 the Roman coin hoard 'of the five emperors' was found there. It was also a local medieval centre and is the probable junction of several Roman roads. Wirksworth is recorded in the Domesday Book in 1086 with a church, three lead works and the largest population of the ancient market towns in the Peak District. The 1723 map of Brassington Moor shows The Street road from Buxton up to the Upper Harborough Field Gate, which leads onto Brassington Lane towards Wirksworth. In records from 1613 the road from Brassington to Wirksworth is called 'Highe Streete'.

== See also ==
- List of Roman sites in the Peak District
- Derbyshire lead mining history
