= Moridunum =

Moridunum may refer to:

- Moridunum (Carmarthen), a Roman settlement at what is now Carmarthen in Wales
- Moridunum (Axminster), a Roman settlement at what is now Axminster in England
