= Waddon Hill =

Hill in Dorset, England

Coordinates: 50.81040°N 2.78625°W

Highest point
- Elevation: 207 m (679 ft)
- Prominence: 35 m (115 ft)
- Parent peak: Lewesdon Hill

Geography
- Location: Marshwood Vale, Dorset
- OS grid: ST448015
- Topo map: OS Explorer 193

Waddon Hill shown within Dorset
(grid reference ST447015)

Waddon Hill is a hill and the site of a short-lived Roman fort near Beaminster, in the English county of Dorset. The name Waddon is from the Old English, meaning wheat hill.

The Wessex Ridgeway passes to the north of the hill summit and Roman fort. The B3162 road passes close to the western end of the hill. Lewesdon Hill is about 0.6 miles (1 km) to the west.

There is no public right of way on the summit of Waddon Hill, although a footpath runs just to the north. The need to protect the site from illegal detecting, and geological specimen collecting, has forced limiting access.

== Iron Age ==
Richard Hine writing in his 1914 "History of Beaminster" asserted there was an Iron Age encampment before the Roman Fort. His Bronze Age finds from the site are unpublished, though the larger blade is on display in Dorchester. The other blade and axe will go on display in Beaminster Museum from April 2026.The 2023 geophysics also shows some features that may be of Iron Age date, with possible hut circles to the north.

== Roman fort ==
The fort is on a narrow east-west ridge reaching a height of 210 m, with steep natural slopes to the south and west, and linear ramparts facing north and east. Richard Hine in his 1914 history, conjectured it was on the site of an earlier Iron Age settlement, and this was confirmed by the 2023 geophysics, which showed round houses much damaged by both the Roman construction and the 19th century quarrying.

The fort was built by the Second Legion under Vespasian, but after the occupation of Dorset. Though it is conjectured that the fort originated as a temporary camp during the campaign against nearby Pilsdon Pen, Pilsdon Pen was almost certainly abandoned before the invasion, and the claimed Roman ballista bolt on display in Dorchester museum is too large to be a ballista bolt. There is a recently (2017) discovered much larger marching camp at Bradford Abbas, possibly the main early fort in the area, or simply a marching camp as Legio 2 Augusta moved west. The fort at Hembury in Devon is a days march away, and itself a days march from Exeter, and had a similar lifespan to this fort, prior to demolition in 60 CE, presumably as Exeter became the base for the whole legion, and transport routes moved to the developing Fosse way.

First recognition of the site came when 19th century quarrying uncovered military artefacts from the 1st century AD. A brooch and coin was given to the then landowner, Mary Cox of Beaminster Manor House. James Ralls, a Bridport ironmonger and a Mr Powlesland from Crewkerne worked at the site in 1878 to 1882, with a detailed article written by the Bridport based Shakespearian scholar Walter Boswell-Stone, whose father was born in Stoke Abbott, given as a lecture at the Bridport Literary Institute in 1892. The Ralls collection of material passed to the Colfox family, who donated it to the Bridport Museum in the 1930s. The residual items collected by Powlesland were auctioned by Sotheby's in 1948 and were bought by the Ashmolean Museum, Oxford. The site was investigated by Graham Webster in a series of archaeological excavations between 1959 and 1962, which revealed the full layout of the camp, except for areas destroyed by the quarrying. Webster researched and published all the known finds, but missed the Hine material. Though written up by Webster, the Tolley's private collection found while farming, was only donated to the Bridport Museum in 2018, with material on show in the summer of 2025. Almost all of the Webster material is at Bridport Museum and Art Gallery, with some at Dorset Museum & Art Gallery and some items on loan to Beaminster Museum. The permanent structure of the fort appears to have been built and occupied in the period 50–60 AD, and not started until after the abandonment of Hod Hill further east. The site was abandoned at the same time as the Boudiccan revolt (AD 61), and as transport routes were already evolving along the Fosse Way axis to the North and the coast. The Roman road to Waddon followed an ancient trackway (the Wessex Ridgeway) that left the main Dorchester-Axminster road at Two Gates, passed through Eggardon Hill, then south of Beaminster, to enter Waddon from the east as it passed on just to the north of Lewesdon Hill, to the south of Pilsdon Pen, and the north of Lamberts Castle hill fort. In the 1950s tesserae were found in a nearby field to the north, which may be the site of the Fort's bathhouse, which would be one of the earliest mosaics in England. Material from the fort found on Chartknolle to the east is on display in Stoke Abbott village hall. In 2023 Bournemouth University conducted new geophysics in the area, expected to be published in Brittania in 2026. . In November 2025 three small trenches were excavated outside the scheduled area to better understand some of the geophysical anomalies.

== See also ==
- Lewesdon Hill
- Pilsdon Pen
- Hod Hill
