= Gamesley =

Village in Derbyshire, England

Coordinates: 53.4481°N 1.9859°W

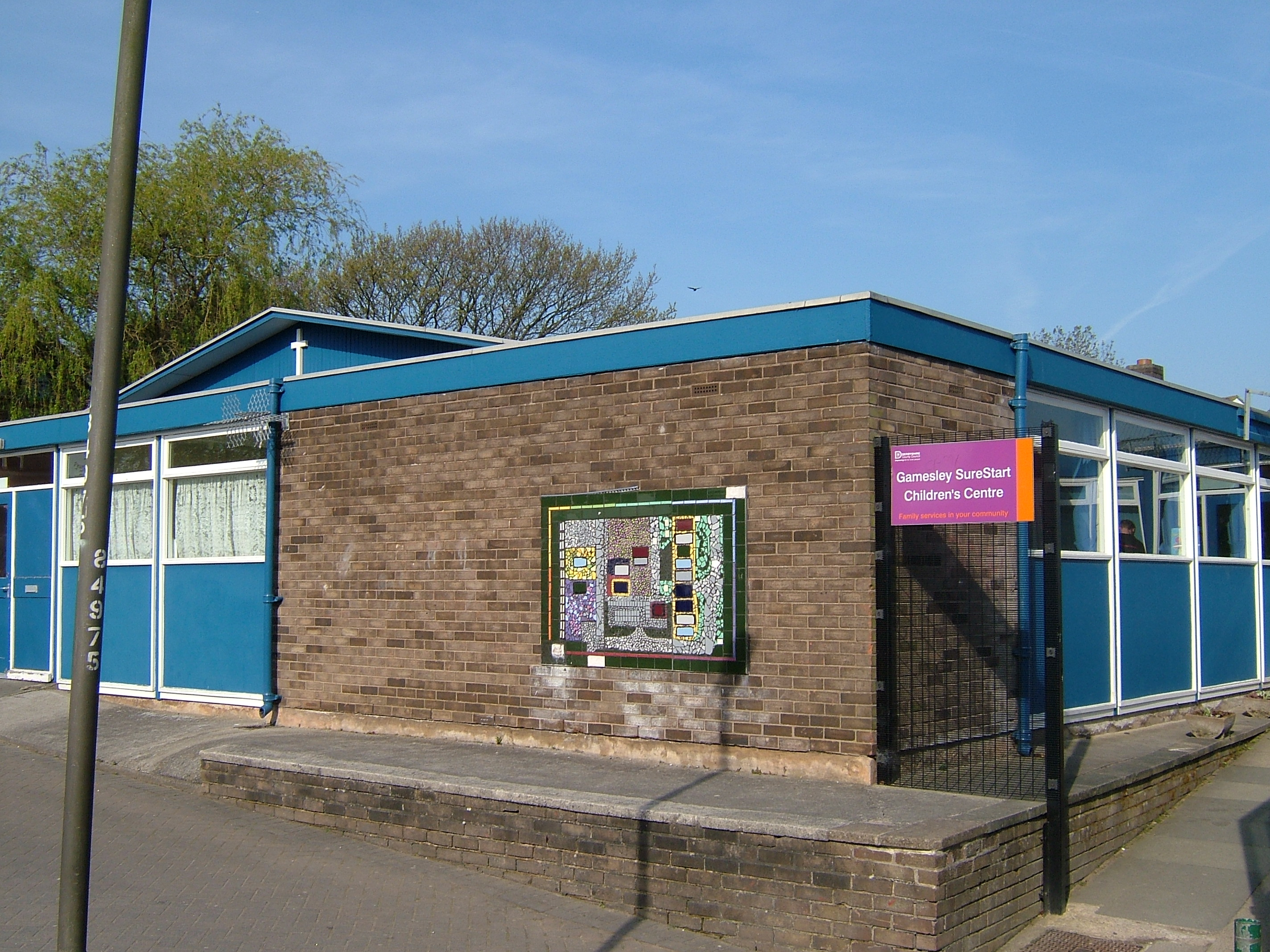
- At the centre of the estate

- Location within Derbyshire
- Population: 3,100 (Area - ONS 2021)
- OS grid reference: SK008945
- District: High Peak
- Shire county: Derbyshire
- Region: East Midlands
- Country: England
- Sovereign state: United Kingdom
- Post town: GLOSSOP
- Postcode district: SK13
- Dialling code: 01457
- Police: Derbyshire
- Fire: Derbyshire
- Ambulance: North West
- UK Parliament: High Peak

Gamesley is a residential area within the Borough of High Peak in Derbyshire, England, west of Glossop and close to the River Etherow which forms the boundary with Tameside in Greater Manchester. Gamesley is a ward of the High Peak Borough Council. It had a population of 2,531 at the 2011 Census.

== History ==
=== Early ===
Gamesley is the site of a Roman fort, Ardotalia, renamed "Melandra" in the 19th century by an amateur historian. It was one of a string of forts built along the route from Lincoln (Lindum Colonia) to Chester (Deva). It also lies on the route from Derby (Derventio) via Buxton (Aquae Arnemetiae) to Manchester (Mamucium) It was built about 108 AD in the reign of the Emperor Trajan and abandoned about 150–155 AD.

=== Construction of the estate ===
The original village of Gamesley consisted of rows of cottages inhabited by workers at the local textile mills, and it remained largely undeveloped until the 1960s, when it underwent considerable change. It was chosen as the location of an overspill estate, built by Manchester City Council. This was in order to rehouse people from decaying inner city areas of Manchester. These housing areas were also built in other towns surrounding Manchester, such as nearby Hattersley on the outskirts of Hyde.

The Gamesley estate was built in two halves. The first houses were built by contractors Finnegans which were constructed with flat felted roofs, pebbledash-clad ground floors and tile-cladded first floors. Finnegans' houses were equipped with warm air central heating that used gas as an energy source. The Finnegan side of the estate was known locally as the 'gas side'. In the late 1980s the local authority renovated the Finnegan system built houses; the works included re-enveloping the external building with traditional bricks and mortar. The works also added apex roofing complete with roofing tiles. The second half of the Gamesley estate was built a couple of years later by George Wimpey using the Wimpey no-fines house building method. The houses were constructed with full pebbledash finish and tiled apex roofing. The houses built by George Wimpey had a solid concrete ground floor which had electrical underfloor heating installed' the first floors of these houses were built with no heating. Because electricity was the main energy source for heating, the George Wimpey side of Gamesley became known locally as the 'electric side'. Unlike the Finnegan part of the estate, which has seen full facelifts to the properties, little has changed externally to the houses on the George Wimpey side. In late 2000s and early 2010s, all council-owned properties (and some privately owned properties if the owner choose to at their expense) had external insulation added to improve energy efficiency. The external insulation was finished with pebbledash.

Gamesley staged events in July 2008 to mark the 40th anniversary since it was first built and people from Manchester began moving onto the estate.

== Culture and community ==
The Trans Pennine Trail passes through Gamesley on its way from Southport to Hornsea. Gamesley is on the West section of the Trail, which is well signposted throughout the estate.

A Roman Garden was established in 2006 with the help of the Countryside Agency's 'Doorstep Greens' programme.

The estate is home to Gamesley Fold Cottage Garden, a well-known garden and house dating back to 1650. The garden has been featured on television and in glossy magazines, and it is open to the public every year under the National Gardens Scheme, as well as private visits.
