= The Street (Derbyshire) =

Roman road in England, linking Derby and Manchester

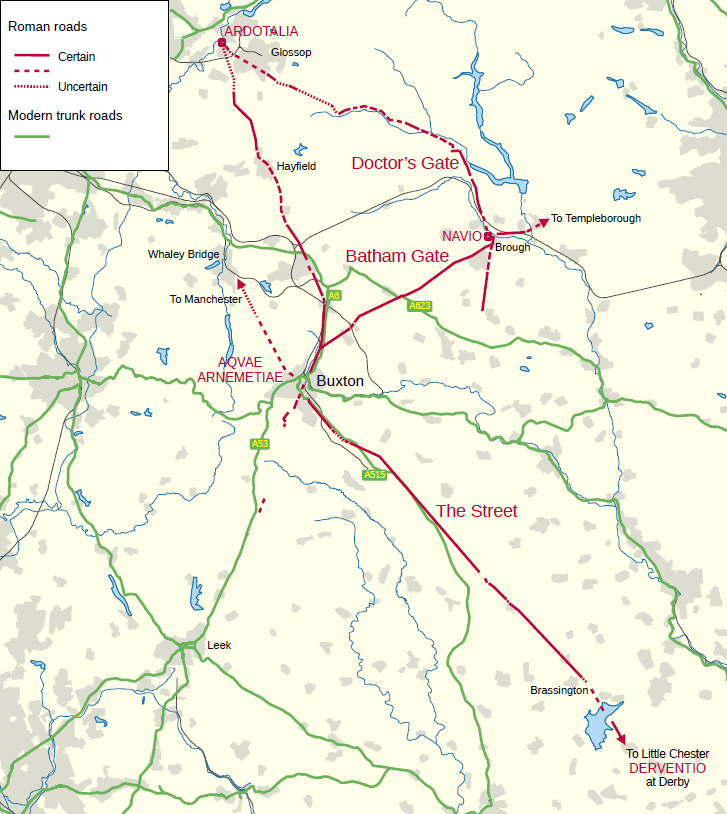
Roman Roads in the Peak District

The Street is the medieval name of the Roman road that ran across the high limestone plateau of central Derbyshire from the spa town of Buxton (Latin Aquae Arnemetiae) southeast towards modern Derby. The line of the road can be traced from surviving features, confirmed by archaeology, from Buxton as far as Longcliffe just north of Brassington. It is believed that from Brassington the road ran eastwards to Wirksworth and there joined another road which crossed the Derwent at Milford and ran on the east bank of the Derwent and can be traced to the northern suburbs of Derby to Little Chester, the site of the Roman settlement of Derventio. The 1723 map of Brassington Moor shows The Street road from Buxton through Pikehall up to the Upper Harborough Field Gate, leading onto Manystones Lane & Brassington Lane towards Wirksworth (probable site of the Roman town Lutudarum). In records from 1613 the road from Brassington to Wirksworth is called 'Highe Streete'.

The Romans built farmsteads near the Street, to feed the soldiers and growing population in the area. Remains of a farm have been found near Minninglow. Excavations by Lomas at Minninglow in 1958 revealed the layered agger structure of the Roman road. The Street was recorded as 'Streete Way' in 1533 in the Bateman Manuscript, Chatsworth. On current OS maps there are many names related to The Street such as Street Farm, Street House Farm, Middle Street Farm and Straight (Street) Knolls Barn. There are documents from 963 AD and about 1223 that suggest The Street was previously known as King Street.

In the 1950s historian Ivan Margary assigned The Street (from Little Chester through Buxton to Manchester) the Margary Number of 71 in his book The Roman Roads of Britain.

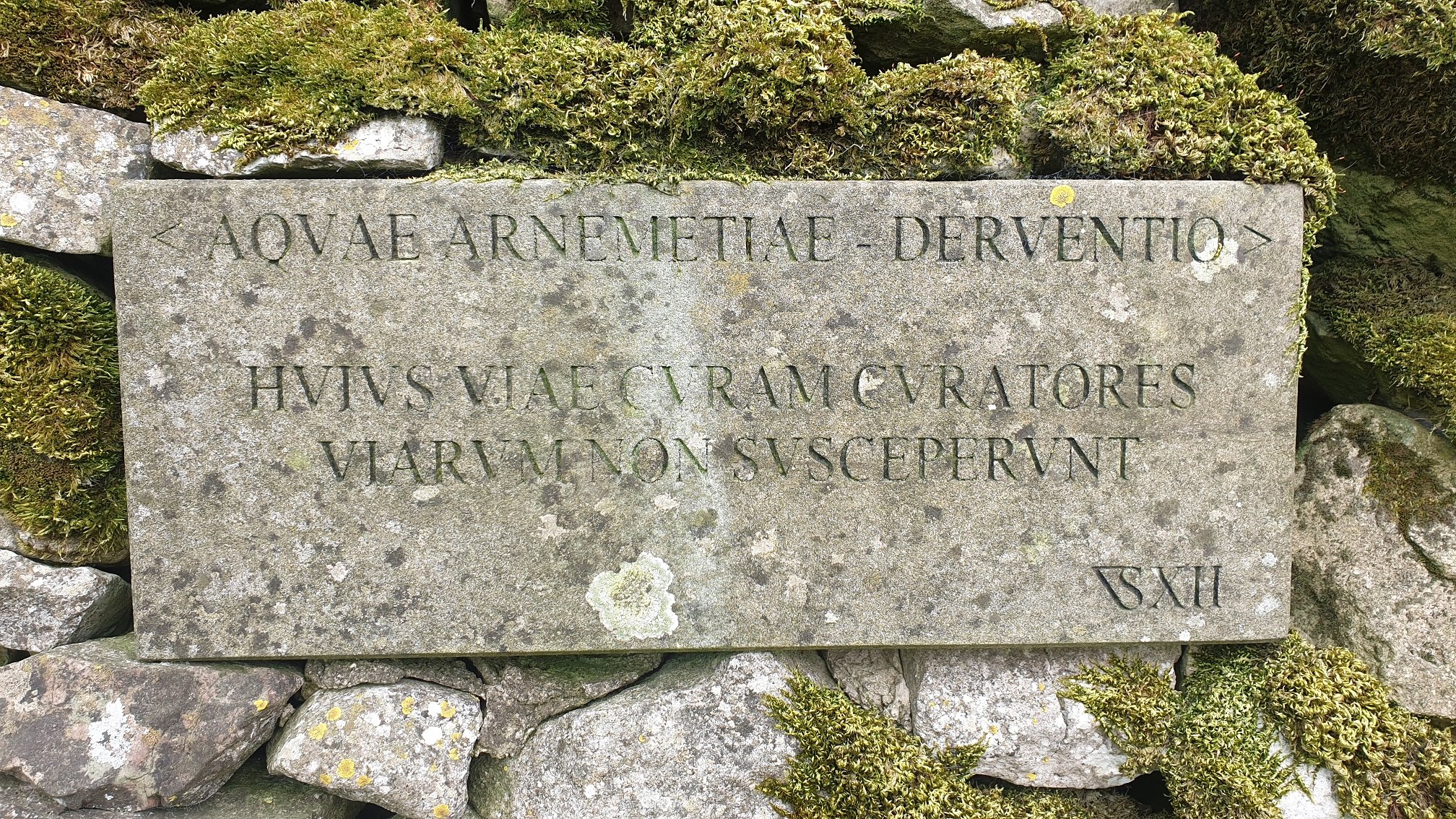
Plaque by Buxton to Derby Roman Road

A plaque in the stone wall by The Street 'Buxton Derby' road near Arbor Low (at OS map location SK 1649 6232) is inscribed: "Huius viae curam curatores viarum non susceperunt". This translates as "The road menders have not taken care of this road".

North west of Buxton, the road west of the Upper Goyt Valley is called The Street.

The course of the Roman road north from Buxton to Melandra fort (near Glossop) was identified in 1970. The agger of a Roman road (running due north to Dove Holes from the junction of Batham Gate Roman road with the A6 road) confirmed the observations of this route by Turner in 1903. Six other sections of road were identified by this field work and excavations. This allowed the route to be plotted running through Chapel-en-le-Frith, Chapel Minton, Hayfield and up to Cown Edge, to within 3 miles of Melandra.

== Bibliography ==
- G. Guilbert, K. Challis, "Excavations across the supposed line of 'the Street' Roman road south-east of Buxton, 1991" in Derbyshire Archaeological Journal vol. 113 (1991) pp. 45–60
- J. Lomas, "Problems of the Roman Road between Buxton and Little Chester, Derby" in Derbyshire Archaeological Journal vol. 78 (1958)
- A. Shone and D. Smart, "The Street: A re-evaluation of the Roman road from Wirksworth to Buxton" (2017) Wirksworth Archaeological Society
