= Staden, Derbyshire =

Hamlet in Derbyshire, England

Coordinates: 53.2504°N 1.8963°W

Staden
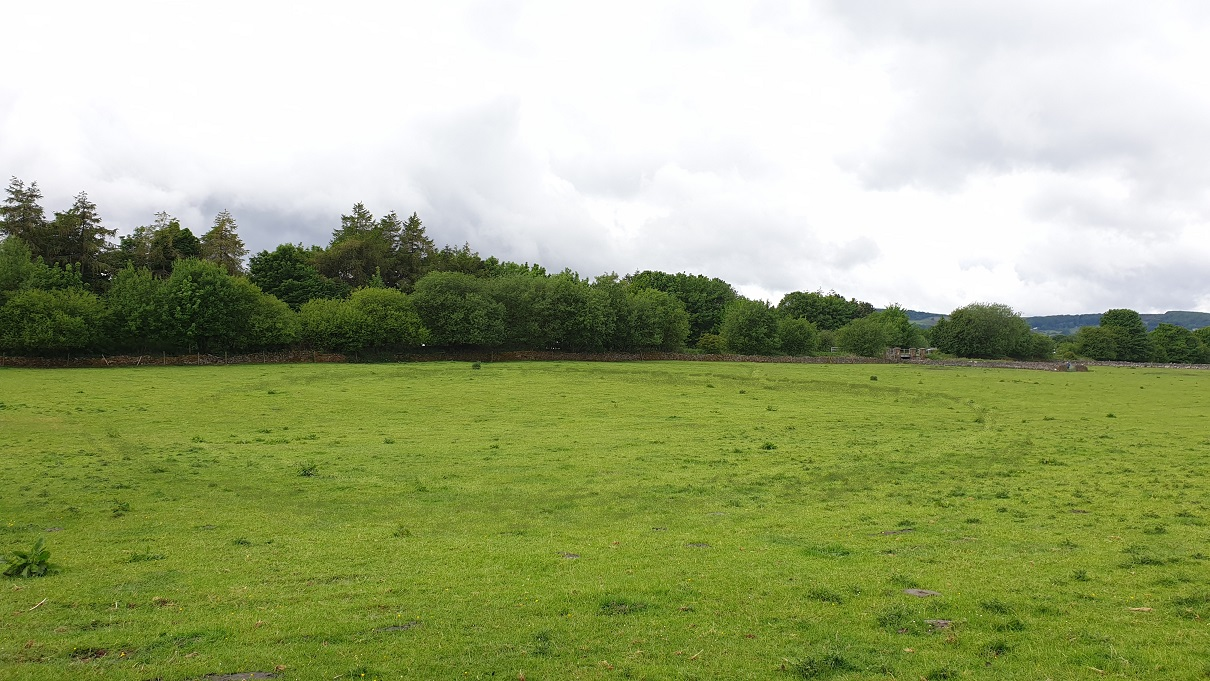
- Staden Low earthwork enclosure

- Location within Derbyshire
- OS grid reference: SK070726
- District: High Peak
- Shire county: Derbyshire
- Region: East Midlands
- Country: England
- Sovereign state: United Kingdom
- Post town: Buxton
- Postcode district: SK17
- Police: Derbyshire
- Fire: Derbyshire
- Ambulance: East Midlands

Staden is a small hamlet (of just a few buildings) on the southern outskirts of Buxton, Derbyshire, lying between Harpur Hill and Cowdale. It was occupied in Neolithic, Roman and medieval times. Staden is close to the limestone hilltop of Staden Low whose summit is 367 m (1,204 ft) above sea level.

Staden Low prehistoric earthwork is in a field on the western side of Staden Low hill. It is in the form of a slightly raised circular bank (over 50m across) with a smaller adjoining rectangular bank (which is a unique enclosure feature of British henges). Neolithic artefacts were discovered during excavations in 1926 by Mr R. Woolescroft, including a polished stone axe head and many fragments of knapped flint. Further excavations by Dr G. Makepeace in the 1980s uncovered Neolithic pottery sherds and pieces of deer antlers. The finds are on display in Buxton Museum. The site is a protected Scheduled Monument. Aerial LIDAR image of Staden Enclosure by the Environment Agency.

Staden is one mile south of the Roman town of Aquae Arnemetiae (Roman Buxton) and there was a Roman farm at Staden (around the present Colt Croft Farm). The fields around Staden have rich volcanic soils for farming. Excavations by Dr Makepeace in the 1980s found the platforms of several buildings, walls, field enclosure banks, quern grinding stones, pottery, animal bones and jewellery. The potter's stamp of Sepuminus dates the pottery to 100–130 AD. A hypocaust tile found in the farm house demonstrates that it had an underfloor heating system. The stone platform of a 12th-century medieval longhouse (22m long) was also identified at the same site in 1989. Documents record Staden as a farming settlement in 1101 AD.

There are the remains of an old quarry and lime kiln immediately south of the hilltop.

In 1896 Buxton Cemetery on Ashbourne Road was consecrated on 12 acres of land on Staden Moor. The gothic-style cemetery building (with a central archway and a mortuary chapel on either side), the caretaker's house and the registrar's office were designed by the town surveyor Joseph Hague. The tombstone of the Buxton archaeologist Micah Salt from 1915 is a replica of the Anglo-Saxon cross in Eyam cemetery and it is a Grade II listed structure.

The new Buxton fire station and rescue centre (opened in 2011) and Staden industrial estate are on the A515 road past the cemetery. Buxton Brewery was established in 2009 and is based on Staden Lane.

The Midshires Way and the Peak District Boundary Walk long-distance footpaths run along the same west–east route through Staden.

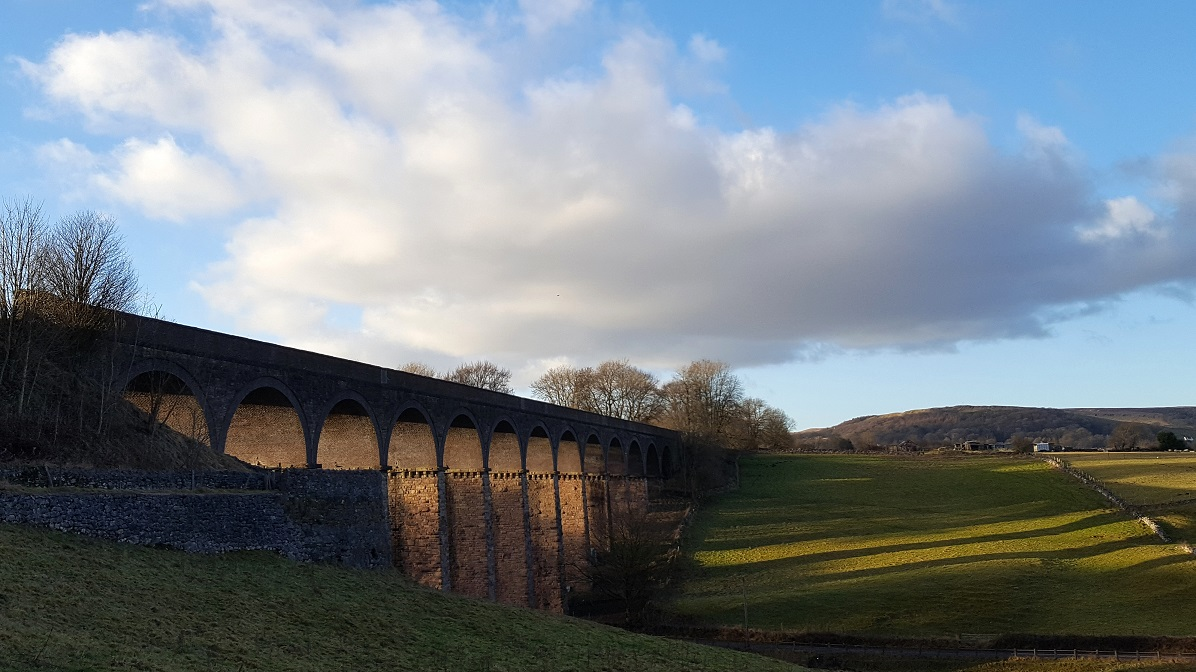
Railway Viaduct from Staden Low
