= Listed buildings in Brough and Shatton =

Brough and Shatton is a civil parish in the High Peak district of Derbyshire, England. The parish contains six listed buildings that are recorded in the National Heritage List for England. All the listed buildings are designated at Grade II, the lowest of the three grades, which is applied to "buildings of national importance and special interest". The parish, which contains the small settlements of Brough-on-Noe and Shatton, is almost entirely rural. The listed buildings consist of houses, a cottage, outbuildings, and a bridge.

== Buildings ==
Name and location	Photograph	Date	Notes
Shatton Hall Farmhouse; 53.33609°N 1.71621°W	—	Mid 16th century	The farmhouse, which was later extended, is in gritstone, partly rendered, with quoins and a stone slate roof. There are two storeys and a T-shaped plan, consisting of a main range and a cross wing. On the east front is the projecting gabled cross-wing on the left, and to its right is a doorway that has a lintel with a cambered arch and a pediment. The windows are mullioned, the window to the right of the doorway with five lights.
The Homestead and outbuildings 53.33865°N 1.70028°W		17th century	The house, and the outbuildings now converted for residential use, are in gritstone, with a stone slate roof and one coped gable, and two storeys. The house on the right has three bays, a doorway with a chamfered surround, and sash windows. The outbuildings, angled on the left, contain two segmental-arched carriage entrances, a doorway with a chamfered surround, and mullioned windows with some mullions removed.
Outbuildings south of Westfield House; 53.33497°N 1.69884°W	—	Late 17th century	A former house flanked by outbuildings in gritstone with a stone slate roof and one coped gable. There are two storeys, and the former house in the centre has three bays, two doorways, one blocked with an inserted window, and mullioned windows. The flanking outbuildings contain doorways and windows, those on the left with massive jambs and lintels.
Mill Farmhouse; 53.33994°N 1.72646°W		Early 18th century	The farmhouse is in gritstone with quoins and a stone slate roof. There are two storeys and three bays. The central doorway has flush jambs and a lintel. Above it is a single-light window, and the other windows are two-light sashes with mullions.
Nether Cottage; 53.33747°N 1.70249°W		Mid 18th century	The cottage is in gritstone with quoins, and a stone slate roof with coped gables. There are two storeys and three bays. The central doorway has a chamfered surround, to the left is a single-light window, and the other windows are mullioned with two lights.
Brough Bridge; 53.34047°N 1.72540°W		1824	The bridge carries Stretfield Road (B6049 road) over the River Noe. It is in gritstone and consists of two segmental arches. The bridge has voussoirs, bands, semicircular cutwaters with datestones, and parapets with polygonal end piers.
