= Arnemetia =

Water deity

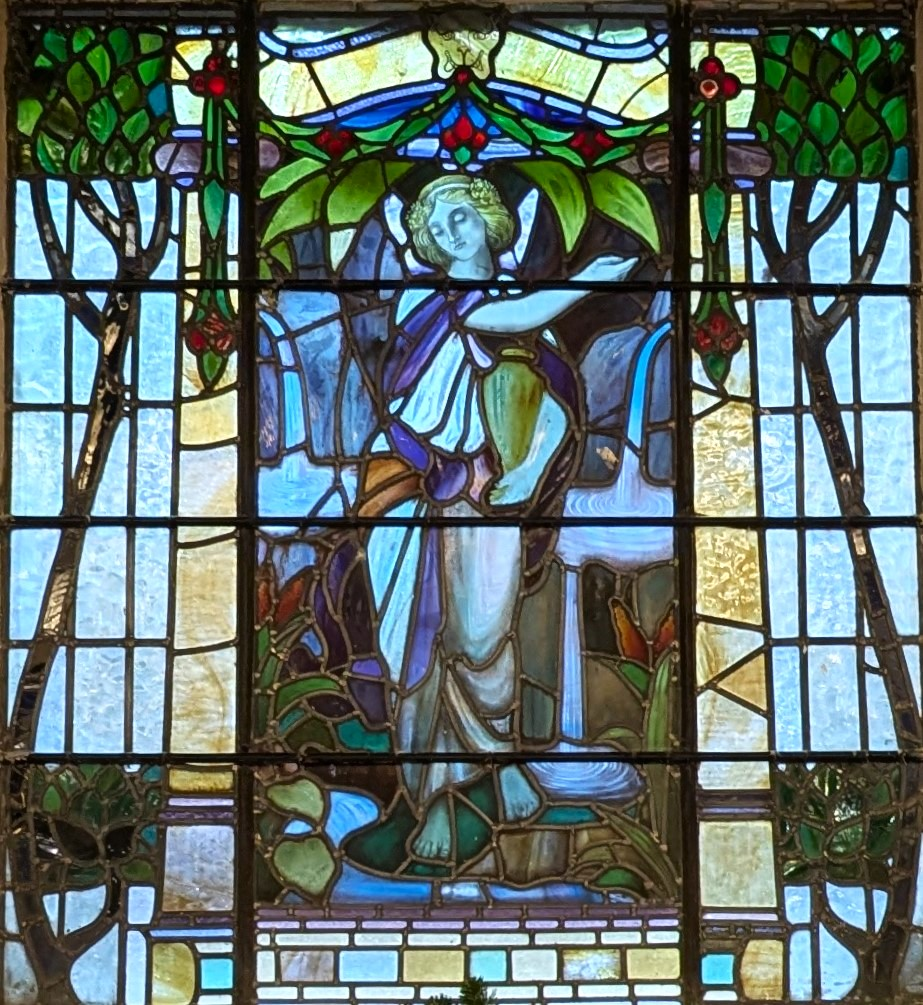
Stained glass window in the Pump Room at Buxton

Arnemetia is a goddess in Romano-British religion. Her shrine is at Aquae Arnemetiae ("waters of Arnemetia"), which is now Buxton in Derbyshire, England.

Arnemetia's name contains Celtic stems are ("against, beside") and nemeton ("sacred grove"). Her name is thus interpreted as "she who dwells in the sacred grove", suggesting Arnemetia may be a divine epithet rather than a name in its own right.
