= Doctor's Gate =

Roman Road between Glossop and the Hope Valley

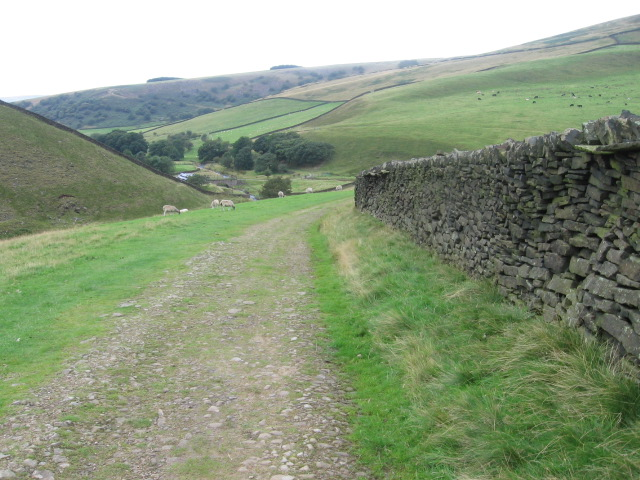
Doctor's Gate path east of Old Glossop

Doctor's Gate is a Roman road in the Derbyshire Peak District of England, which ran between Melandra fort at Glossop and Navio fort at Brough-on-Noe. Doctor's Gate was recorded in 1627 as "Docto Talbotes Gate", named after Dr John Talbot who is attributed with improving the summit section in the late 15th century and 'gate' is derived from the Scandinavian word for road.

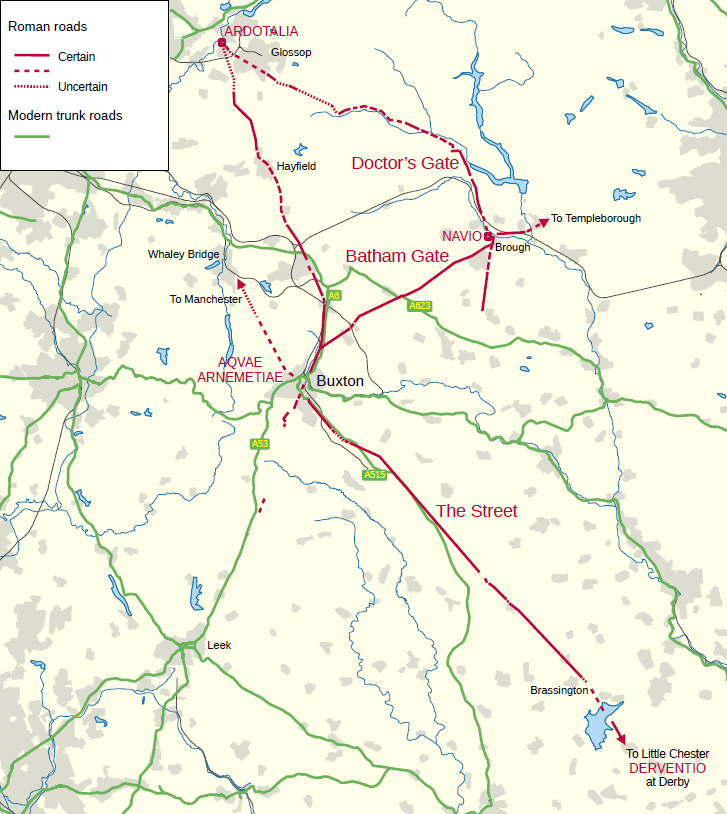
Roman Roads in the Peak District

The route of Doctor's Gate was investigated in the 1970s by Peter Wroe and Peter Mellor. The present-day path across the moors, which is marked on Ordnance Survey maps, was a medieval packhorse route and may deviate about 1 kilometre (0.6 mi) north of the actual course of the Roman road on Ashop Moor.

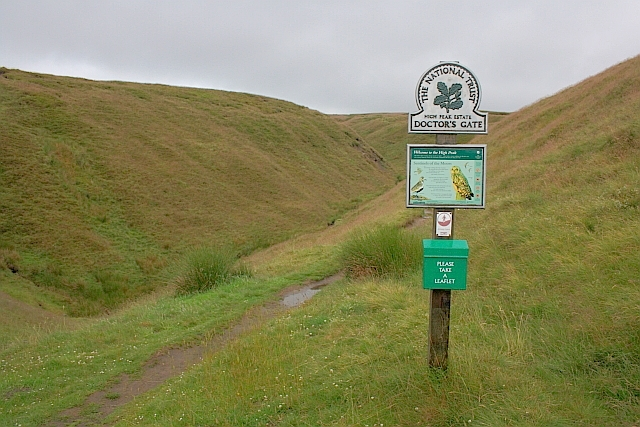
Culvert at A57

Four sections of the Doctor's Gate route are under the stewardship of the National Trust, within its Hope Woodlands property:

- Blackley Hey section: trackway through the Woodlands Valley north of Hope between Fulwood Stile Farm and the ford at Upper Ashop;
- Heyridge Farm section: path between Ashop Bridge and Oyster Clough;
- Lady Clough section: path between Oyster Cough (east of Snake Inn) and the Snake Pass;
- Summit section: paved routeway between Snake Pass (A57 road along the old Sheffield to Glossop turnpike from 1821) and just beyond the Pennine Way long-distance footpath.

Doctor's Gate Road was assigned the Margary number RR711 by Roman road historian Ivan Donald Margary, who commented that the road was "remarkably direct considering the very difficult country that the route has to traverse".
