= Oakwood Roman Fort and Camp =

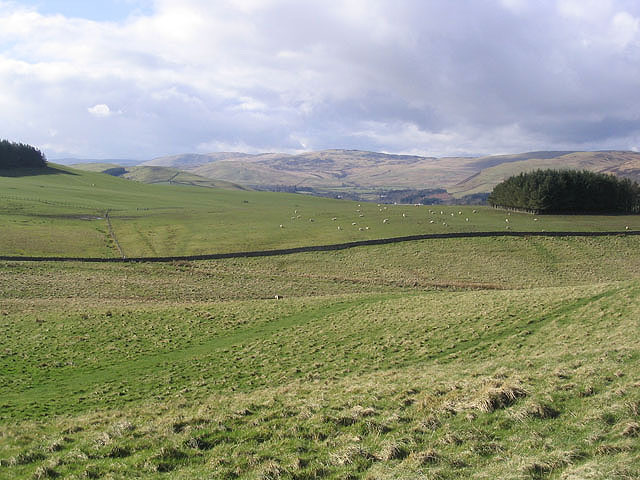
- Looking west towards the site of the Roman fort

- Location within Scottish Borders
- 55.5150°N 2.9126°W
- Periods: Roman Britain, 1st century AD
- Location: near Selkirk, Scottish Borders
- OS grid reference: NT 425 249

Site notes
- Excavation dates: 1951–1952

Scheduled monument
- Designated: 24 May 1955
- Reference no.: SM1726

Oakwood Roman Fort and Camp is a British archaeological site, a Roman fort and nearby Roman camp, about 3.5 miles (5.6 km) south-west of Selkirk in the Scottish Borders. The site is a scheduled monument.

== Description ==
The sites of the fort and adjacent temporary camp were discovered in 1949 from aerial photographs. Excavation of both sites took place in 1951–1952, and a report by K. A. Steer and R. W. Feachem was published in 1954.

=== Fort ===
The fort is on a small flat-topped knoll on the south side of the Ettrick Valley; there are good views to the north and west. The Eildon Hills, 9 miles (14 km) to the north-east, can be seen, near the site of the Roman fort at Newstead, so that communication by visual signals between the forts would have been possible.

Stratified pottery and a worn coin minted in 69–70 were found; these finds indicate the likely period of occupation, and phases of construction. The fort was probably occupied during the Flavian dynasty from about A.D. 81, when Gnaeus Julius Agricola, governor of Britannia, advanced into present-day lowland Scotland, until about A.D. 100, when it is known that troops were withdrawn, probably relating to preparations for Trajan's Dacian Wars.

The fort was square and occupied 3.5 acres (1.4 ha) within turf ramparts and two external ditches; this was a suitable size for a cohort (about 500 soldiers). There were four timber gates, each flanked by square towers. During the period of occupation the defences were renovated and strengthened.

=== Temporary camp ===
The temporary camp, at coordinates 55.5197°N 2.9125°W, is on a north-west facing slope north of the fort. It was approximately rectangular, 1,400 by 980 feet (430 by 300 m), covering 31 acres (13 ha). There was a rampart and ditch, and traces of two of the supposed four gates have been found. It was situated close to the fort rather than in the best defensive position, suggesting that its purpose was to provide accommodation for workers constructing the fort.

== See also ==
- Scotland during the Roman Empire
