= Lees Hall Roman Camp =

- Location within Northumberland
- 54°59′5.280″N 2°27′46.764″W
- Periods: Roman Britain
- Location: near Haltwhistle, Northumberland
- OS grid reference: NY 704 656

Scheduled monument
- Designated: 12 December 1928
- Reference no.: 1010934

Lees Hall Roman Camp is an archaeological site, a Roman camp near Hadrian's Wall, in Northumberland, England. It is near Haltwhistle and adjacent to the B6318 road.

== Description ==
The camp is one of over 40 temporary Roman camps recorded near Hadrian's Wall; they may have been marching camps, or were occupied by troops constructing the wall, or were used during military training. This camp is unusual in having an outwork surrounding the main defences, suggesting that it was used for more than one campaign season.

The camp, a scheduled monument, is about 1 kilometre (0.6 mi) south of Hadrian's Wall, and is 680 metres (2,230 ft) south of the Vallum. There are extensive views to the north and east; a small stream, running from west to east, lies within the fort.

It survives as earthworks and ditches; the rampart has an average height of 0.3 metres (1 ft 0 in) with an external ditch up to 0.4 metres (1 ft 4 in) deep. It is rectangular, measuring 203 metres (666 ft) west to east by 140 metres (460 ft) north to south, enclosing an area of 1.7 hectares (4.2 acres). There are four gateways, which are in the centre of the west and east side and offset to the east on the north and south sides, implying that the camp faced east.

The outwork surrounds the fort about 10 metres (33 ft) outside the main defences; its average height is 0.2 metres (7.9 in), with breaks opposite the gateways.
