= Navio Roman Fort =

Roman fort near Hope in Derbyshire, England

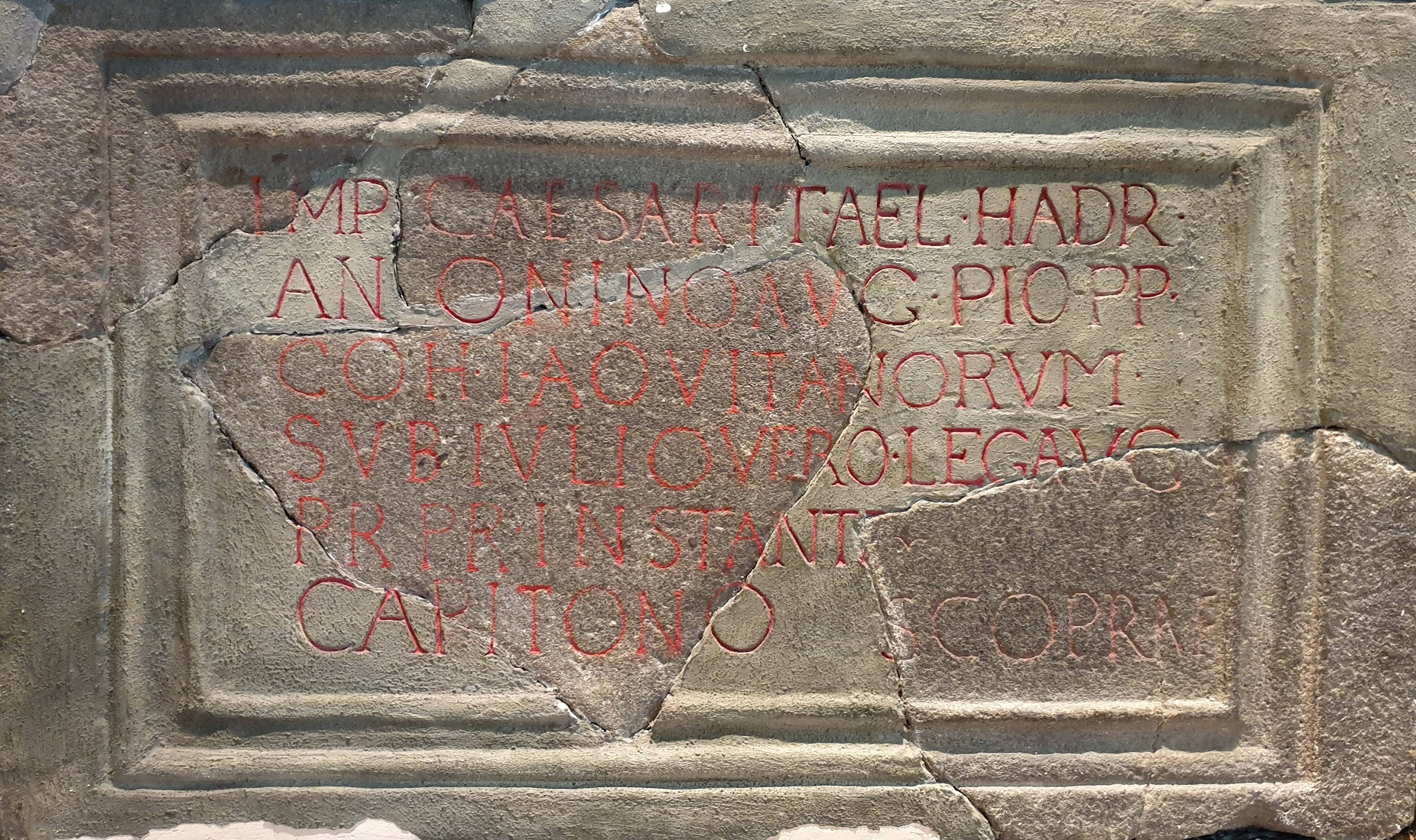
- Centurial Stone from Navio Roman Fort
- Interactive map of Navio Roman Fort
- 53°20′28″N 1°43′48″W
- Type: Fort (Castra)
- Periods: Roman Empire
- Location: Brough-on-Noe
- Region: Derbyshire, England

Site notes
- Condition: Buried remains
- Public access: Footpath

Scheduled monument
- Official name: Navio Roman fort and vicus
- Designated: 30 November 1925
- Reference no.: 1017505

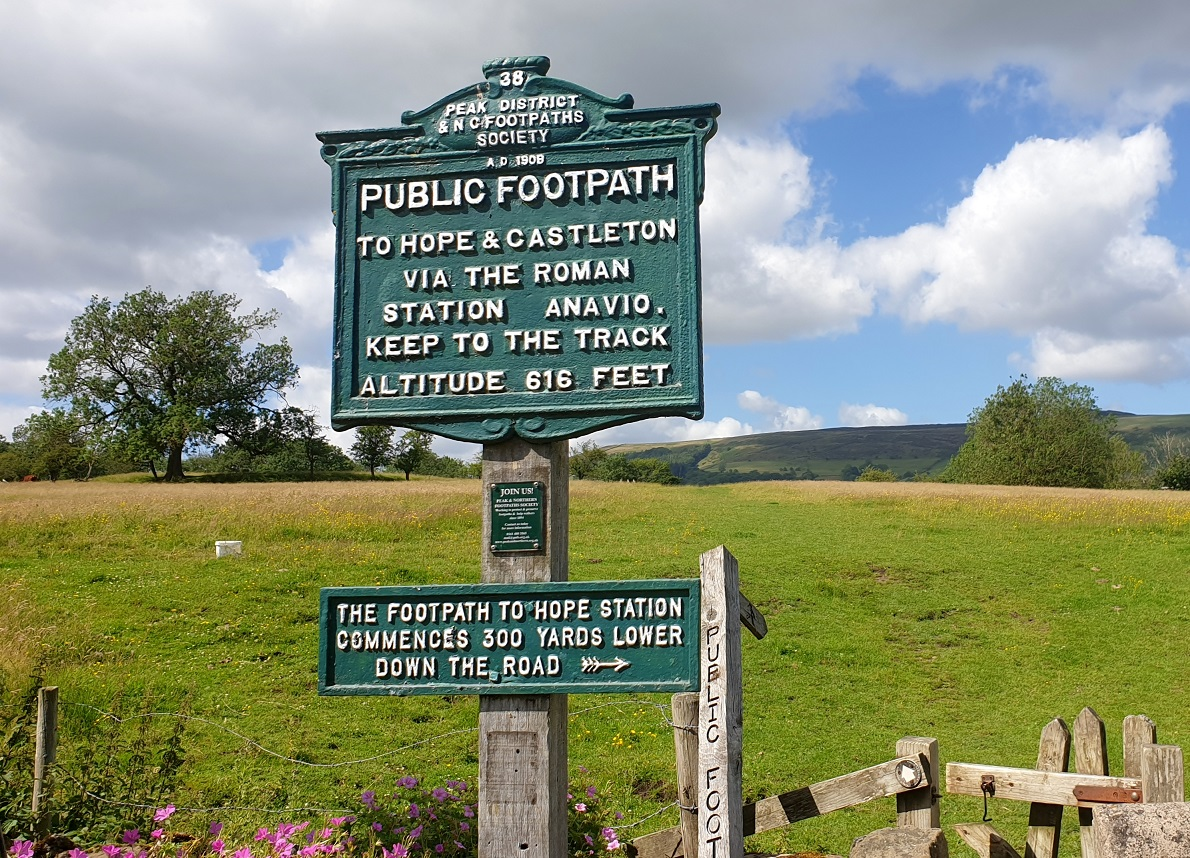
Footpath to 'Roman Station Anavio' at Batham Gate

Navio Roman fort overlooks a tight bend of the River Noe at Brough-on-Noe near Hope, Derbyshire, in England. Navio fort and vicus (civilian settlement) is a Scheduled Monument.

The town was recorded as Nauione in the Ravenna Cosmography's list of all known places in the world in about 700 AD. The entry is followed by places with which Navio had road connections: Aquis Arnemeza (Buxton), Zerdotalia (Ardotalia, later called Melandra fort, near Glossop) and Mantio (Manchester). There is also an entry for the river Anava, next to the river Dorvantium, which is considered to be the River Derwent.

A Roman milestone was discovered in 1862 in the Silverlands district of Buxton. It is the oldest inscribed milestone found in Derbyshire. The inscription is:

TRIB POT COS II P P A NAVIONE M P XI

which means ‘With the tribune's power, twice consul, father of this country. From Navio 11 miles.' The milestone is on display in the Buxton Museum. Navio is Latin for "on the river". The Roman name of the fort Navio was later changed to the Old English word for fort, brough. Excavations in the 1930s by Sir Ian Richmond and J.P. Gillam established the locations of the perimeters of successive forts on the same site. Navio fort was originally about 3 acres (1.2 ha) in size and built of timber and earthworks around 80 CE. It was rebuilt in stone in a rectangular form (about 90 by 105 metres (295 by 344 ft)) around 150 CE from when it was occupied for over 200 years. It was subsequently rebuilt and altered and in use until around 350 CE. The site of the fort now consists of earthwork banks and ditches around an earthen platform, buried remains and a few exposed stone slabs. Earlier excavations in 1903 by John Garstang uncovered steps into an underground stone-walled chamber below the Principia or headquarters building. A large Centurial stone and a gritstone altar were found in the fort's strong room. They are on display in the Buxton Museum.

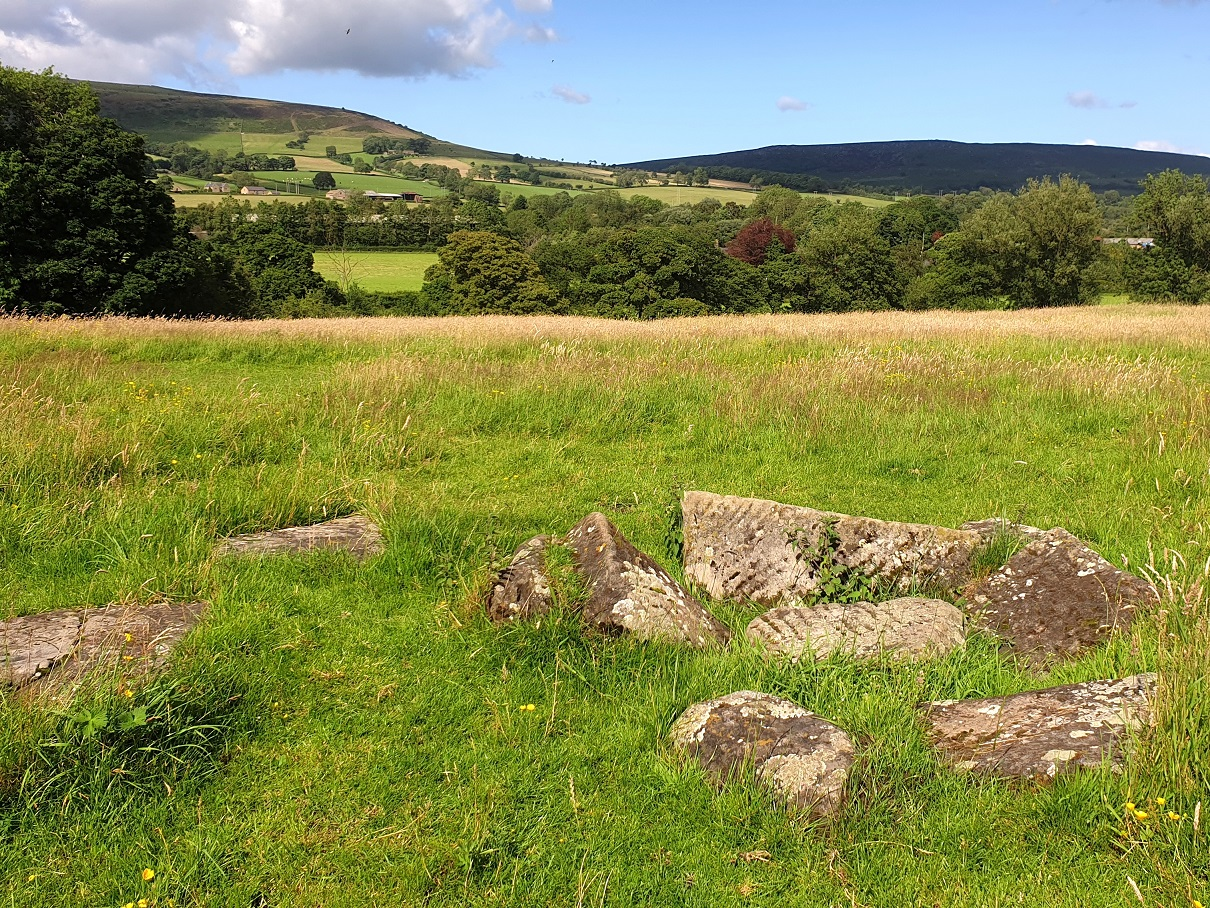
Site of Navio Roman Fort at Brough-on-Noe

The Centurial stone found at Navio dates from the rebuilding of the fort in 154 CE by occupying soldiers from southwest France. The inscription on it reads:

IMP CAESARI T AEL HADR ANTONINO AVG PIO P P COH I AQVITANORVM SVB IVLIO VERO LEG AVG PR PR INSTANTE CAPITONO SCO PRAE

This translates as: "The 1st Cohort of Aquitanians under Julius Verus, the Emperor’s Governor of Britain, under the instructions of Capitonius Fuscus, Prefect of the Cohort, erected this stone in honour of the Emperor Caesar Titus Aelius Hadrianus Antoninus Augustus Pius, Father of his Country." The gritsone altar is dedicated to the goddess Arnemetia (or Arnomecta), who dwelt in the sacred waters at Buxton, and is inscribed with:

DEAE ARNOMECTE AEL MOTIO V S L L M

This translates as: "To the Goddess Arnomecta, Aelius Motio gladly, willingly and deservedly fulfilled his vow."

The fort guarded the Doctor's Gate route northwest to the larger fort of Melandra (near Glossop), the Portway road to the south and the Batham Gate road (between the fort at Templeborough and the Roman spa town of Aquae Arnemetiae, modern-day Buxton). This was an important route for access to sites of lead production in the Peak District.

In the 1980s geophysical surveys identified the extent of the vicus (settlement adjoining the fort) to the south and east of the fort. Excavations in the 1990s determined that the vicus extended further east beyond Bradwell Brook. In 2019 excavations of the vicus uncovered foundations from stone and timber buildings. The team also found many pottery fragments, carved stone pieces, coins and a ‘ballista ball’ (ammunition for a large missile-throwing device). In 1929 a denarius (a silver coin) of Vespasian's sixth consulate (AD 75) was found nearby at Hope Cement Works.

== See also ==
- List of Roman sites in the Peak District
