= Ardotalia =

Roman fort in Gamesley, near Glossop in Derbyshire, England

- Melandra Castle
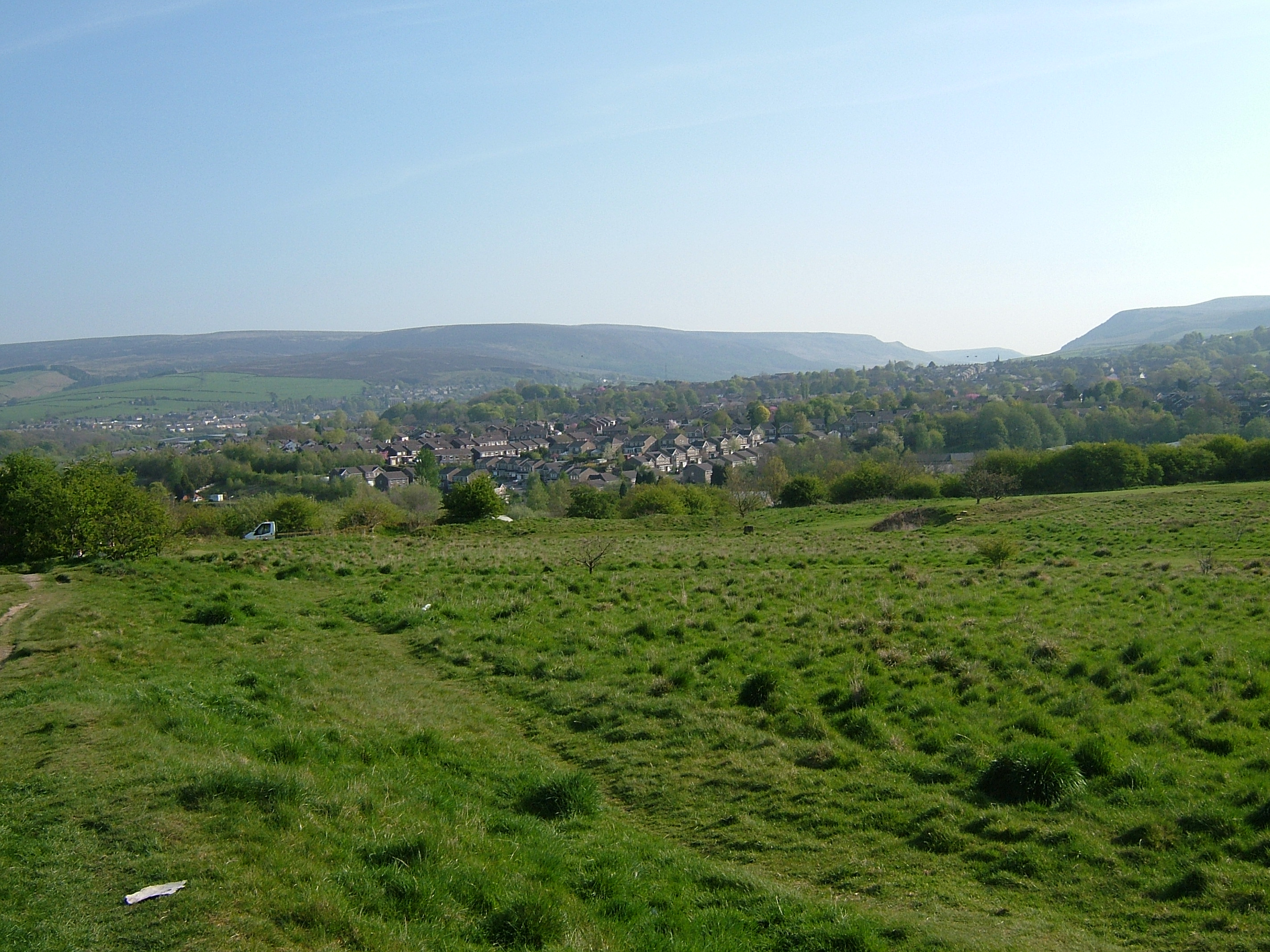
- The fort today looking towards Longdendale

- Map showing the location of Ardotalia within Derbyshire.
- 53°27′09″N 1°59′17″W
- Type: Roman fort
- Associated with: 3rd Cohort of Bracara Augustani
- Location: High Peak, Derbyshire
- Region: East Midlands

History
- Built: Cohors Primae Frisiavonum—The First Cohort of Frisiavones

Scheduled monument
- Official name: Melandra Castle Roman fort
- Reference no.: 1004595

Ardotalia (from British Celtic for "high dark hill"), also known as Melandra or Melandra Castle, is a Roman fort in Gamesley, near Glossop in Derbyshire, England.

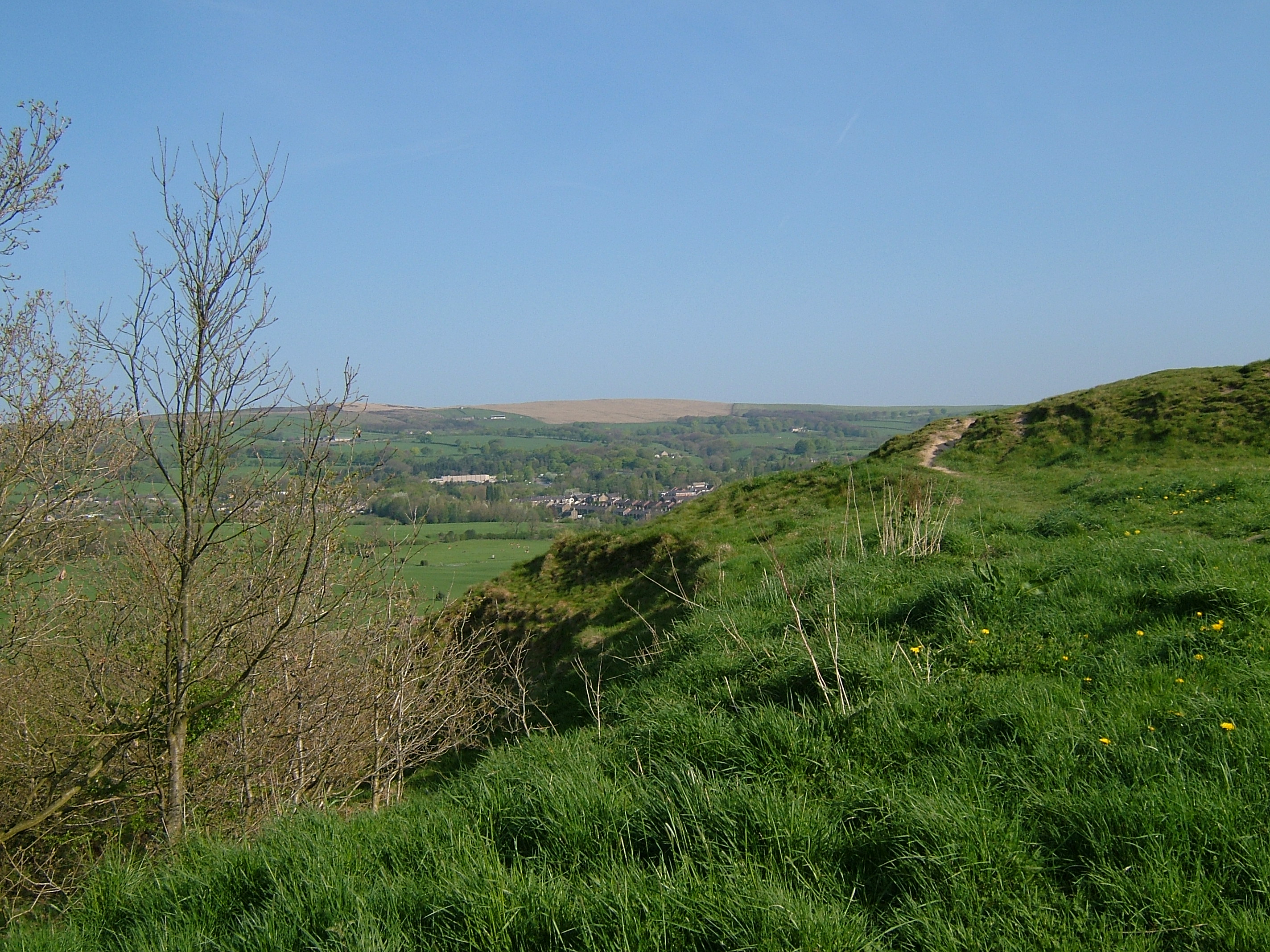
The western ramparts

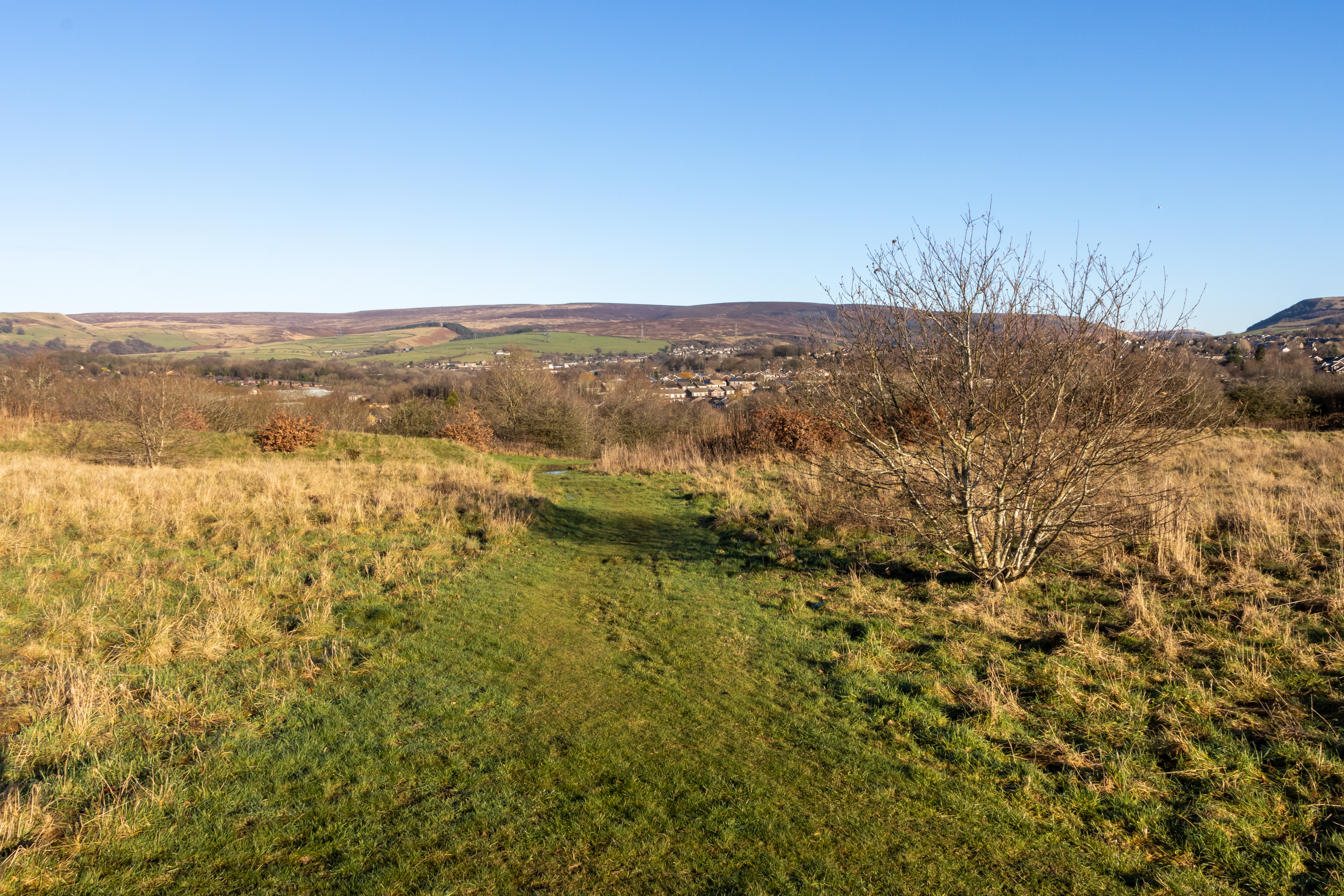
Track through the centre of the fort

Ardotalia was constructed by Cohors Primae Frisiavonum—The First Cohort of Frisiavones. Evidence for the existence of this unit exists not only from the building stone found at the site but also from various diplomas and other Roman writings. This unit would have had around a thousand men, including the specialist craftsmen needed to perform the skilled work of building the fort.

This unit was assisted in constructing the fort by the 3rd Cohort of Bracara Augustani. These men were probably Iberian Celts from the colony of Braga in Portugal, who seem to have been attached to the XX Legion Valeria Victrix in Chester.

Whilst it is unknown which of these Cohorts manned the fort, it seems more likely that the 3rd Cohort of Bracara Augustani performed this duty, as they were from a hilly region and so were more experienced in holding terrain such as that found around Glossop. The Frisiavones were from low-lying lands beyond the Rhine and so may have been divided between the lower terrain of Manchester and Northwich.

The First Cohort of Frisiavones were also present at Brocolitia, one of Hadrian's wall forts and settlements, at Carrawburgh, Northumberland. Evidence for this relies on an inscription on an altar stone, which tells us that Optio Maus (an NCO within the Cohort) had repaid a vow to the goddess Coventina. Whether this altar was the repayment of the vow is unknown.

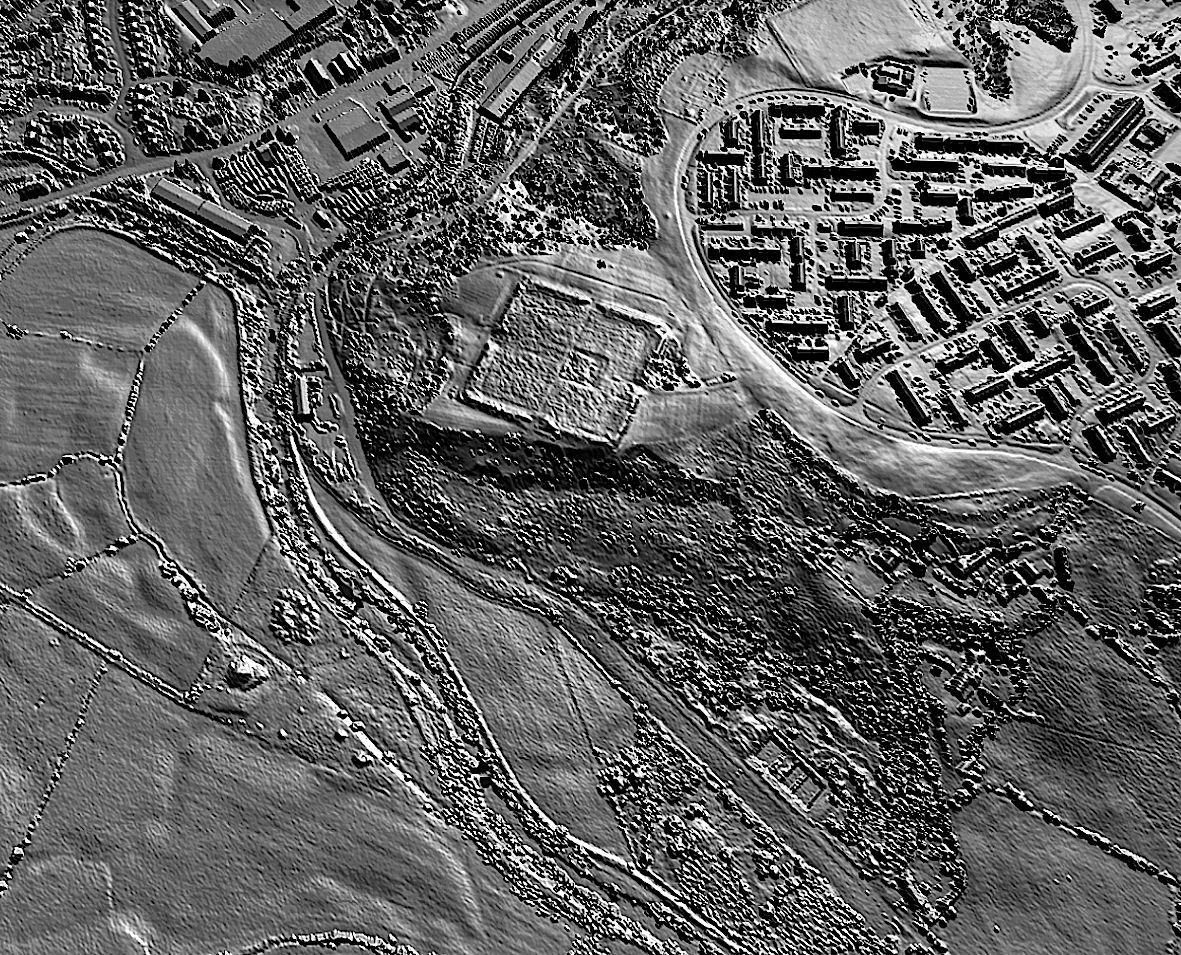
A lidar view of the fort.

The name Melandra is of unknown origin but may have been originated by the John Watson, Rector of Stockport, who visited the site c. 1771 when substantial stone remains existed. The name Ardotalia is a hypothetical emendation of Zerdotalia written in the Ravenna Cosmography. The fort was excavated in the late 1800s. The towers were described by Charles Roeder: "They are built square and stand detached, 4 feet away from the angles, measuring 10 feet by 11 feet, the walls being 3 feet thick."

An excavation by Hamnett and Garstang was further described by Roeder, reporting:

"Two sides ditched, the other sides naturally defended, standing on sharp slopes. Still awaiting excavation."

"Walls, 4 feet thick, composed of large boulder embedded in clay, with three courses of flagstones on the top, the outer face is of dressed stones 12 inches thick, 12 to 21 inches in length, the inner portion filled up with large boulders, clay and gravel; no inner wall has been discovered."
"Road: the principal road, 13 feet wide, of gravel, with boulder curbstone outside; from near the south-west tower, a gravel road, 9 feet wide, runs to a small plateau in the adjoining field."
"Gates placed as at Ribchester; gateway double-arched; at the P. P. Dextra was a portcullis."
"Conduit, from P. P. Sinistra to the north-west tower, flagged."
"Towers: four detached corner towers; near south angle, an oven."
"Prætorium and complex of buildings adjoining: prætorium (inner wall, 2 feet; outer wall, 3 feet), 25 feet square, three rooms excavated partially, the middle one has its floor of broken bricks and the other two of flagstones; the tile floor of granary, of tiles 8, 9, and 10 inches square, 2 inches thick; been repaired with roofing tile."
"Shape, rectangular, rounded; walls, 122 yards by 112 yards=3⅛ acres; midway between the P. P. Dextra and the Decumana entrances is the Corn Mill; the floor of a workshop to the right of the road from the Decumana to the Prætorium."
"Pottery, chiefly second century, also fragments of first century."

"Coins from Domitian (81–96), Hadrian (117–138)."

— Roman Manchester (1900)

The site is a Scheduled Ancient Monument. As of 2020, it is on the Heritage at Risk Register, its condition described as "[g]enerally unsatisfactory with major localised problems".

Doctor's Gate is a track connecting Ardotalia and Navio fort at Brough-on-Noe. It was formerly believed to be a Roman road and signage still exists to this effect

== See also ==
- List of Roman sites in the Peak District
