= Aquae Arnemetiae =

Town in Roman Britain on the site of Buxton, England

Coordinates: 53°15′32″N 1°54′54″W

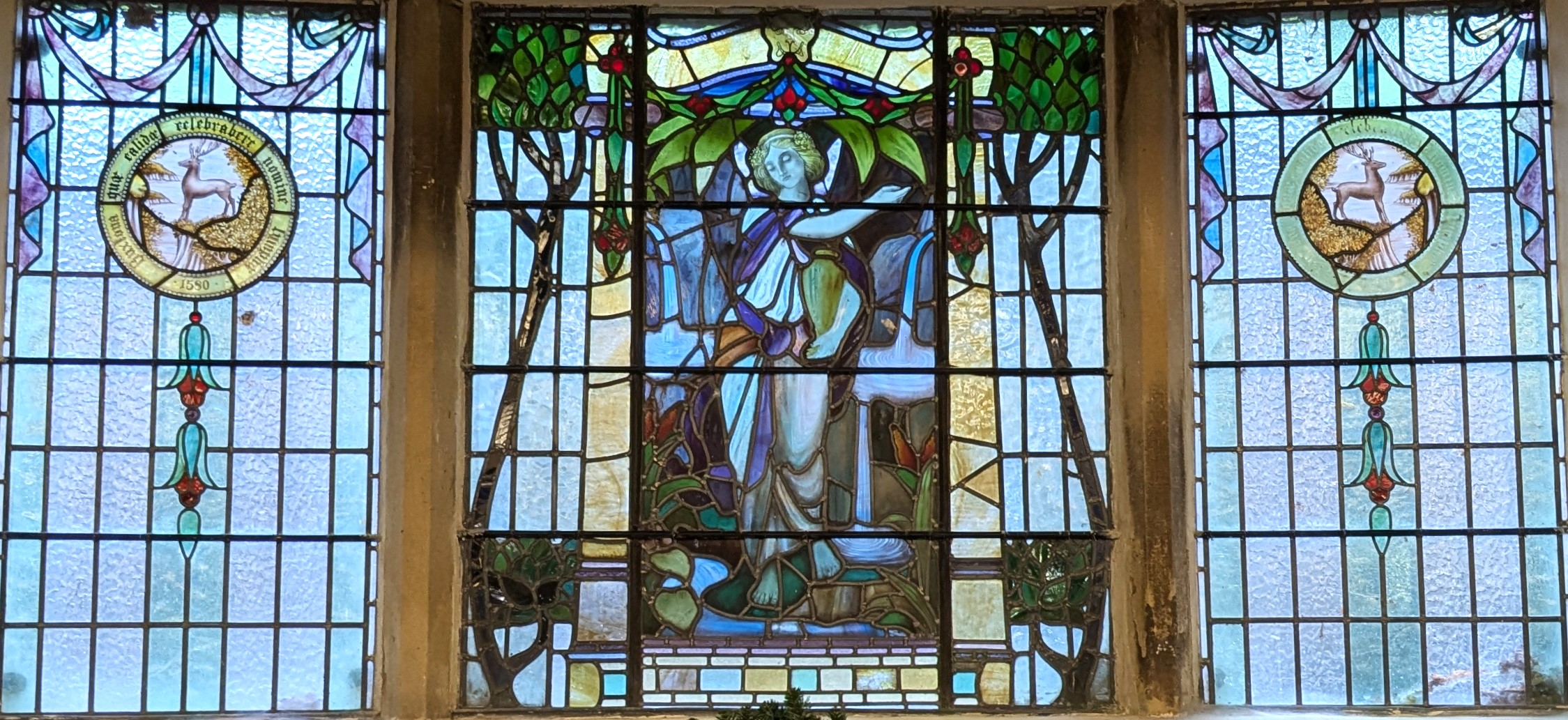
Arnemetia in the stained glass window in the Pump Room

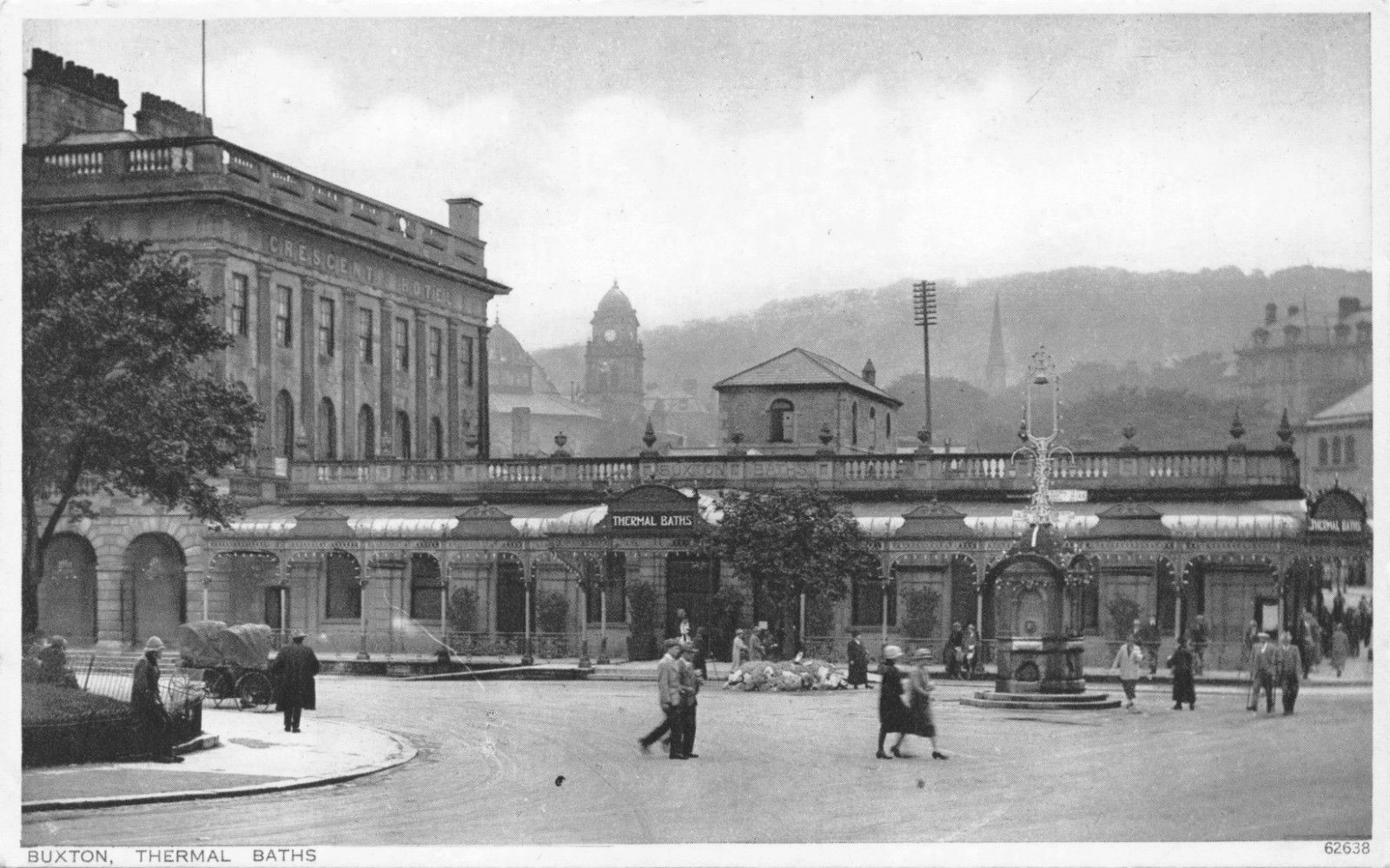
Buxton Thermal Baths in early 20th-century

Aquae Arnemetiae was a small town in the Roman province of Britannia. The settlement was based around its natural warm springs. The Roman occupation ran from around 50 AD to 410 AD. Today it is the town of Buxton, Derbyshire in England.

Aquae Arnemetiae means 'Waters of Arnemetia'. Arnemetia was the Romano-British goddess of the sacred grove (the name Arnemetia was derived from the Celtic for beside the sacred grove). The town was recorded as Aquis Arnemeza in the Ravenna Cosmography's list of all known places in the world in about 700 AD. The entry is between places with which the town had road connections: Nauione (Navio Roman fort at Brough), Zerdotalia (Ardotalia, later called Melandra fort, near Glossop) and Mantio (Manchester).

== Roman settlement ==
=== Baths ===
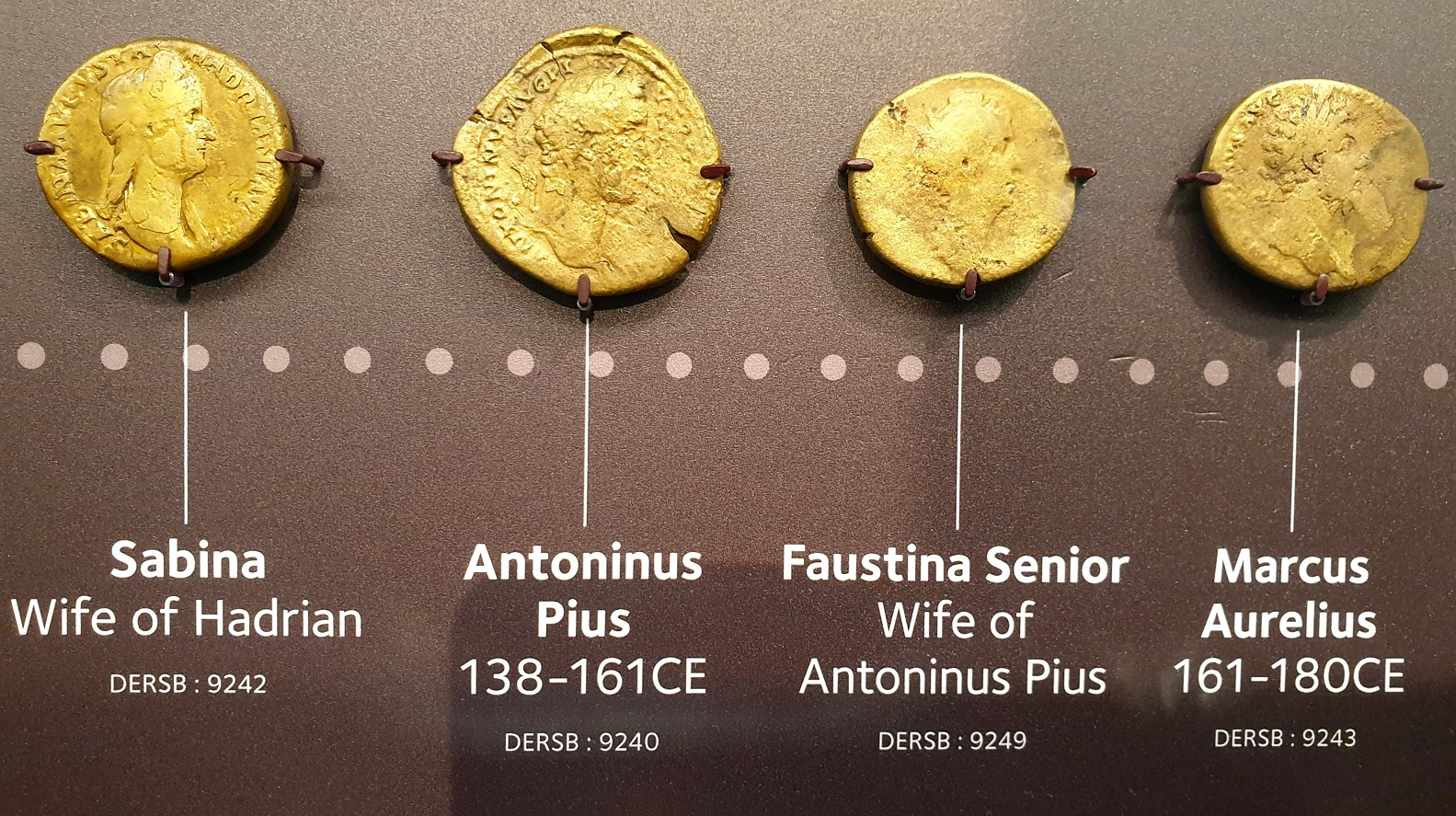
Roman coins from the Buxton Hoard found in 1979

Aquae Arnemetiae and Aquae Sulis (modern town of Bath in Somerset) were the only two Roman bath towns in Britain. The Romans built a bath at the location of the main thermal spring. In the late 17th-century Cornelius White operated bathing facilities at the hot spring at the site of the Buxton Old Hall. In 1695 he discovered an ancient smooth stone bath (20m long by 7m wide) as well as a lead cistern (2m square) on an oak timber frame. When the Crescent hotel was built on the site in 1780, a Roman bath was identified and described as ‘a leaden cistern'. The bath is now buried beneath the Crescent, next to the Natural Mineral Baths building that was constructed next to the hotel. Near to the site of the main spring, excavations in 2005 revealed the entry passage and doorways to the Roman baths. During this construction work, a wall believed to be the side of a palaestra (exercise hall) was also uncovered. Between 2009 and 2012 further underground cisterns and a large iron cauldron were revealed.

The main spring was excavated in the 1970s and a hoard of 232 Roman coins was found, spanning 300 years of the Roman occupation of Britain. Coins would have been thrown into the sacred waters to seek the favour of the Gods. The coins and pieces of bronze jewellery found with them are on display in the Buxton Museum.

The geothermal spring rises from about 1 km below ground and about a million litres of water flow out per day. The mineral water emerges at a steady 27 °C. Analysis of the water has indicated that it has a high magnesium content and that it originated around 5,000 years ago.

=== Town ===
Emperor Hadrian may have visited the town in 122 AD on his way to Wroxeter (Shrewsbury). In 1787 Major Hayman Rooke uncovered a long section of the Roman town wall, which is now beneath the landscaped hillside of The Slopes. At the same time Rooke also documented details of the base of a temple in the same area, overlooking the site of the baths and springs (between the present war memorial and meteorological station). The temple was dedicated to the water deity Arnemetia. It had a shrine room set on a rectangular podium, with a columned portico at the front. The Roman floor plan of a macellum (covered market with a central atrium) and floor mosaics were documented in 1860, on the west side of Buxton's market place near Fountain Street.

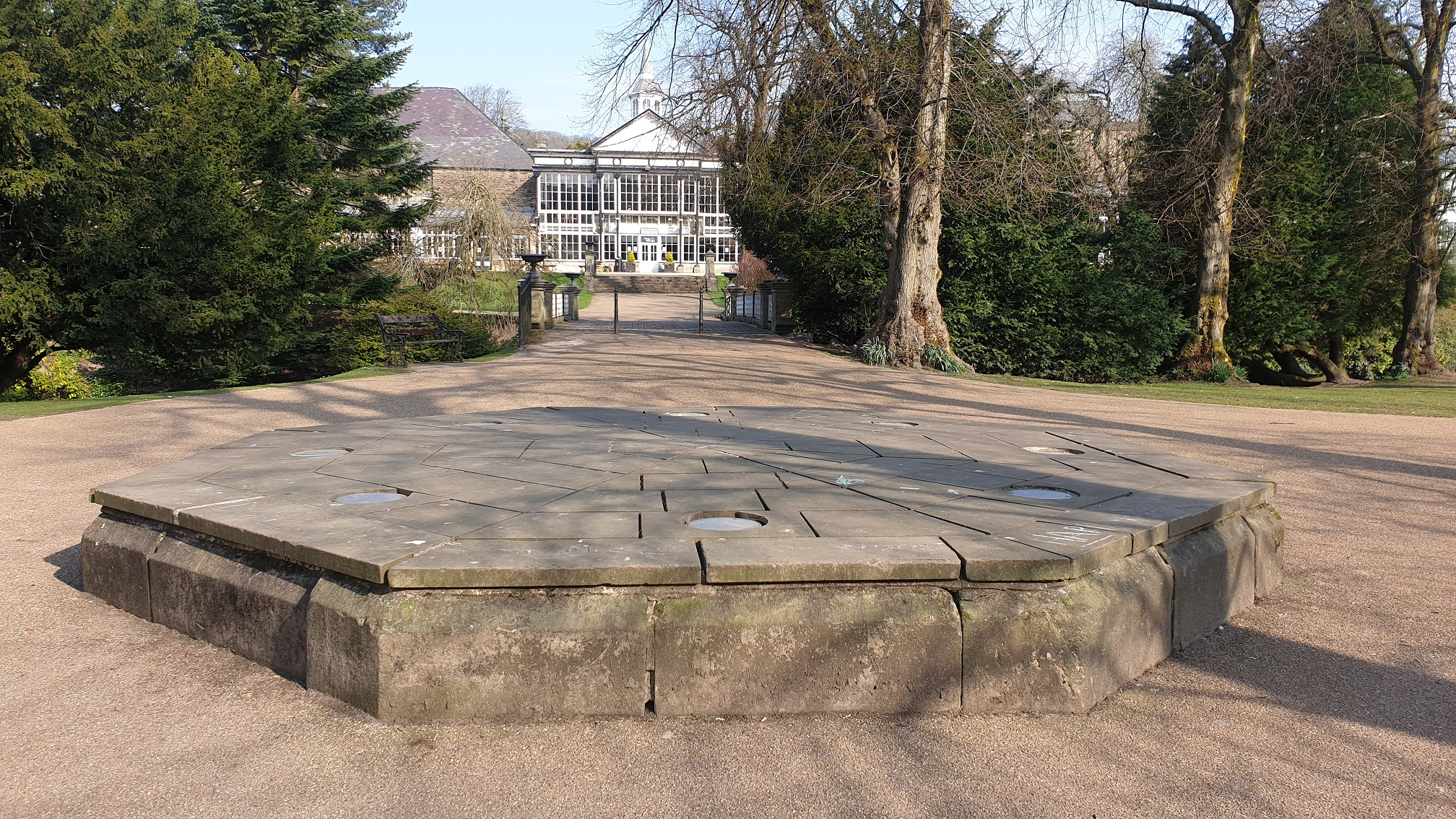
Octagonal base of Temple of Apona

An ancient Celtic temple, at the site of the Bath Gardens, was described in 1755 as having an octagonal base and a feint inscription appearing as 'Aeona'. It was concluded that the temple was dedicated to either Epona (goddess of horses) or more appropriately Apona (goddess of healing waters). When Edward Milner remodelled the Pavilion Gardens in 1871 the 2,000 year-old temple was demolished and only the base now remains.

One mile south of the town there was a Roman farm at Staden. Excavations in the 1980s found the platforms of several buildings, walls, enclosure banks, quern grinding stones, pottery, animal bones and jewellery. The potter's stamp of Sepuminus dates the pottery to 100-130 AD. A hypocaust tile found in the farm house demonstrates that it had an underfloor heating system.

=== Remains ===
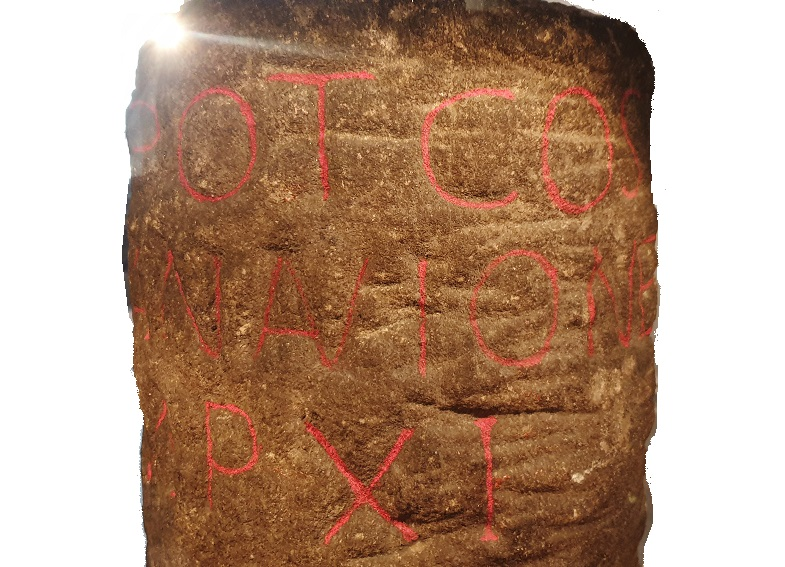
Inscription on Roman milestone found at Silverlands, Buxton

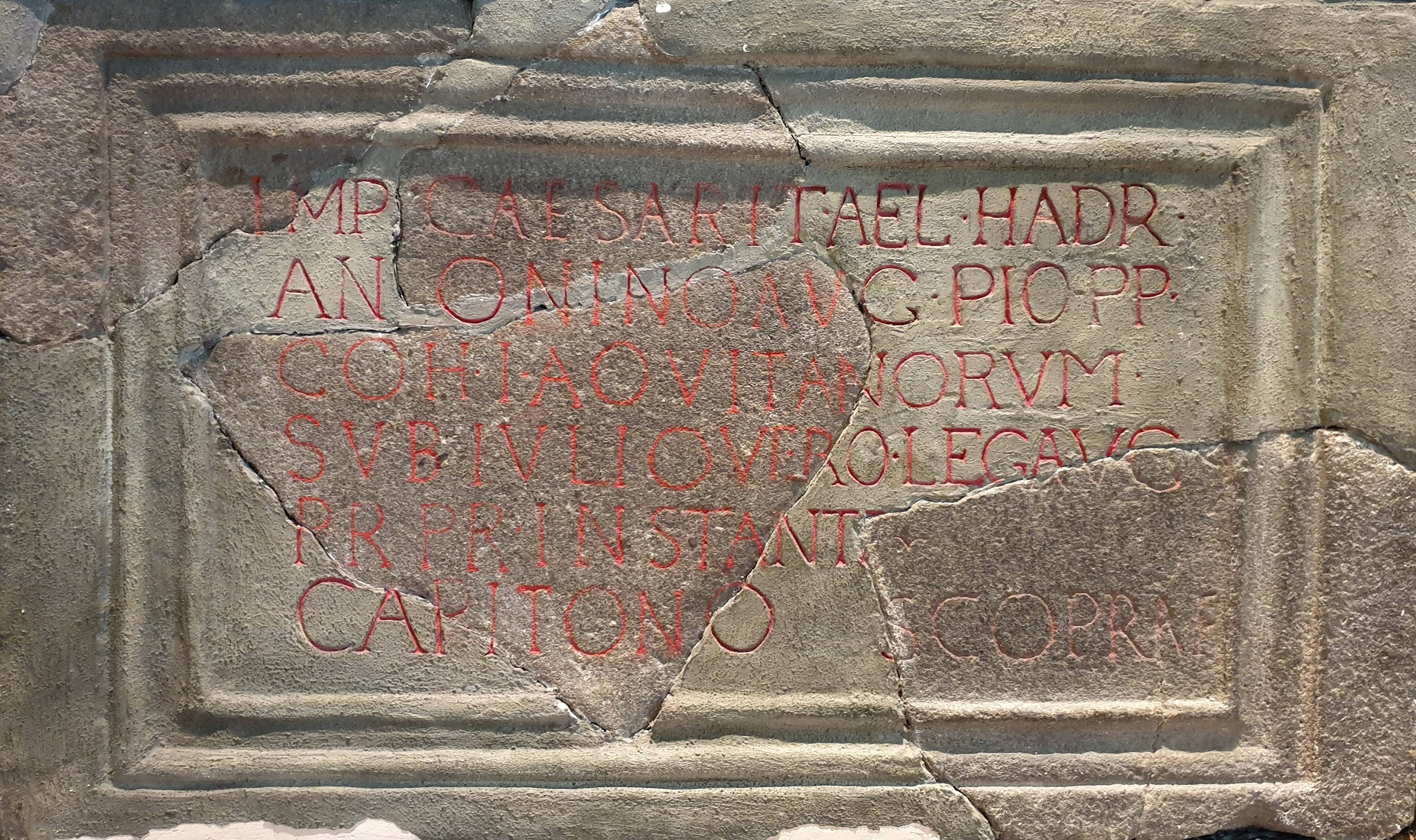
Centurial Stone from Navio Roman Fort

A Roman milestone was discovered in 1862 in the Silverlands district of Buxton. It is the oldest inscribed milestone found in Derbyshire. The inscription is ‘TRIB POT COS II P P A NAVIONE M P XI’ which means ‘With the tribune's power, twice consul, father of this country. From Navio 11 miles.' The site of the Navio Roman fort is by the present day village of Brough. In 1903, excavations by local archaeologist Micah Salt in the Silverlands area found various Roman artefacts including a silver coin, tiles, leather sandals, gritstone hearths, glassware and many fragments of fine Samian pottery. Pottery inscriptions indicate that they were made in 60-100 AD and from Verulamium (modern St Albans). The milestone and the other Roman items are on display in the Buxton Museum.

Numerous Roman remains were also discovered in 1811 on the site of Buxton's Town Hall, when it was built at the north end of the market place. Close to the Town Hall, Roman floor slabs were found in the cellar of 3 Hall Bank in 2006 and large Roman masonry is exposed in 8A Hall Bank.

Roman coins and Romano-British bronze jewellery were also found in nearby Poole's Cavern in 1865.

A gritstone altar dedicated to Arnemetia (Arnomecta) was found in 1903 in the strong room of Navio fort's Principia (headquarters building). The inscription on the altar says "To the goddess Arnomecta, Aelius Motio gladly, willingly, and deservedly fulfilled his vow." The altar is also on display in the Buxton Museum.

== Surroundings ==
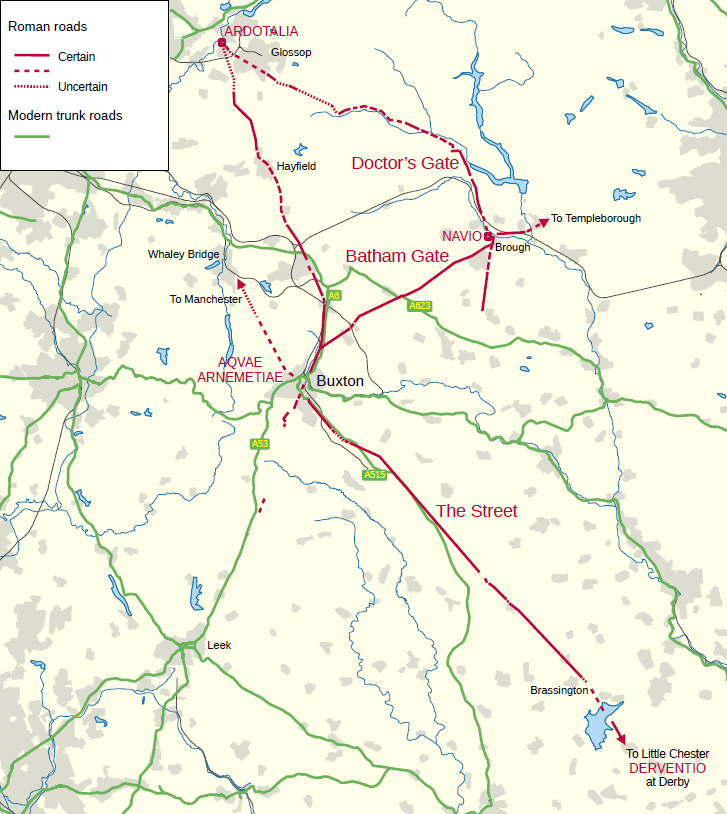
Roman Roads in the Peak District

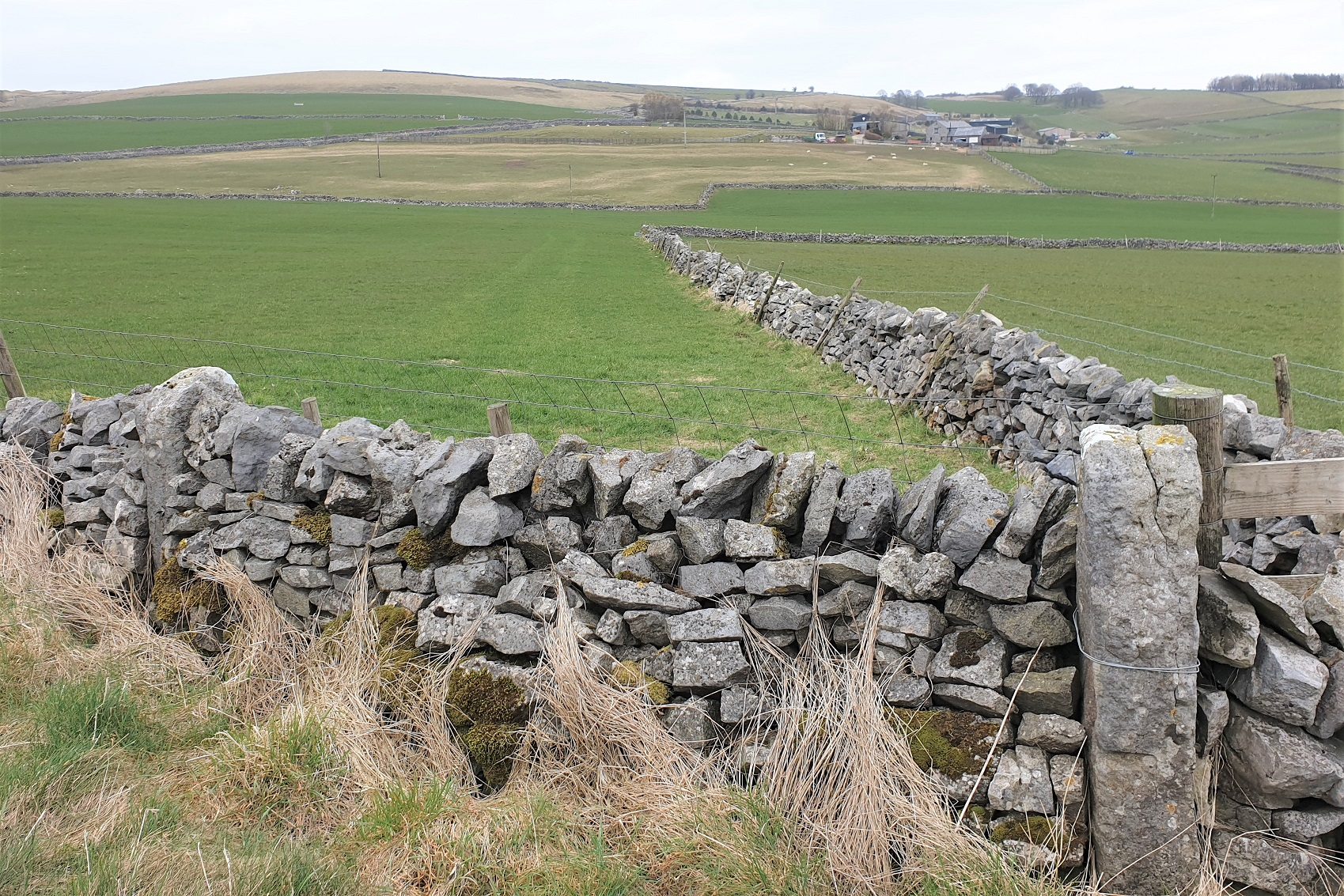
Route of Batham Gate Road near Peak Forest

Aquae Arnemetiae was at the intersection of two main Roman roads: Batham Gate and The Street. Batham Gate (Old English for "road to the bath town") is a Roman road from Templebrough Roman fort in South Yorkshire past Navio Roman Fort and onto Buxton. Part of the route of this old Roman road on Tideswell Moor is a protected Scheduled Monument. This was an important route for access to sites of lead production in the Peak District. There is still a road called Batham Gate road heading east out of Buxton. The Street road (Margary Number 71a) from Derventio (Derby) ran to Aquae Arnemetiae, followed in places today by the modern A515 road to the south of Buxton. The Street is still the name of the road in the Upper Goyt Valley that may have connected Buxton with Condate (Roman Northwich). There is plaque in a stone wall by The Street road near Arbor Low (at OS map location SK 1649 6232). It is marked "Aquae Armentiae Derventio" indicating the Buxton to Little Chester (Derby) Roman road. It is further inscribed: "Huius viae curam curatores viarum non susceperunt". This translates as "The road menders have not taken care of this road". Roman roads also led north to Mamucium (Manchester) and to Melandra fort, near Glossop (Margary Number 71b). Sections of agger from these two northbound rounds have been identified and excavated. There was also a Roman Road (Margary Number 713) between Buxton and Leek (which may be the Roman town of Chesterton) whose course joins the present A53 road towards Leek at Morridge Top.

The convergence of roads upon Aquae Arnemetiae, led Edward Tristram in 1916 to deduce the possible location of a fort in the town to the south of the market place by the current Bath Road.

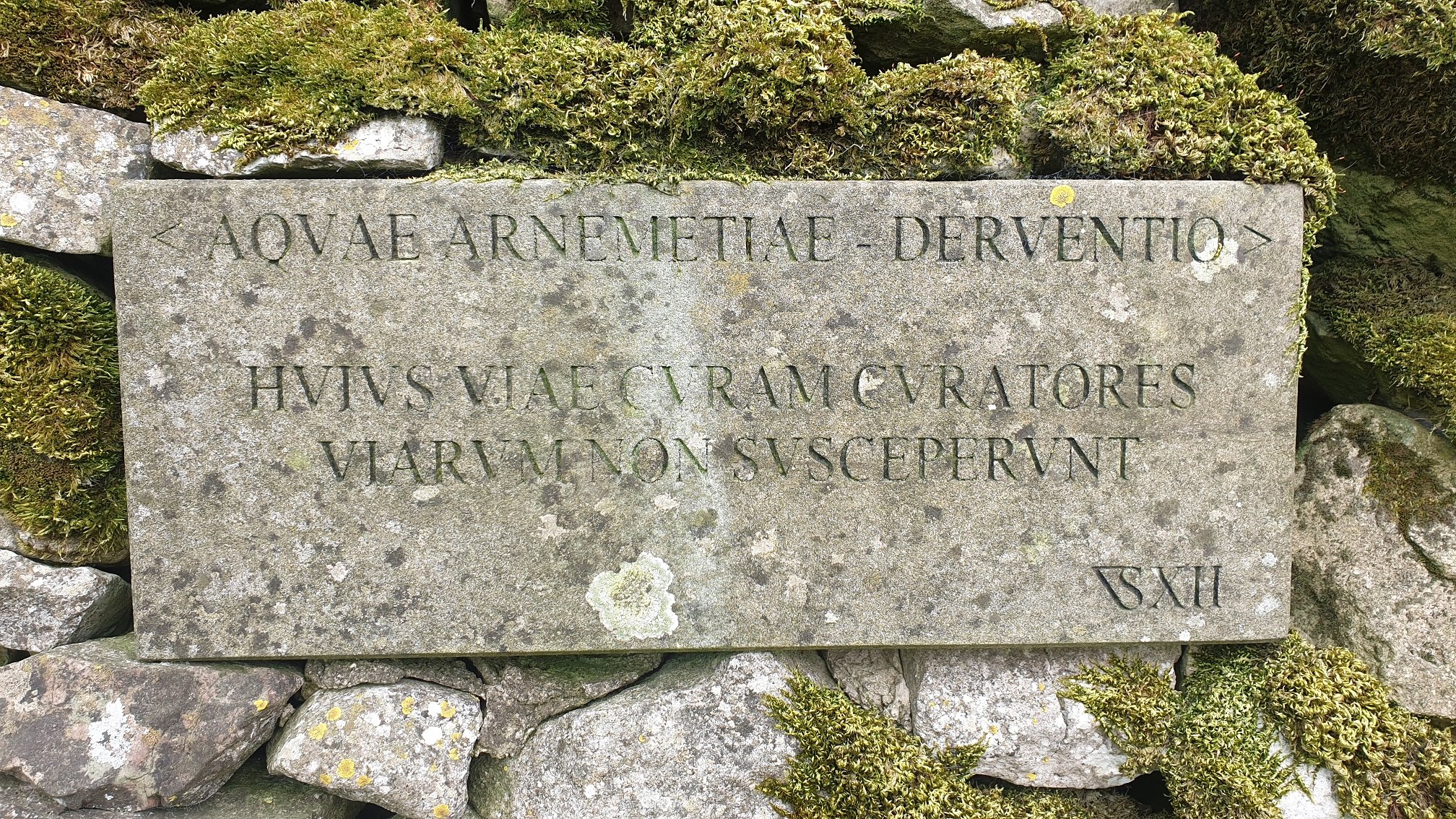
Plaque by Buxton to Derby Roman Road

Navio fort guarded the route northwest to the larger fort of Melandra. The large inscribed Centurial stone found at Navio in 1903 dates from the rebuilding of the fort in 154 BC by occupying soldiers from southwest France. The Centurial stone is on display in the Buxton Museum.

OS maps still mark Buxton with its Roman name of Aquae Arnemetiae.

== See also ==
- List of Roman sites in the Peak District
