= Batham Gate =

Roman road in Derbyshire, England

Coordinates: 53.2809°N 1.8851°W

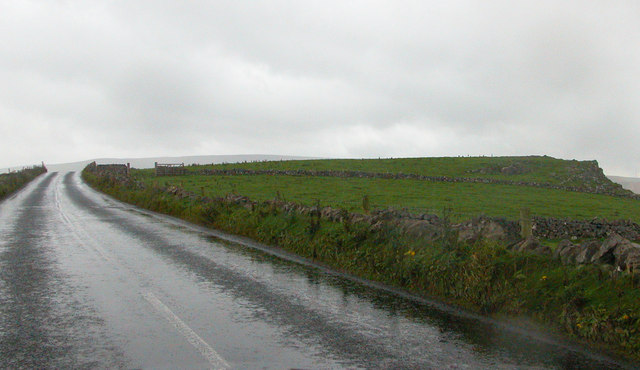
Batham Gate: the modern road follows the line of the Roman road near Laughman Tor

Batham Gate is the medieval name for a Roman road in Derbyshire, England, which ran south-west from Templebrough on the River Don in South Yorkshire to Brough-on-Noe (Latin Navio) and the spa town of Buxton (Latin Aquae Arnemetiae) in Derbyshire. Gate means "road" in northern English dialects; the name therefore means "road to the bath town".

The route of the road from Templebrough to the Roman signal station Navio is disputed. Hunter suggested the Long Causeway at Redmires as the route and it was shown as such on Ordnance Survey maps, but this is now known to be a medieval packhorse saltway.

Roman road historian Ivan Donald Margary said that the Long Causeway had a slightly different route in Roman times. In his book Roman Roads In Britain he said that evidence is now available that shows that after the Redmires Reservoir the Roman road did not follow the medieval route to Stanedge Pole but kept to the line of the present-day track to Stanedge Lodge. The Roman road then descended Stanage Edge half a mile north-west of the present route, on a narrow and steeper terrace. Batham Gate Road was assigned the Margary number RR710a.

Another possible route, backed by excavations carried out in 2016, suggests a route that would have taken the road close to the Roman villa at Whirlow Hall Farm. An interim report by University of Sheffield staff on excavations of a linear feature in the Sheephill Road area of Ringinglow has suggested this as the route of the lost Roman road. The feature, which extends through Barber Fields, is 20m wide and filled to a depth of 5m with rubble and has a metalled surface.

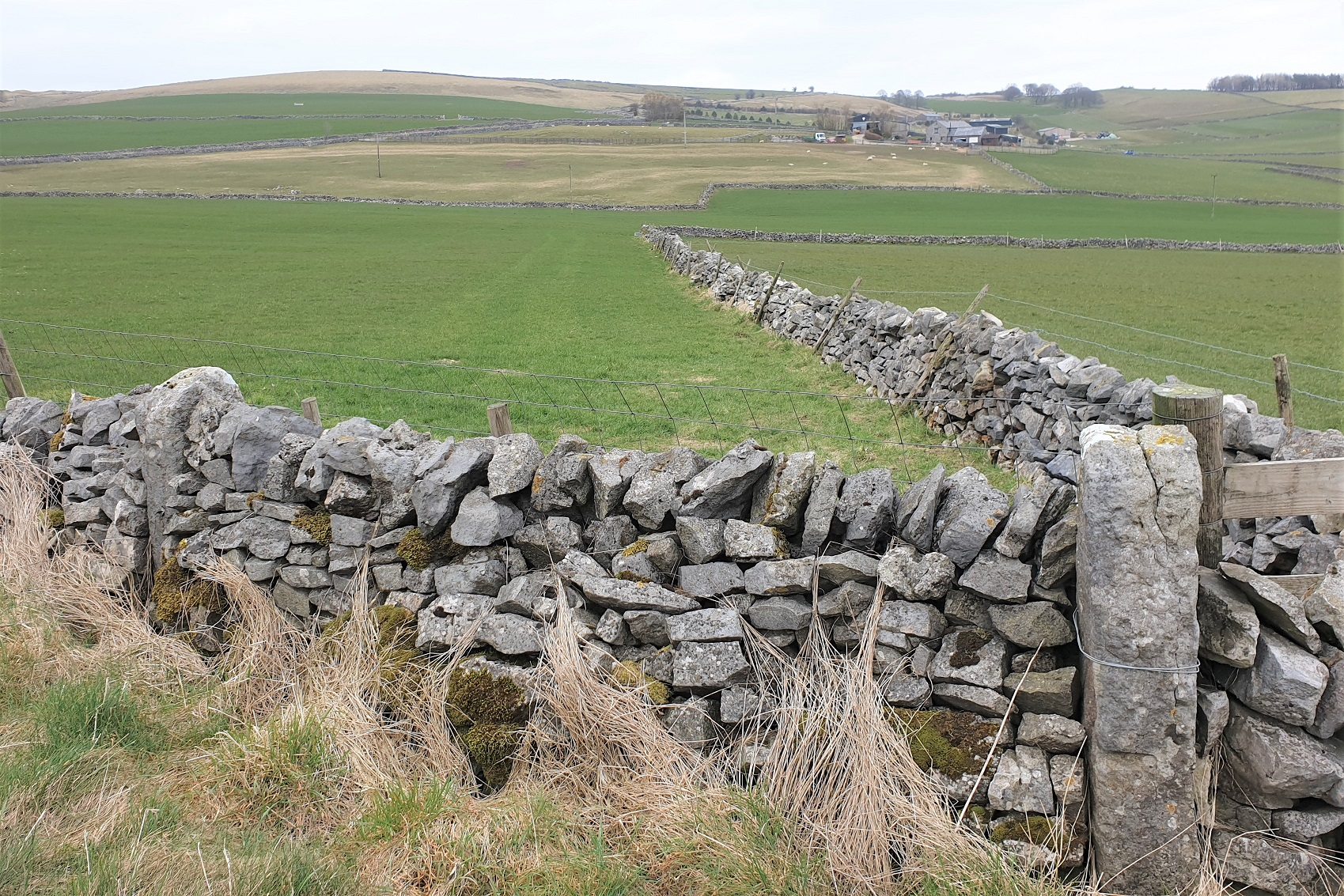
Route of Batham Gate Road near Peak Forest

A section of Batham Gate Road east of Peak Forest is a protected Scheduled Monument. There are also modern roads called Batham Gate Road at Peak Dale, near Buxton, and at Bradwell, near Brough, which are remnants of the route of the original Roman road. The section crossing Bradwell Moor is now called Clement Lane.

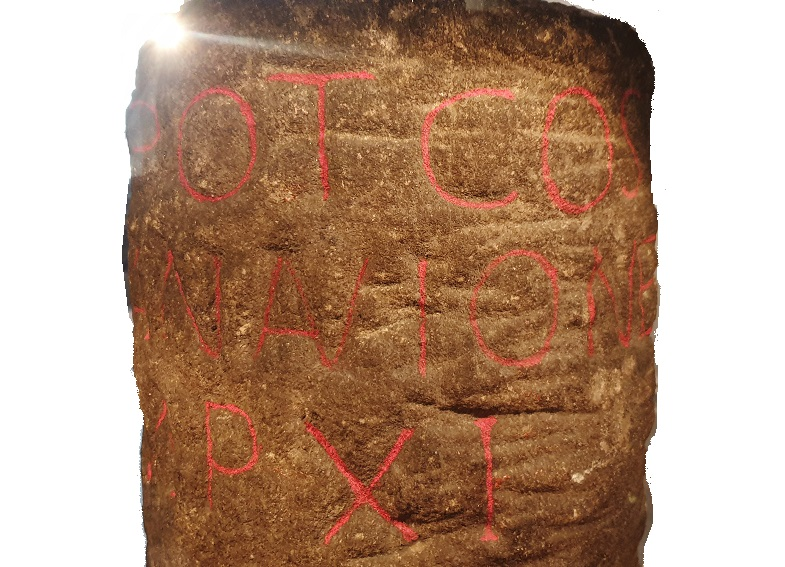
Inscription on Roman milestone found at Silverlands, Buxton

A Roman milestone was discovered in 1862 in the Silverlands district of Buxton. It is the oldest inscribed milestone found in Derbyshire. The inscription is ‘TRIB POT COS II P P A NAVIONE M P XI’ which means ‘With the tribune's power, twice consul, father of this country. From Navio 11 miles.' The milestone is on display in the Buxton Museum.
