= Moridunum (Axminster) =

Fort and town in Britannia, Ancient Rome

Coordinates: 50.77191°N 2.99833°W

Moridunum shown within Devon
(grid reference SY297974)

Moridunum was a fort and small town in the Roman province of Britannia. Its remains are located at Woodbury Farm, immediately south of Axminster in the English county of Devon.

The square fort was built at the intersection of two Roman roads, the Fosse Way and Durnovaria-Isca Dumnoniorum road, apparently in the 2nd century. Its ditch survives around much of the site. A civilian settlement soon grew up nearby, encouraged by the building of what has been interpreted as a large stone mansio for the provincial postal service. It was a centre for pottery production in the 3rd century and occupation continued until the end of the 4th.
