= Brough and Shatton =

Civil parish in Derbyshire, England

Coordinates: 53.340°N 1.714°W

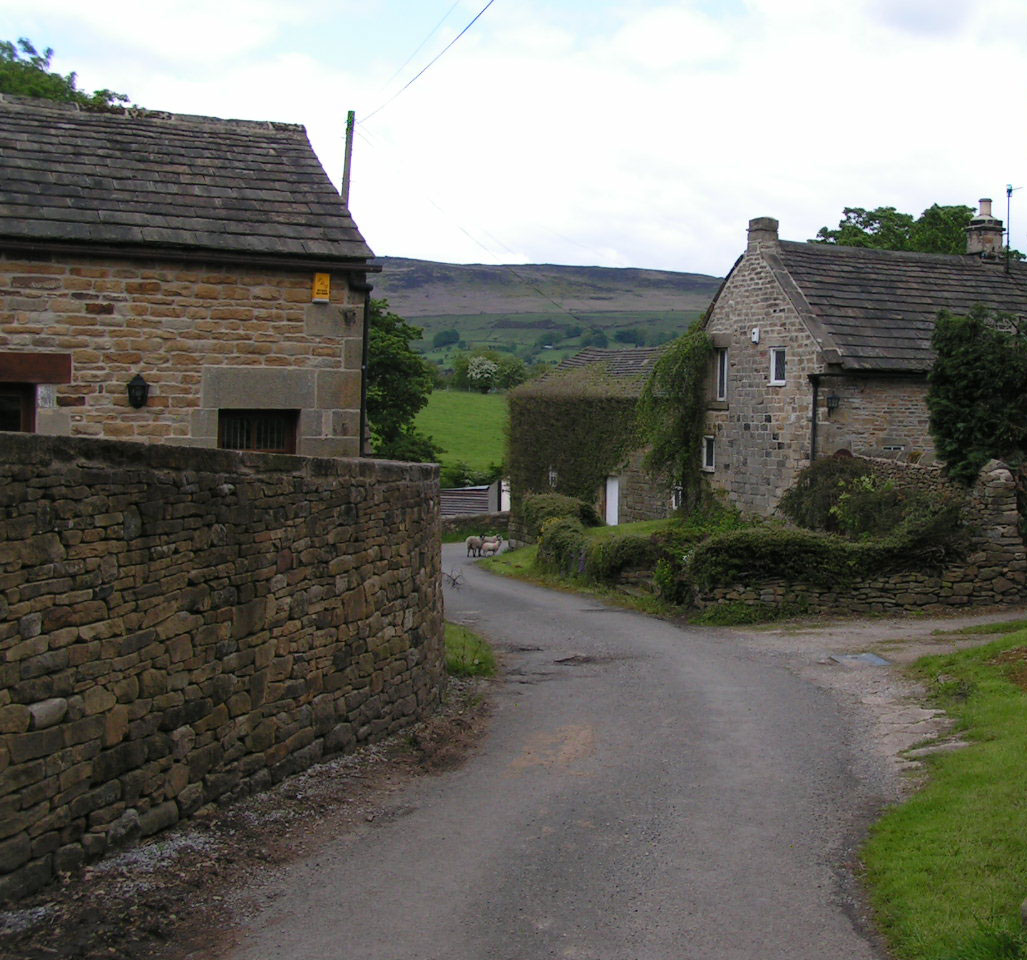
- Shatton.

- Brough and Shatton parish highlighted within Derbyshire
- Population: 129 (2021)
- OS grid reference: SK191826
- District: High Peak
- Shire county: Derbyshire
- Region: East Midlands
- Country: England
- Sovereign state: United Kingdom
- Post town: HOPE VALLEY
- Postcode district: S33
- Police: Derbyshire
- Fire: Derbyshire
- Ambulance: East Midlands
- UK Parliament: High Peak

Brough and Shatton is a civil parish in Hope Valley in the High Peak district of Derbyshire, England. It is named for the two hamlets of Brough-on-Noe and Shatton. Brough is about 2 km, or just over 1 mile, west (upstream) of Shatton; both are on the River Noe, a tributary of the upper River Derwent. They lie within the Peak District National Park, about 15 miles west of Sheffield and 30 miles east of Manchester. According to the 2021 census, Brough and Shatton had a combined population of 129. There is a friendly rivalry between the two hamlets, which contest numerous sports competitions throughout the year.

The remains of the Roman fort of Navio are close to Brough. Batham Gate, a Roman road connected Navio with the spa town of Buxton (Latin Aquae Arnemetiae) and, via a now lost route Templebrough on the River Don. Gate means "road" in northern English dialects; the name therefore means "road to the bath town".

== See also ==
- Listed buildings in Brough and Shatton
