= Wales in the Roman era =

Aspect of Welsh history

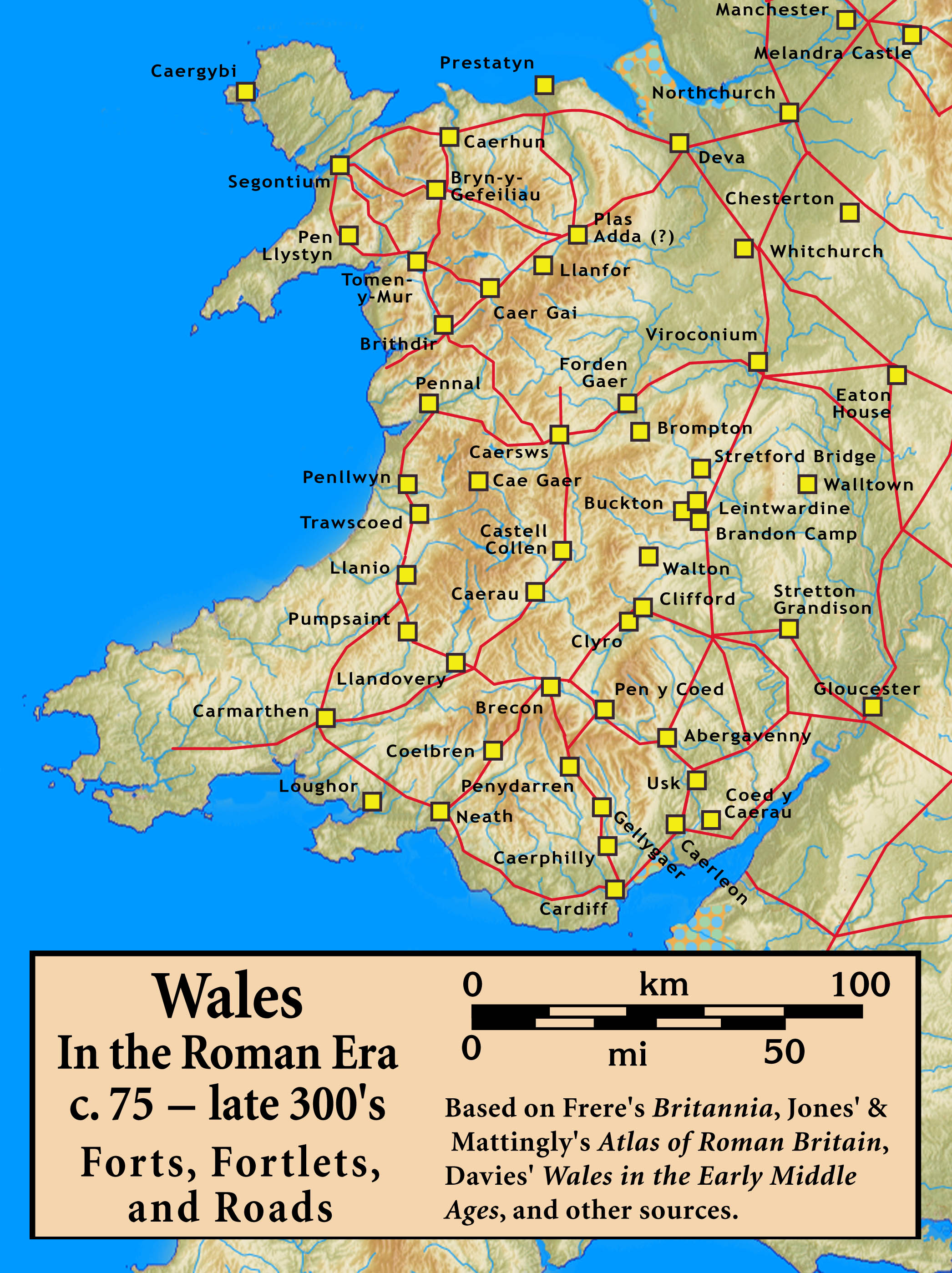
Roman Wales, c. 48 — c. 395: Military Forts, Fortlets, and Roads

The Roman era in the area of modern Wales began in 48 AD, with a military invasion by the imperial governor of Roman Britain. Most of the native tribes were under Roman subjugation by 90 AD (however, a mosaic of the Empire in the Roman Forum still did not include the lands of the Ordovices). Roman rule endured until it was abandoned around 383 AD.

The Romans kept a military presence in most of Wales during most of their occupation, except for the coastal region of South Wales east of the Gower Peninsula where Romanisation was strongest, and other southern sites such as Carmarthen, the civitas capital of the Demetae tribe. The only town in Wales founded by the Romans, Caerwent, is in South Wales.

Wales was a rich source of mineral wealth, and the Romans used their engineering technology to extract large amounts of gold, copper, and lead, as well as modest amounts of some other metals such as zinc and silver.

The Roman campaigns of conquest in Wales are documented in surviving ancient sources, which record in particular the resistance and ultimate conquest of two of the five native tribes, the Silures of the south east, and the Ordovices of central and northern Wales.

Aside from the many Roman-related discoveries at sites along the southern coast, Roman archaeological remains in Wales consist almost entirely of military roads and fortifications.

== Wales before the Roman conquest ==
Archaeologists generally agree that the British Isles were mainly inhabited by speakers of Celtic languages (Celts) before the Roman invasion, organized into many tribes. The area now known as Wales had no political or social unity, and Romans did not treat it as a distinct region.

Northern and southern Wales had some notable cultural differences before the Roman invasion, and should not be considered one entity. Southern Wales was advancing along with the rest of Britain throughout the Iron Age, whereas the northern parts of Wales were conservative and slower to advance. Along with their technological advancement, from the fifth to the first century BC, southern Wales became more heavily and densely populated. Southern Wales had more in common with the north than it did with the rest of Britain, and they saw little outside influence until the Roman conquest.

Hill forts are one of the most common sites found throughout Iron-Age Wales, and this is what archaeologists mostly rely on for most of their evidence. Nevertheless, due to the relative lack of archaeological activity, survey groupings of these forts throughout Wales can be uneven or misleading. Modern scholars theorize that Wales before the Roman conquest was similar to the rest of Iron Age Britain; however, this is still debated due to the sparsity of evidence. For the most part, the region's archaeological legacy consists of burials and hill forts. Wales (along with more distant parts of Britain) gradually stopped making pottery, which usually helps archaeologists explore the distant past, throughout the Iron Age. Archaeological assemblages such as the Wilburton complex suggest that there was trade throughout all of Britain including Wales, connecting with Ireland and Northern France.

== Britain in 47 AD ==
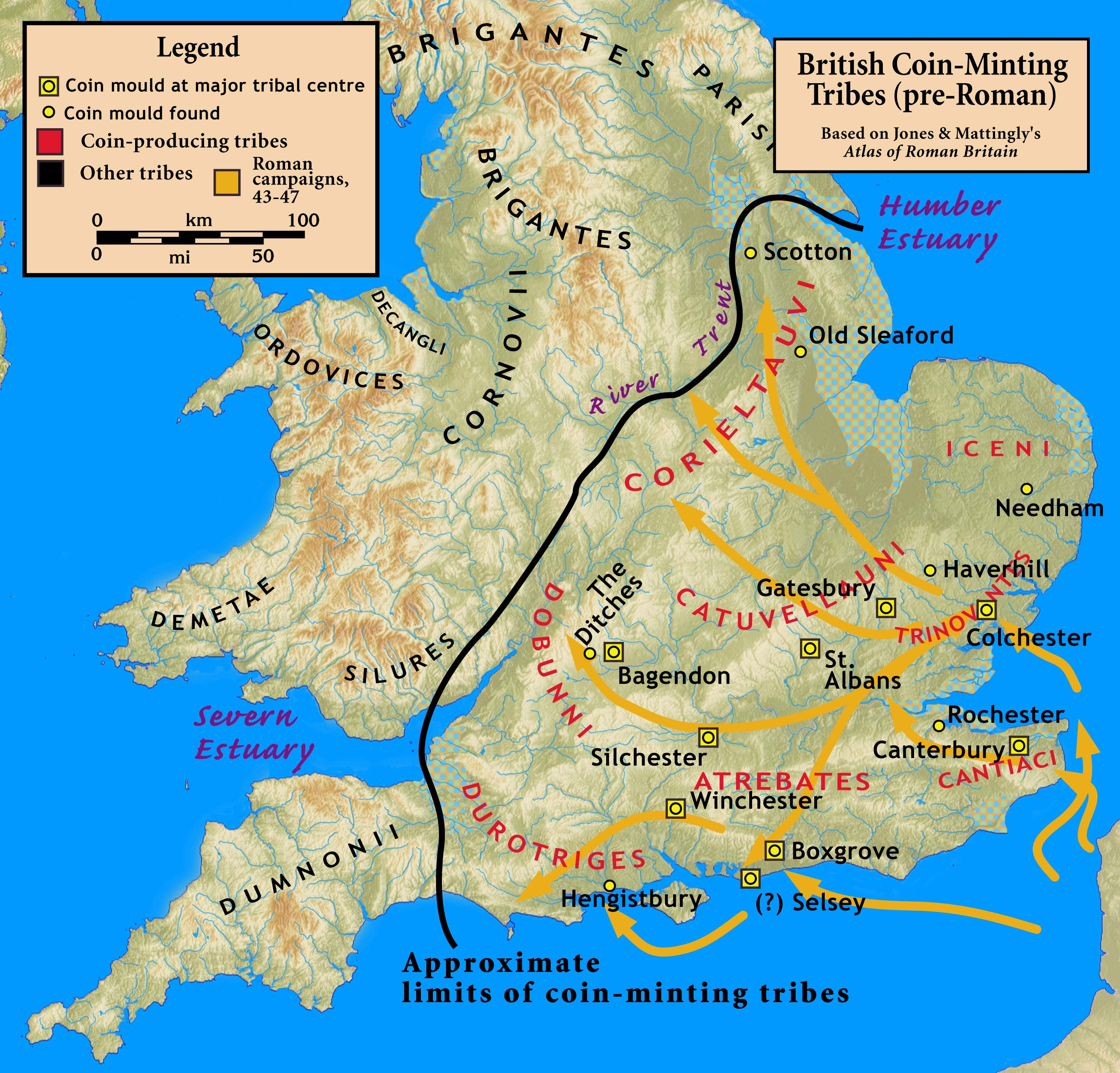

On the eve of the Roman invasion of Wales, the Roman military under Governor Aulus Plautius was in control of all of southeastern Britain as well as Dumnonia, perhaps including the lowland English Midlands as far as the Dee Estuary and the River Mersey, and having an understanding with the Brigantes to the north. They controlled most of the island's centres of wealth, as well as much of its trade and resources.

In Wales the known tribes (the list may be incomplete) included the Ordovices and Deceangli in the north, and the Silures and Demetae in the south. Archaeology combined with ancient Greek and Roman accounts have shown that there was exploitation of natural resources, such as copper, gold, tin, lead and silver at multiple locations in Britain, including in Wales. Apart from this we have little knowledge of the Welsh tribes of this era.

== Roman invasion and conquest ==
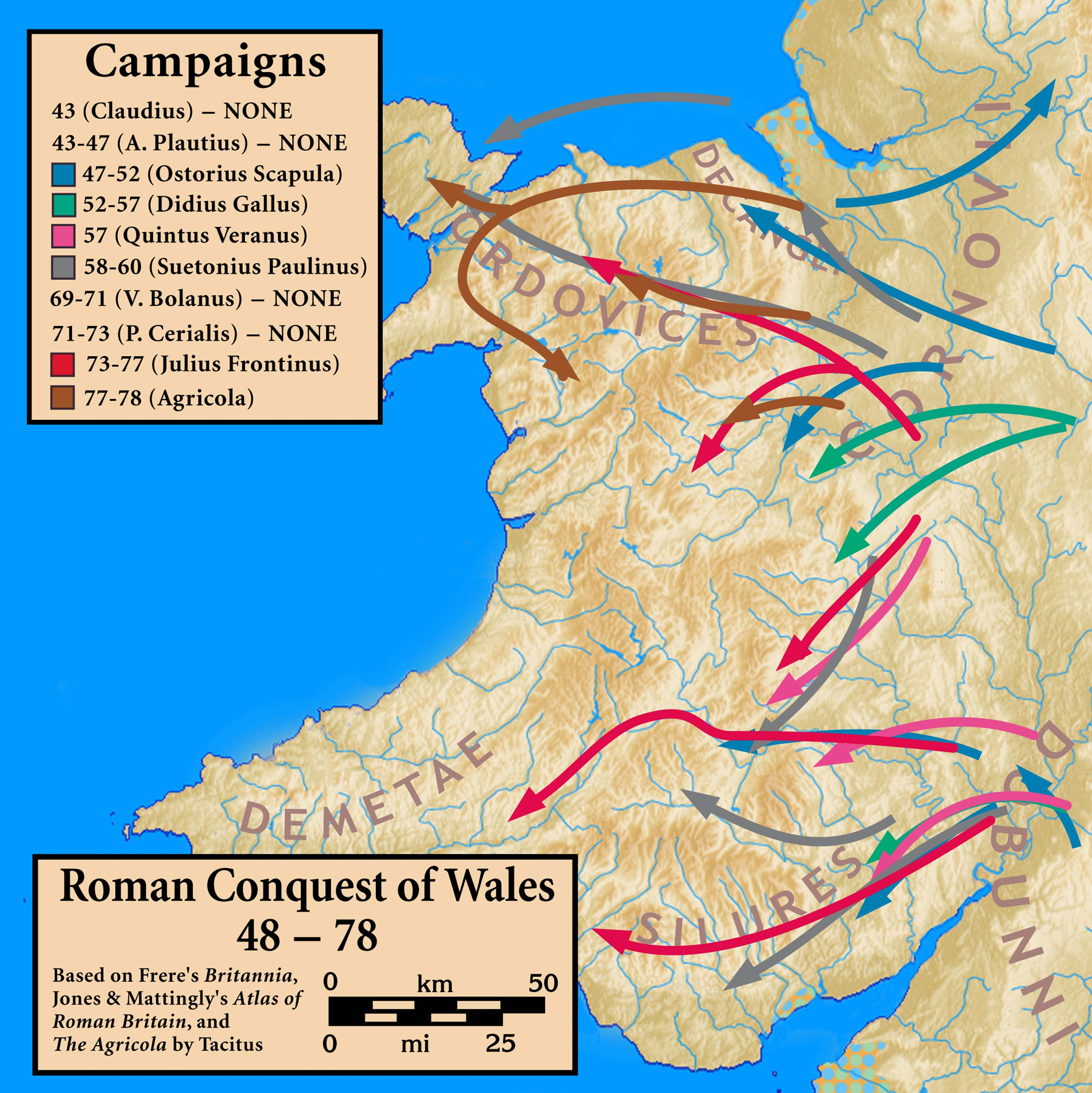

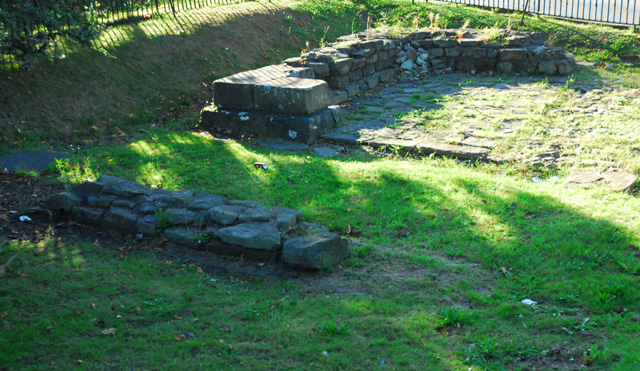
Roman Fort of Nidum (Neath)

There is uncertainty regarding which parts of Wales were invaded by the Romans prior to the conquest of Anglesey in AD 60, due to a lack of written source material, with Tacitus as the only written source documenting this period.

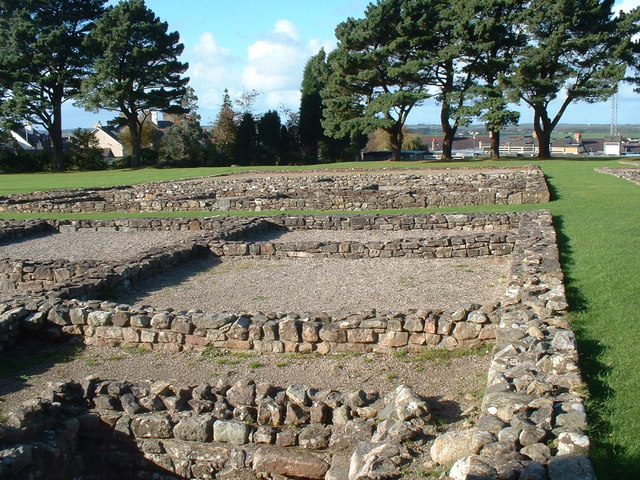
Segontium Roman Fort (Caernarfon)

Tacitus records that the 'Decangi', which scholars associate with the Welsh Deceangli, attacked a Roman ally in Britain. The Romans responded swiftly, imposing restrictions upon all of the suspected tribes, then they began to move against the Deceangli believed to have been between the years 48 or 49.

Shortly afterwards, the Romans campaigned against the Silures tribe of south-eastern Wales, which must have had previous encounters with the Roman army. The Silures (and later the Ordovices) were led by Caratacus, a king who had fled South-eastern England. Under Caratacus' rule, the Welsh fought the Romans in a pitched battle which led to the loss of all the Ordovician territory. This defeat was not crushing, and Caratacus continued to fight the Romans, defeating two auxiliary cohorts. Caratacus fled to the Queen of the Brigantes, Cartimandua, who was loyal to the Romans and handed Caratacus over to Roman forces 51 AD. While dealing with all these problems, in 52 the Roman governor, Publius Ostorius Scapula, died. which gave the Silures a respite before Scapula's successor, Didius Gallus, arrived. In that time, the Silures defeated a Roman legion led by Gaius Manlius Valens.

Schematic map of Roman roads and forts between Caerleon and west Wales dating to the later 1st century AD. Where the Roman names are known, these were identified through the Ravenna Cosmography (Note: The Ravenna Cosmography is a 7th century list of place names from the Roman World. In 1949 Richmond and Crawford published an article showing how British entries were ordered so as to follow routes along Roman roads, thus enabling a match with known places, in this case Roman forts along the road from Caerleon to west Wales.) (except for Luentinum and Moridunum which are mentioned in Ptolemy's Geographia).
Blue/black dots are listed in the Cosmography. Grey dots are other substantial forts known through archaeological remains.
1 Isca Augusta (Caerleon)
2 Gobannium, (Abergavenny)
3 Cicutio/Cicucium (Y Gaer, Brecon)
4 Alabum (Llanfair-ar-y-bryn, Llandovery)
5 Luentinum, (Pumsaint)
6 Bremia (Llanio, near Llanddewi Brefi)
7 Roman fort at Trawscoed
8 Roman Fort near Pen-llwyn
9 Dinefwr Park Roman forts, Llandeilo
10 Moridunum (Carmarthen)
11 Castell Collen (Llandrindod Wells)
12 Magnis (Kenchester), Herefordshire

In 54 AD, emperor Claudius was succeeded by Nero and after a short period of relative inaction, it was decided it was time to conquer the rest of the British Isles. The legionary fortress at Usk was established in 55 as a base for Legio XX Valeria Victrix to pacify the Silures. Quintus Veranius became governor of Britain in 57 and began to campaign against the Silures with success but in 58 he died. Suetonius Paulinus, his successor, began to shift north (suggesting that there was no notable opposition in the south) and was successful in his conquest of northern Wales. By 60 had pushed all the way to the Irish Sea because he was preparing for a conquest of Anglesey.

Anglesey was swelling with migrants fleeing from the Romans, and it had become a stronghold for the Druids. Despite the Romans initial fear and superstition of Anglesey, they were able to achieve victory and subdue the Welsh tribes. However, this victory was short-lived, and a massive rebellion in the province of Britain led by Boudica erupted in the east and interrupted the consolidation of Wales.

It was not until 74 that Frontinus resumed the campaigns against Wales. By the end of his term in 77 he had subdued most of Wales.

Only one tribe was left mostly intact throughout the conquest, the Demetae. This tribe did not oppose Rome, and developed peacefully, isolated from its neighbours and the Roman Empire. The Demetae were the only pre-Roman Welsh tribe to emerge from Roman rule with their tribal name intact.

== Roman Wales ==
=== Romanisation ===
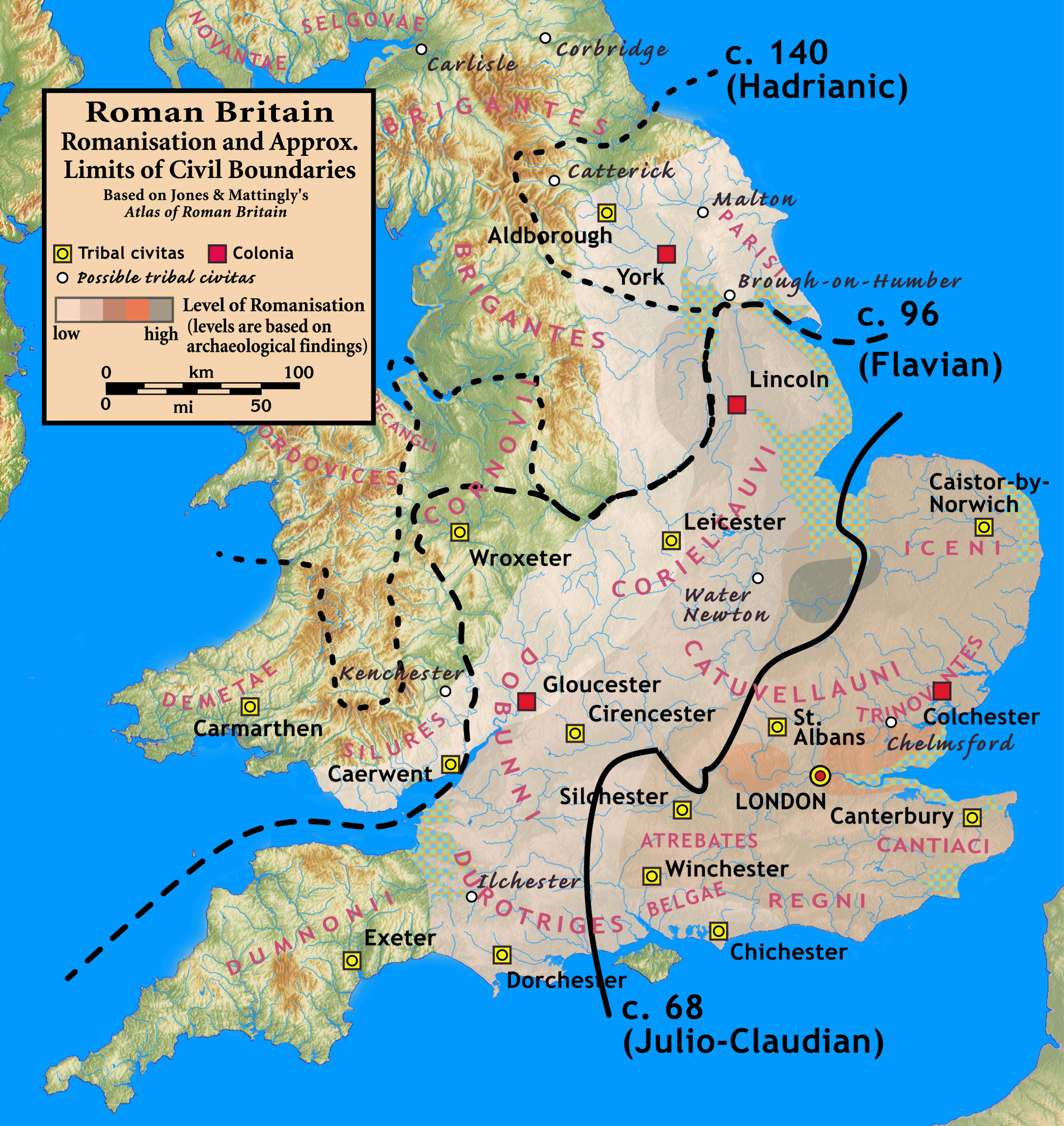
Levels of Romanisation

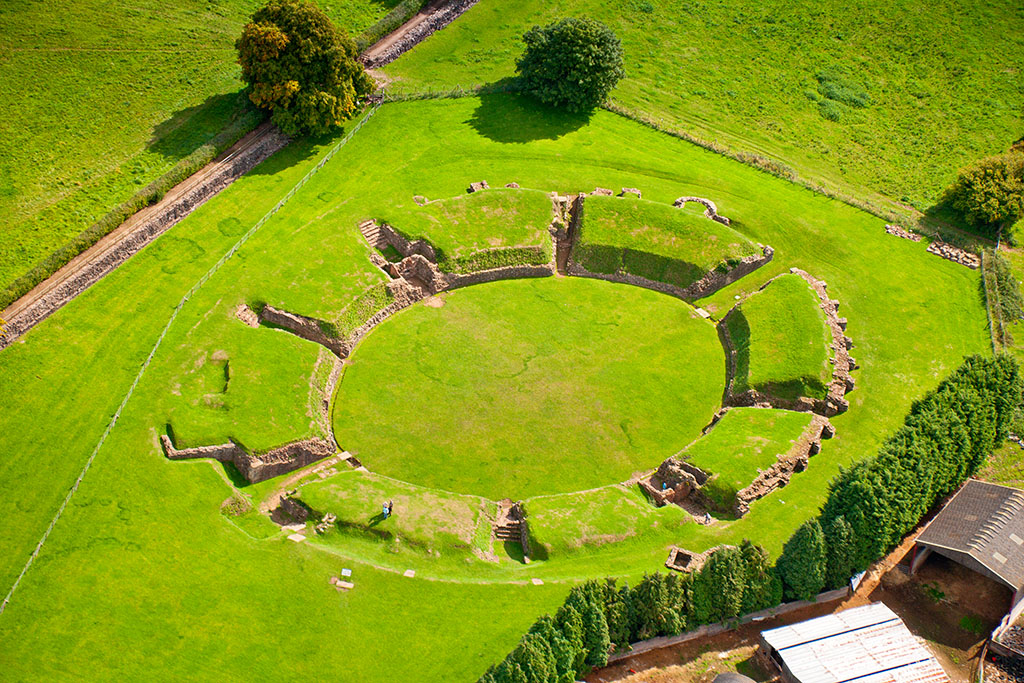
Caerleon Roman amphitheatre

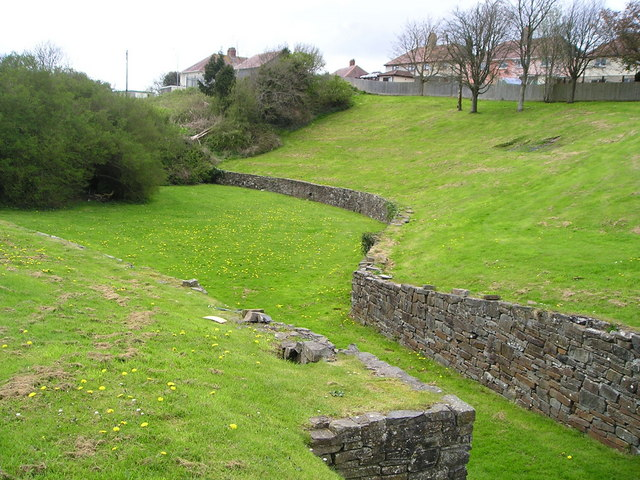
Amphitheatre of Moridunum (Carmarthen)

The Romans eventually occupied the whole of the area now known as Wales, where they built Roman roads and forts, mined gold at Luentinum and conducted commerce, but their interest in the area was limited because of the difficult geography and shortage of flat agricultural land. Most of the Roman remains in Wales are military in nature. Sarn Helen, a major highway, linked the North with South Wales.

The area was later controlled by Roman legionary bases at Deva Victrix (modern Chester) and Isca Augusta (Caerleon), two of the three such bases in Roman Britain, with roads linking these bases to auxiliaries' forts such as Segontium (Caernarfon) and Moridunum (Carmarthen). Numerous Roman forts were built throughout Wales, unlike in the rest of Britain, many of which were occupied at least until the Antonine era, and some were still in use in the 4th century.

South-east Wales was the most Romanised part of the country and it is possible that Roman estates in the area survived as recognisable units into the eighth century: the kingdom of Gwent is likely to have been founded by direct descendants of the (Romanised) Silurian ruling class.

The best indicators of Romanising acculturation are the presence of urban sites (areas with towns, coloniae, and tribal civitates) and villas in the countryside. The only civitates in Wales were at Carmarthen and Caerwent. There were three small urban sites near Caerwent, and these and Roman Monmouth were the only other "urbanised" sites in Wales.

Recent discoveries of villas have revised understanding of Romanisation in Wales, showing that high-status settlement extended further than previously believed, in North Wales near Wrexham, near Aberystwyth on the west coast and near Port Talbot.

In the southwestern homeland of the Demetae, several sites have been classified as villas in the past, but excavation of these and examination of sites as yet unexcavated suggest that they are pre-Roman family homesteads, sometimes updated through Roman technology (such as stone masonry), but having a native character quite different from the true Roman-derived villas that are found to the east, such as in Oxfordshire.

Perhaps surprisingly, the presence of Roman-era Latin inscriptions does not confirm full Romanisation, as they are most numerous at military sites, and their occurrence elsewhere depended on access to suitable stone and the presence of stonemasons, as well as patronage. The Roman fort complex at Tomen y Mur near the coast of northwestern Wales has produced more inscriptions than either Segontium (near modern Caernarfon) or Noviomagus Reginorum (Chichester).

==== List of Roman Auxiliary forts in Wales ====
- Alabum
- Blestium
- Bremia
- Caer Gai
- Caer Gybi
- Caer Llugwy
- Caer y Twr
- Caersws
- Canovium
- Cardiff
- Dinefwr Park
- Forden Gaer
- Y Garn Goch
- Gelligaer
- Gobannium
- Leucarum
- Luentinum
- Moridunum (Carmarthen)
- Nidum
- Pennal
- Segontium
- Tomen y Mur
- Trawscoed
- Y Gaer

=== Mining ===
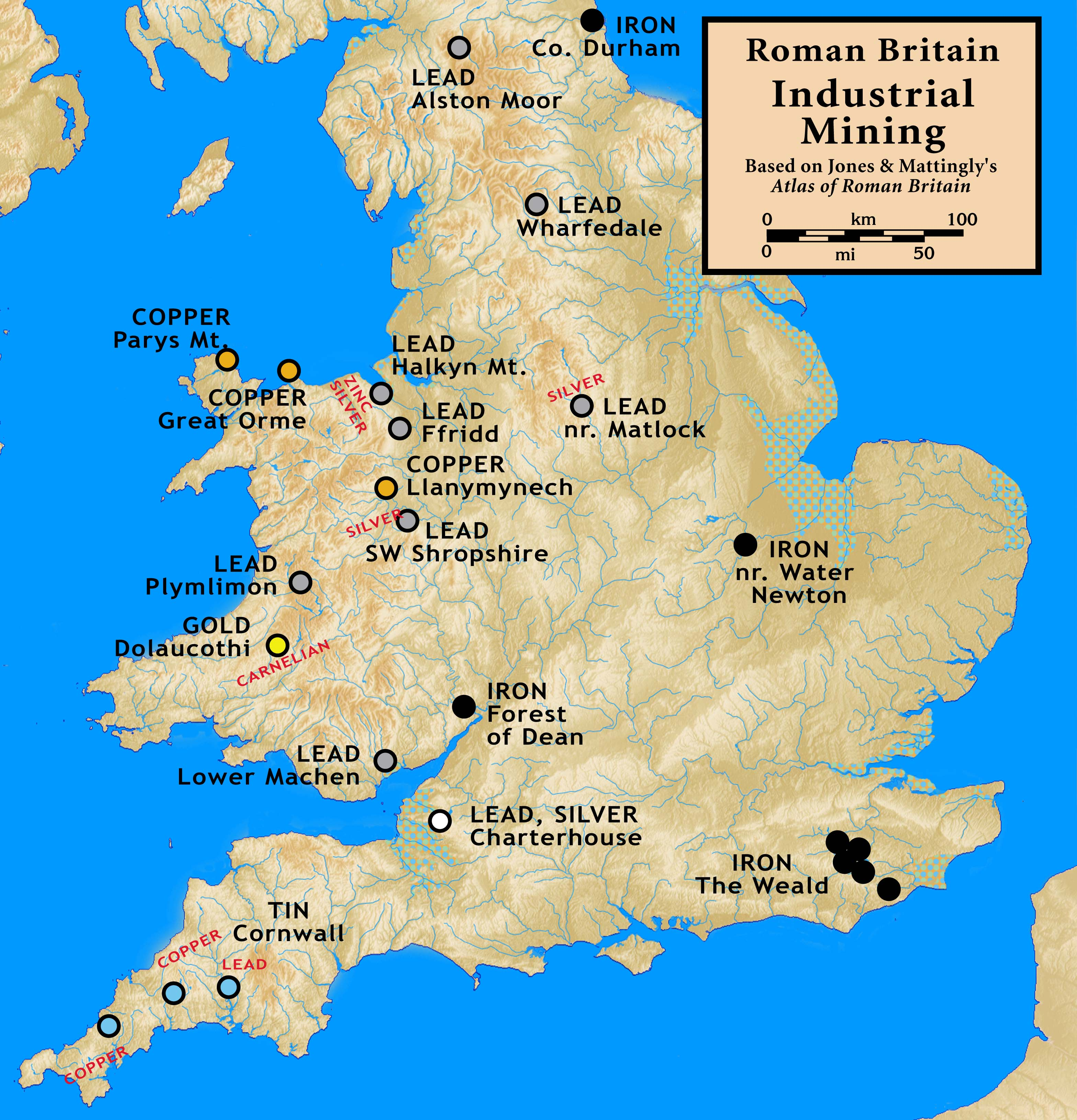

The mineral wealth of Britain was well-known prior to the Roman invasion and was one of the expected benefits of conquest. All mineral extractions were state-sponsored and under military control, as mineral rights belonged to the emperor. His agents soon found substantial deposits of gold, copper, and lead in Wales, along with some zinc and silver. Gold had been mined at Dolaucothi before the invasion, but Roman engineering was applied to greatly increase production of gold and other metals. This continued until the process was no longer practical or profitable, and the mine was abandoned.

Modern scholars have made efforts to quantify the value of these extracted metals to the Roman economy, and to determine the point at which the Roman occupation of Britain was "profitable" to the Empire. While these efforts have not produced definitive results, the benefits to Rome were substantial. The gold production at Dolaucothi alone may have been of economic significance.

=== Industrial production ===
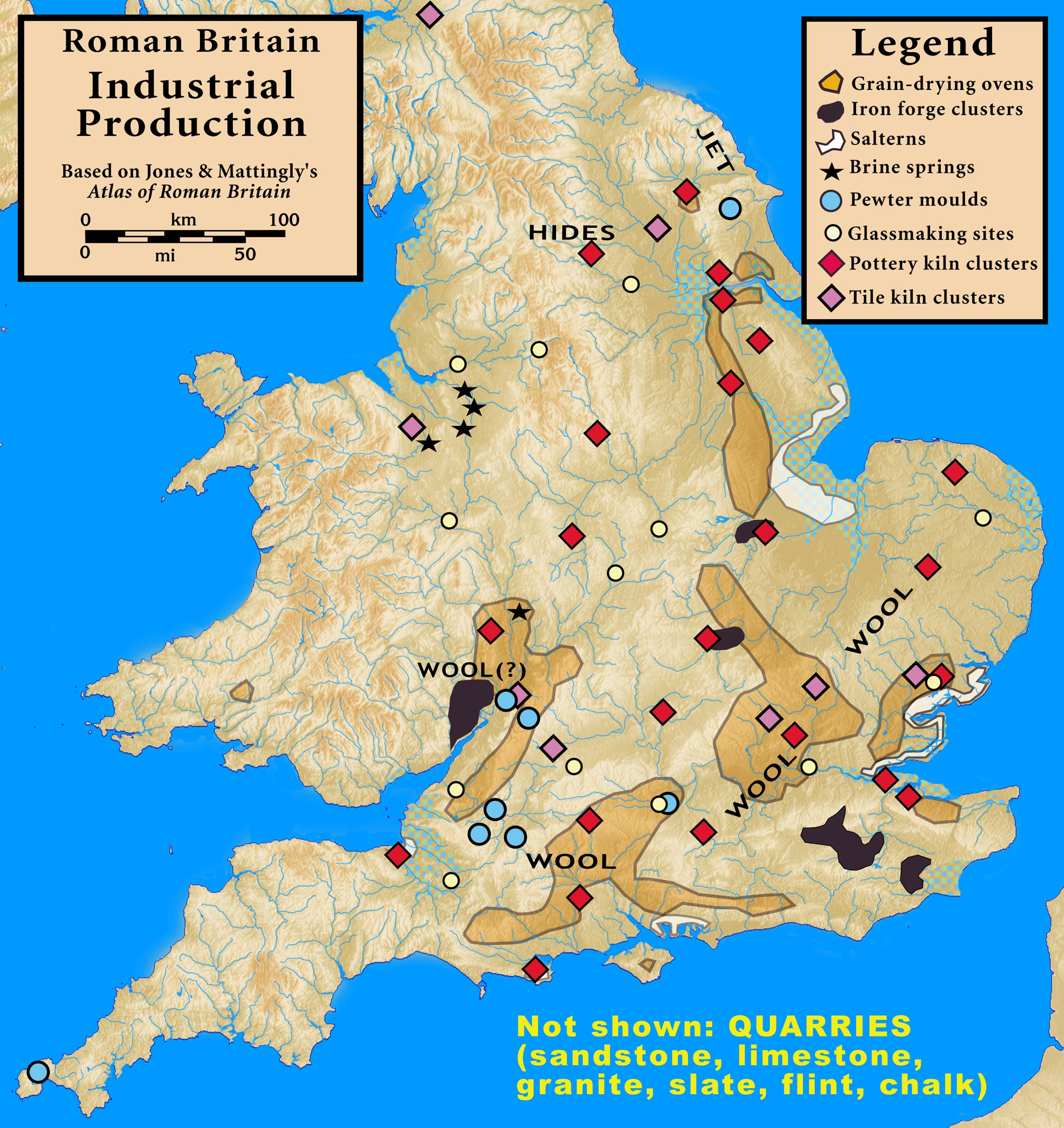

The production of goods for trade and export in Roman Britain was concentrated in the south and east, with virtually none situated in Wales.

This was largely due to circumstance, with iron forges located near iron supplies, pewter (tin with some lead or copper) moulds located near the tin supplies and suitable soil (for the moulds), clusters of pottery kilns located near suitable clayey soil, grain-drying ovens in agricultural areas where sheep were raised (for wool), and salt production concentrated in its historical pre-Roman locations. Glass-making sites were located in or near urban centres.

In Wales none of the needed materials were available in suitable combination, and the forested, mountainous countryside was not amenable to this kind of industrialisation.

Clusters of tileries, both large and small, were at first operated by the Roman military to meet their own needs, and so there were temporary sites wherever the army went and could find suitable soil. This included a few places in Wales. However, as Roman influence grew, the army was able to obtain tiles from civilian sources which located their kilns in the lowland areas containing good soil, and then shipped the tiles to wherever they were needed.

=== Native Hill forts ===
In areas of Roman civil control, such as the territories of a civitas, the occupation of native hill forts was banned as a matter of Roman policy. However, further inland and northward, a number of pre-Roman hill forts continued to be used in the Roman Era, while others were abandoned, and still others were newly occupied. The inference is that local leaders who were willing to accommodate Roman interests were encouraged and allowed to continue, providing local leadership under local law and custom.

=== Religion ===
There is virtually no evidence to shed light on the practice of religion in Wales during the Roman era, save the anecdotal account of the strange appearance and bloodthirsty customs of the druids of Anglesey by Tacitus during the conquest of Wales.

Wales contains almost no buildings related to religious practice, save where the Roman military was located, and these reflect the practices of non-native soldiers.

Archaeology suggests that Christianity came to Roman Britain slowly, gaining adherents among coastal merchants and in the upper classes first, and never becoming widespread outside of the southeast in the Roman Era. There is also evidence of a preference for non-Christian devotion in parts of Britain, such as in the upper regions of the Severn Estuary in the 4th century, from the Forest of Dean east of the River Wye continuously around the coast of the estuary, up to and including Somerset.

In the De Excidio et Conquestu Britanniae, written c. 540, Gildas provides a story of the martyrdom of Saint Alban at Verulamium, and of Julius and Aaron at Legionum Urbis, the 'City of the Legion', saying that this occurred during a persecution of Christians at a time when 'decrees' against them were issued. Bede repeats the story in his Ecclesiastical History, written c. 731. The otherwise unspecified 'City of the Legion' is arguably Caerleon, Welsh Caerllion, the 'Fortress of the Legion', and the only candidate with a long and continuous military presence that lay within a Romanised region of Britain, with nearby towns and a Roman civitas. Other candidates are Chester and Carlisle, though both were far from the Romanised area of Britain, and had a transitory, more military-oriented history.

A parenthetical note concerns Saint Patrick, a patron saint of Ireland. He was a Briton born c. 387 in Banna Venta Berniae, whose location is unknown due to transcription errors in surviving manuscripts; his home is a matter of conjecture, with sites near Carlisle favoured by some, while coastal South Wales is favoured by others.

== Irish settlement ==
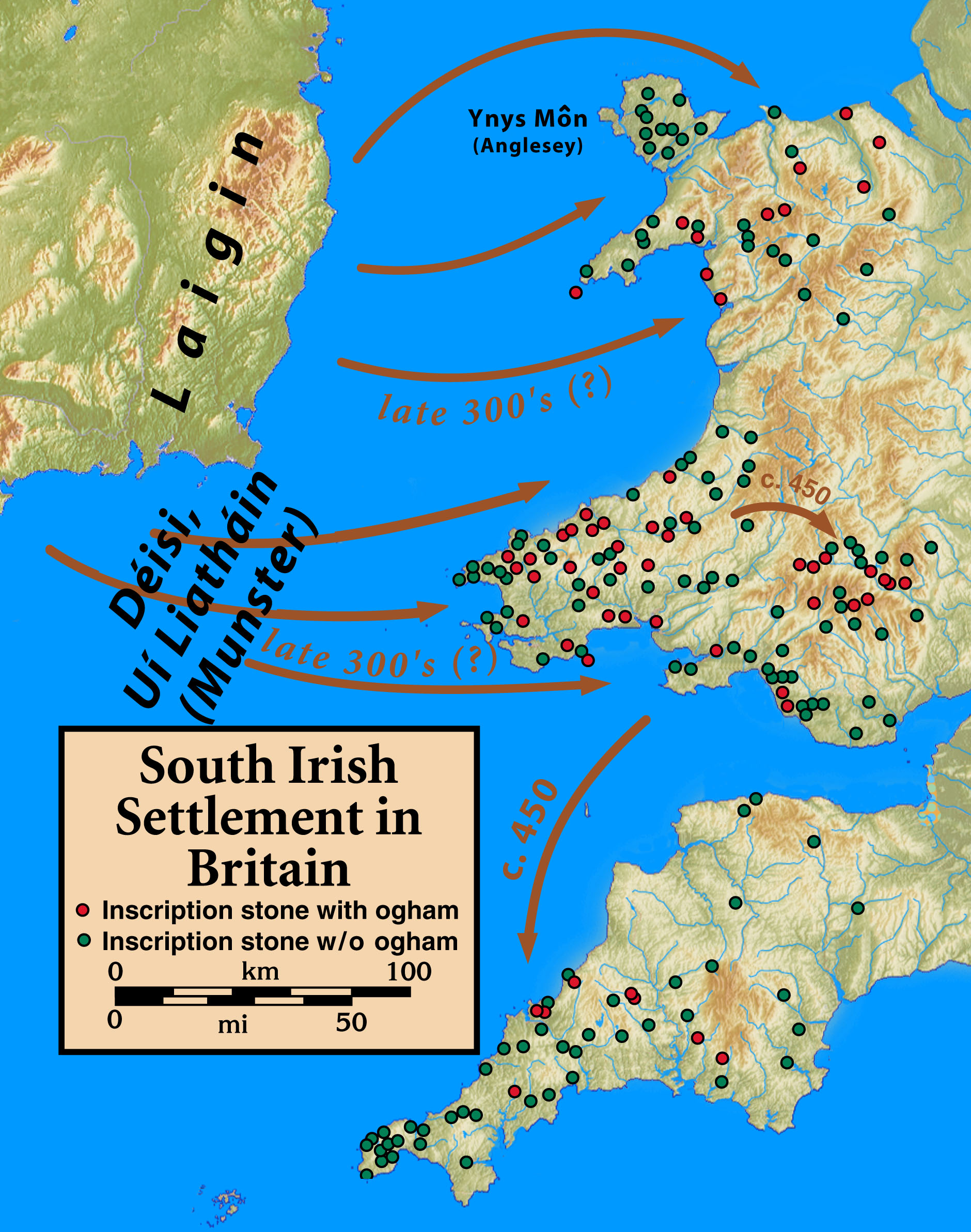

By the middle of the 4th century, the Roman presence in Britain was no longer vigorous. Once-unfortified towns were now being surrounded by defensive walls, including both Carmarthen and Caerwent. Political control finally collapsed, and a number of alien tribes then took advantage of the situation, raiding widely throughout the island, joined by Roman soldiers who had deserted and by elements of the native Britons. Order was restored in 369, but Roman Britain did not recover.

It was at this time that Wales received an infusion of settlers from southern Ireland, the Uí Liatháin, Laigin, and possibly Déisi, the last no longer seen as certain, with only the first two verified by reliable sources and place-name evidence. The Irish were concentrated along the southern and western coasts, in Anglesey and Gwynedd (excepting the cantrefi of Arfon and Arllechwedd), and in the territory of the Demetae.

The circumstances of their arrival are unknown, and theories include categorising them as "raiders", as "invaders" who established a hegemony, and as "foederati" invited by the Romans. It might as easily have been the consequence of a depopulation in Wales caused by plague or famine, both of which were usually ignored by ancient chroniclers.

What is known is that their characteristically Irish circular huts are found where they settled; that the inscription stones found in Wales, whether in Latin or ogham or both, are characteristically Irish; that when both Latin and ogham are present on a stone, the name in the Latin text is given in Brittonic form while the same name is given in Irish form in ogham; and that medieval Welsh royal genealogies include Irish-named ancestors who also appear in the native Irish narrative The Expulsion of the Déisi. This phenomenon may however be the result of later influences and again only the presence of the Uí Liatháin and Laigin in Wales has been verified.

== End of the Roman era ==
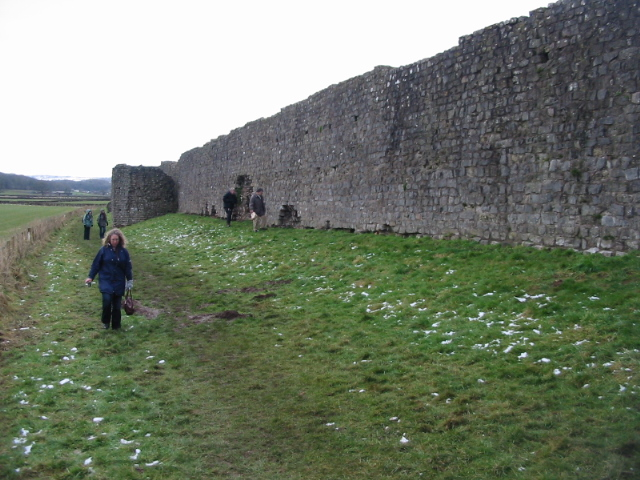
Roman Walls at Caerwent (Venta Silurum), erected c. 350.

Historical accounts tell of the upheavals in the Roman Empire during the 3rd and 4th centuries, with notice of the withdrawal of troops from Roman Britain in support of the imperial ambitions of Roman generals stationed there. In much of Wales, where Roman troops were the only indication of Roman rule, that rule ended when troops left and did not return. The end came to different regions at different times.

Tradition holds that Roman customs held on for several years in southern Wales, lasting into the late 5th and early 6th century, and that is true in part. Caerwent continued to be occupied after the Roman departure, while Carmarthen was probably abandoned in the late 4th century. In addition, southwestern Wales was the tribal territory of the Demetae, who had never become thoroughly Romanised. The entire region of southwestern Wales had been settled by Irish newcomers in the late 4th century, and it seems far-fetched to suggest that they were ever fully Romanised.

However, in southeast Wales, following the withdrawal of the Roman legions from Britain, the town of Venta Silurum (Caerwent) remained occupied by Romano-Britons until at least the early sixth century: Early Christian worship was still established in the town, that might have had a bishop with a monastery in the second half of that century.

Magnus Maximus

In Welsh literary tradition, Magnus Maximus is the central figure in the emergence of a free Britain in the post-Roman era. Royal and religious genealogies compiled in the Middle Ages have him as the ancestor of kings and saints. In the Welsh story of Breuddwyd Macsen Wledig (The Dream of Emperor Maximus), he is Emperor of Rome and marries a wondrous British woman, telling her that she may name her desires, to be received as a wedding portion. She asks that her father be given sovereignty over Britain, thus formalising the transfer of authority from Rome back to the Britons.

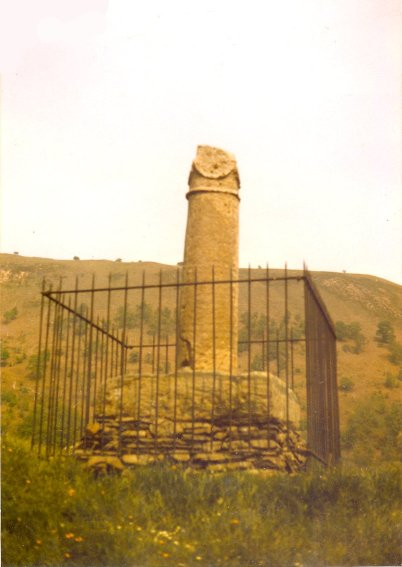
Remains of the Pillar of Eliseg near the town of Llangollen, Wales, erected c. 855. It lists Magnus Maximus as an ancestor of a medieval Welsh king.

Historically Magnus Maximus was a Roman general who served in Britain in the late 4th century, launching his successful bid for imperial power from Britain in 383. This is the last date for any evidence of a Roman military presence in Wales, the western Pennines, and Deva (i.e., the entire non-Romanised region of Britain south of Hadrian's Wall). Coins dated later than 383 have been excavated along the Wall, suggesting that troops were not stripped from it, as was once thought. In the De Excidio et Conquestu Britanniae written c. 540, Gildas says that Maximus left Britain not only with all of its Roman troops, but also with all of its armed bands, governors, and the flower of its youth, never to return. Having left with the troops and senior administrators, and planning to continue as the ruler of Britain, his practical course was to transfer local authority to local rulers.

After he became emperor of the Western Roman Empire, Maximus returned to Britain to campaign against the Picts and Scots (i.e., Irish), probably in support of Rome's long-standing allies the Damnonii, Votadini, and Novantae (all in modern Scotland). While there he likely made similar arrangements for a formal transfer of authority to local chiefs: the later rulers of Galloway, home to the Novantae, claimed Maximus as the founder of their line, as did the Welsh kings.

Maximus ruled the Roman West until he was killed in 388. A succession of governors ruled southeastern Britain until 407.

== Legacy ==
It has been argued that that the Welsh approach to property and estates cannot pre-date the 6th century and is thus post-Roman.

Little Latin linguistic heritage was left in the Welsh language, only a number of borrowings from the Latin lexicon. With the absence of early written Welsh sources there is no way of knowing when these borrowings were incorporated into Welsh; they may date from a later post-Roman era when the language of the literate was still Latin. Borrowings include a few common words and word forms. For example, Welsh ffenestr is from Latin fenestra, 'window'; llyfr is from liber, 'book'; ysgrif is from scribo, 'scribe'; and the suffix -wys found in Welsh folk names is derived from the Latin suffix -ēnsēs. There are a few military terms, such as caer from Latin castra, 'fortress'. Eglwys, meaning 'church', is ultimately derived from the Greek klēros.

Welsh kings later used the authority of Magnus Maximus as the basis of their inherited political legitimacy. While imperial Roman entries in Welsh royal genealogies lack any historical foundation, they serve to illustrate the belief that legitimate royal authority began with Magnus Maximus. According to The Dream of Emperor Maximus, Maximus married a Briton, and their supposed children are given in genealogies as the ancestors of kings. Tracing ancestries back further, Roman emperors are listed as the sons of earlier Roman emperors, thus incorporating many famous Romans (e.g., Constantine the Great) into the royal genealogies.

The kings of medieval Gwynedd trace their origins to the northern British kingdom of Manaw Gododdin (located in modern Scotland), and they also claim a connection to Roman authority in their genealogies ("Eternus son of Paternus son of Tacitus"). This claim might have been an invention intended to rival the legitimacy of kings claiming descent from the historical Maximus.

Gwyn A. Williams argues that even at the time of the construction of Offa's Dyke (that divided Wales from medieval England) the people to its west saw themselves as "Roman", citing the number of Latin inscriptions still being made into the 8th century.

== Works cited ==
- Bede (731), "Ecclesiastical History, Ch. VIII", in Giles, J. A. (ed.), The Miscellaneous Works of Venerable Bede, vol. II, London: Whittaker and Co., p. 53
- Davies, John (1993), A History of Wales (First ed.), London: Penguin Group, ISBN 0-7139-9098-8
- Davies, Wendy (1982), Wales in the Early Middle Ages, Leicester: Leicester University Press, ISBN 0-7185-1235-9
- Frere, Sheppard Sunderland (1987), Britannia: A History of Roman Britain (3rd, revised ed.), London: Routledge & Kegan Paul, ISBN 0-7102-1215-1
- Giles, John Allen, ed. (1841), "The Works of Gildas", The Works of Gildas and Nennius, London: James Bohn
- Jones, Barri; Mattingly, David (2007), An Atlas of Roman Britain, Cambridge: Blackwell Publishers, ISBN 978-1-84217-067-0
- Laing, Lloyd (1977), "Wales and the Isle of Man", The Archaeology of Late Celtic Britain and Ireland, c. 400–1200 AD, Frome: Book Club Associates, pp. 89–119
- Laing, Lloyd; Laing, Jennifer (1990), "The non-Romanized zone of Britannia", Celtic Britain and Ireland, c. 200–800, New York: St. Martin's Press, pp. 96–123, ISBN 0-312-04767-3
- Lloyd, John Edward (1912), A History of Wales from the Earliest Times to the Edwardian Conquest, vol. I (2nd ed.), London: Longmans, Green, and Co
- Mattingly, David (2007), An Imperial Possession: Britain in the Roman Empire, London: Penguin Books, ISBN 978-0-14-014822-0
- Maund, Kari (2006), The Welsh Kings. Warriors, Warlords and Princes, Stroud: Tempus Publishing, ISBN 0-7524-2973-6
- Rhys, John (1904), Celtic Britain (3rd ed.), London: Society for Promoting Christian Knowledge
- Snyder, Christopher A. (1998), An Age of Tyrants: Britain and the Britons A.D. 400–600, University Park: Pennsylvania State University Press, ISBN 0-271-01780-5
- Tacitus, Publius Cornelius (1836), Murphy, Arthur (ed.), The Works of Cornelius Tacitus (English translation) (New ed.), London: Jones & Co.
