= Sarn Helen =

Roman road in Wales

Coordinates: 53.282°N 3.828°W

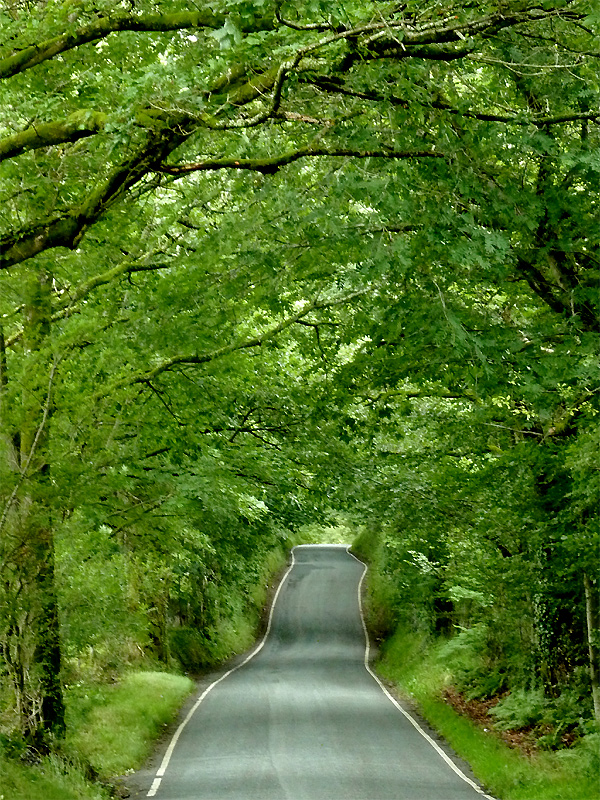
- Sarn Helen in Ceredigion
- Interactive map of Sarn Helen
- Location: Sections in north Wales, mid Wales & south Wales

History
- Built by: Ancient Britons, Roman Empire

Sarn Helen refers to several stretches of Roman road in Wales. The 160-mile (260 km) route, which follows a meandering course through central Wales, connects Aberconwy in the north with Carmarthen in the west. Despite its length, academic debate continues as to the precise course of the Roman road. Many sections are now used by the modern road network while other parts are still traceable. However, there are sizeable stretches that have been lost and are unidentifiable.

The route is named after Saint Elen of Caernarfon, a Celtic saint, whose story is told in The Dream of Macsen Wledig, part of the Mabinogion. She is said to have ordered the construction of roads in Wales during the late 4th century.

== Route ==
=== Aberconwy–Carmarthen ===
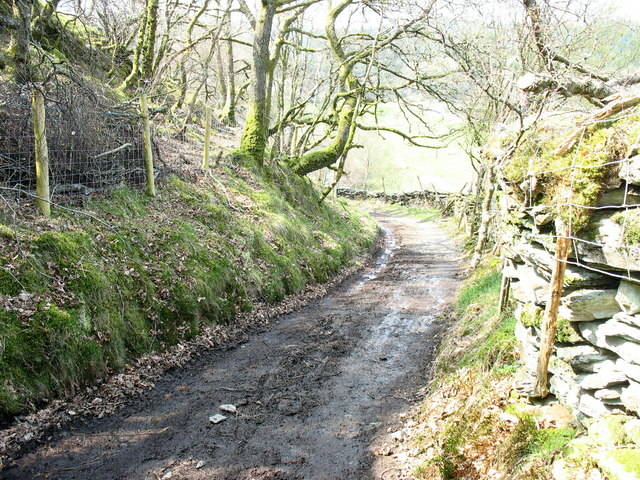
A section of Sarn Helen near Betws-y-Coed

In the north the route is believed to follow the western bank of the river Conwy from Canovium, a fort at Caerhun, passing through Trefriw, then leading on to Betws-y-Coed, with a branch leading to Caer Llugwy near Capel Curig. The route then passed through Dolwyddelan, running through the Cwm Penamnen valley and past the higher parts of Cwm Penmachno. The route then leads on past Llan Ffestiniog to the Roman fort of Tomen y Mur, near Trawsfynydd before continuing south towards Dolgellau.

South of Dolgellau the route passes over Waen Llefenni into Cwm yr Hengae to Aberllefenni. Part of the narrow-gauge Corris Railway between Aberllefenni and Maespoeth Junction may run along the line of the Sarn. A minor road running along the east bank of the Afon Dulas near Esgairgeiliog, Powys might be Roman in origin. Although potentially the Roman road remained on the west bank of the Dulas between Corris and Ffridd Gate.

Sarn Helen might have crossed the Afon Dyfi at a ford or ferry near Cefn Caer, a small Roman fort at Pennal in southern Gwynedd.

In Ceredigion part of a B-road at Bronant is Roman, and six miles south is a long stretch through the hamlet of Stag's Head. The road is identifiable at Llanio, where there was a small Roman fort named Bremia. The route then heads southeast towards the Dolaucothi Gold Mines near Pumsaint, Carmarthenshire, before passing the substantial Roman fort of Luentinum before finally reaching its historical end at Alabum (modern-day Llandovery). The Roman encampment was on Llanfair Hill. In the 12th century, the Normans reused part of the site and its earthworks to build the mediaeval church of St Mary's Church, Llanfair-ar-y-bryn. The fort stood at the junction of Roman roads, linking the Dolaucothi gold mines to Moridunum (Carmarthen) and Y Gaer near Brecon.

=== Neath–Brecon ===
A further section of Roman road leading north-eastwards from Neath (Nidum) to Banwen at the southern edge of the Brecon Beacons National Park is also known as Sarn Helen. It continues north-eastwards through the park to the north-west of Ystradfellte, beneath Fan Frynych, and then across Mynydd Illtud en route to the Roman fort of y Gaer (Cicucium).

== Outdoor pursuits ==
=== Cycle route ===
A long-distance mountain bike route named the Sarn Helen Trail follows parts of the road's course. The 270-mile (430 km) trail, which was devised in 1996, runs between Conwy on the North Wales coast and Worms Head on the Gower Peninsula.

=== Fell running ===
The road gives its name to the annual Sarn Helen Hill Race that starts and finishes in Lampeter in mid-Wales. The 16.5-mile (26.6 km) multi-terrain race, founded in 1980, takes place in May each year. It claims to combine "the speed of road racing with the rigours of cross country and fell running over a challenging picturesque course".

== In popular culture ==
"Sarn Helen" is the title of a song by Welsh band Super Furry Animals, appearing on their Welsh language album Mwng. It is also the title of a 1997 sequence of poems by English poet John Wilkinson and a 2023 travel book by Tom Bullough, who walked the route in 2020.

== Bibliography ==
- Wilkinson, John (1997). Sarn Helen. Cambridge: Equipage.
