= Bremia (fort) =

Roman fort in Llanio, West Wales

- Llanio Roman Fort
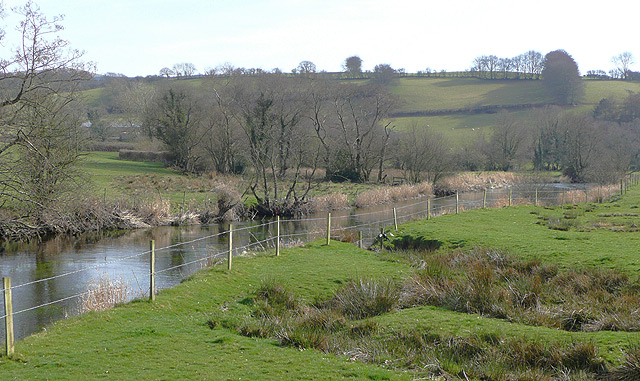

- Location within Ceredigion
- 52.1896°N 3.9848°W
- Location: Llanio, Llanddewi Brefi, Ceredigion, Wales

History
- Founded: c. 73 - 77 AD
- Built: Vespasian
- Abandoned: c. 125 AD

Site notes
- Discovered: Late 17th century
- Condition: Traces and crop marks

Bremia is the name of the Roman fort in the small dispersed settlement of Llanio, West Wales. It is in Llanddewi Brefi community area, south-west of Tregaron, in Ceredigion. The fort was built by the Romans around AD 75 and was in use to AD 120 in Roman Wales. The fort was situated on Sarn Helen, a Roman road leading north from the fort at Dolaucothi. Five inscribed stones have been found within the fort and surrounding military settlement. Two of these have inscriptions which show the garrison to include to a cohort from the Asturias, northern Spain. Amongst the excavations on the site, is the bathhouse. The bathhouse and fort are scheduled monuments, giving them statutory protection from disturbance.

Schematic map of Roman roads and forts between Caerleon and west Wales dating to the later 1st century AD. Where the Roman names are known, these were identified through the Ravenna Cosmography (Note: The Ravenna Cosmography is a 7th century list of place names from the Roman World. In 1949 Richmond and Crawford published an article showing how British entries were ordered so as to follow routes along Roman roads, thus enabling a match with known places, in this case Roman forts along the road from Caerleon to west Wales.) (except for Luentinum and Moridunum which are mentioned in Ptolemy's Geographia).
Blue/black dots are listed in the Cosmography. Grey dots are other substantial forts known through archaeological remains.
1 Isca Augusta (Caerleon)
2 Gobannium, (Abergavenny)
3 Cicutio/Cicucium (Y Gaer, Brecon)
4 Alabum (Llanfair-ar-y-bryn, Llandovery)
5 Luentinum, (Pumsaint)
6 Bremia (Llanio, near Llanddewi Brefi)
7 Roman fort at Trawscoed
8 Roman Fort near Pen-llwyn
9 Dinefwr Park Roman forts, Llandeilo
10 Moridunum (Carmarthen)
11 Castell Collen (Llandrindod Wells)
12 Magnis (Kenchester), Herefordshire

== Documentary evidence ==
The only documentary evidence for the name Bremia is a list of place names of the known world compiled in around 700 AD, known as the Ravenna Cosmography. This places Bremia on the route that runs from Gobannium (Abergavenny) through Alabum (Llandovery) (see map below). The fort at Llanio is assumed to be the location referred to, and the nearby 'Afon Brefi' stream name, running through Llanddewi Brefi supports that.

== Archaeological evidence ==
The archaeological remains at the site were first noted in the 17th century by Edward Lhuyd, at a site he called 'Cae'r Castell'. Coins, bricks and pottery were all found by him. Details of various excavations were published in 1888, 1961, 1969 and 1972. The dry summers of 1975 and 1976 revealed the extent of the defensive banks and ditches, some street patterns and other details, through cropmarks on aerial photographs. The almost square enclosure, with characteristic rounded corners, measures some 130 metres (430 ft) across, and could have garrisoned some 500 soldiers. Further occupation evidence outside the fort suggests a vicus (settlement) grew up to the south of the fort, which may have housed a further 1,000 people. During the late 1960s and early 1970s a number of excavations were made at the site of the bathhouse, which revealed foundation trenches although the building materials had been removed, and no firm dating evidence was found. A gradiometer geophysical survey of 2005, 75m to the west of the fort, plotted the line of a Roman road running east-west, from the fort, through building plots, with evidence of small smelting or burning sites.

== Inscribed stones ==
During excavations, five different inscribed stones have been found. Two of these refer to the cohort of auxiliaries that garrisoned the fort, the other three name different centurions whose men had constructed parts of the fort. The cohort stones read, 'COH II ASTVR ...' ("The Second Cohort of Asturians [...]") and '...MIBVS ...COH II ASTVR', ("[...]mibus [...] the Second Cohort of Asturians"). The centurial stones read, 'ARTI MENNIVS PRIMVS', ("The century of Artius Mennius Primus [made this]"; 'ARTI', ("The century of Artius [made this]"); 'VERIONIS', ("The century of Verionus [made this]").

== See also ==
- List of Scheduled Roman to modern Monuments in Ceredigion
- Loventium and Alabum, nearby forts
