= Alabum =

Former Roman fort in south Wales

Coordinates: 52°00′04″N 3°47′36″W

Schematic map of Roman roads and forts between Caerleon and west Wales dating to the later 1st century AD. Where the Roman names are known, these were identified through the Ravenna Cosmography (Note: The Ravenna Cosmography is a 7th century list of place names from the Roman World. In 1949 Richmond and Crawford published an article showing how British entries were ordered so as to follow routes along Roman roads, thus enabling a match with known places, in this case Roman forts along the road from Caerleon to west Wales.) (except for Luentinum and Moridunum which are mentioned in Ptolemy's Geographia).
Blue/black dots are listed in the Cosmography. Grey dots are other substantial forts known through archaeological remains.
1 Isca Augusta (Caerleon)
2 Gobannium, (Abergavenny)
3 Cicutio/Cicucium (Y Gaer, Brecon)
4 Alabum (Llanfair-ar-y-bryn, Llandovery)
5 Luentinum, (Pumsaint)
6 Bremia (Llanio, near Llanddewi Brefi)
7 Roman fort at Trawscoed
8 Roman Fort near Pen-llwyn
9 Dinefwr Park Roman forts, Llandeilo
10 Moridunum (Carmarthen)
11 Castell Collen (Llandrindod Wells)
12 Magnis (Kenchester), Herefordshire

The rectangular enclosure that defined this Roman fort was built in the 70s AD as part of the campaign to integrate southern Wales into the Roman province of Britannia Superior. It lay on a key road, now known as the Sarn Helen (RR69), from the legionary fortress of Isca Augusta (Caerleon) that ran north west across Wales to Bremia and on to North Wales. It also sat on a road (the Via Julia Montana, or RR623) running from Moridunum (Carmarthen) across to eastern Wales at Castell Collen (Llandrindod Wells). It thus held an important crossroads along with a bridging point over the River Towy, and the town that grew up near the fort retained its significance and became Llandovery.

== Name and Designation ==
The name Alabum is known from a 7th-century list of places known as the Ravenna Cosmography and is identified as this particular fort from the arrangement of the named places along the Roman road network.

The western side of the site has some well preserved scarped banks although much of the fort has been built-over or otherwise obscured. Early documentation of the site was made in 1873, where it was suggested it could be the location for 'Loventinum', a place name recorded by Ptolemy for which Pumsaint has subsequently been the preferred location. The Llandovery fort was noted on the First Series Ordnance Survey map of 1888. In 1949 the Llandovery site was identified as a good fit for the place-name of Alabum. On 11 April 1961 it was designated a Scheduled Ancient Monument (Ref. CM188), giving the site statutory protection from damage.

== Location ==
The enclosure is 170 metres (560 ft) by 120 metres (390 ft) and at some point was reduced in size. The presence of some earlier ceramics and evidence from stratigraphy hints at a possible earlier (50s AD) beginning to the fort. It is located within the former parish of Llanfair-ar-y-bryn and is within the community of Llandovery in the Welsh county of Carmarthenshire. The road now known as Llanfair Hill runs through the site of the fort enclosure, and may well be on the line of one of the Roman streets. St Mary's Church, a 12th-century building on the site of an earlier monastic cell, also stands within the fort enclosure.

== History ==
The 5.25 acres (2.12 ha) fort was probably built in the 1st century with an enclosing rampart and double ditch. A quadruple ditch was dug on the north-east side to protect the flat terrain in that direction. A stone revetment was later added. A military bath house lay between the fort and the River Bran. The chain of military forts across southern Wales appear to have been active between the 70s to 120s AD, although there is some evidence of the site still being occupied into the 4th century.

A faint earthwork can still be seen around the church of St Mary which has Roman tiles incorporated into its fabric.
