= Gobannium =

Coordinates: 51.822°N 3.018°W

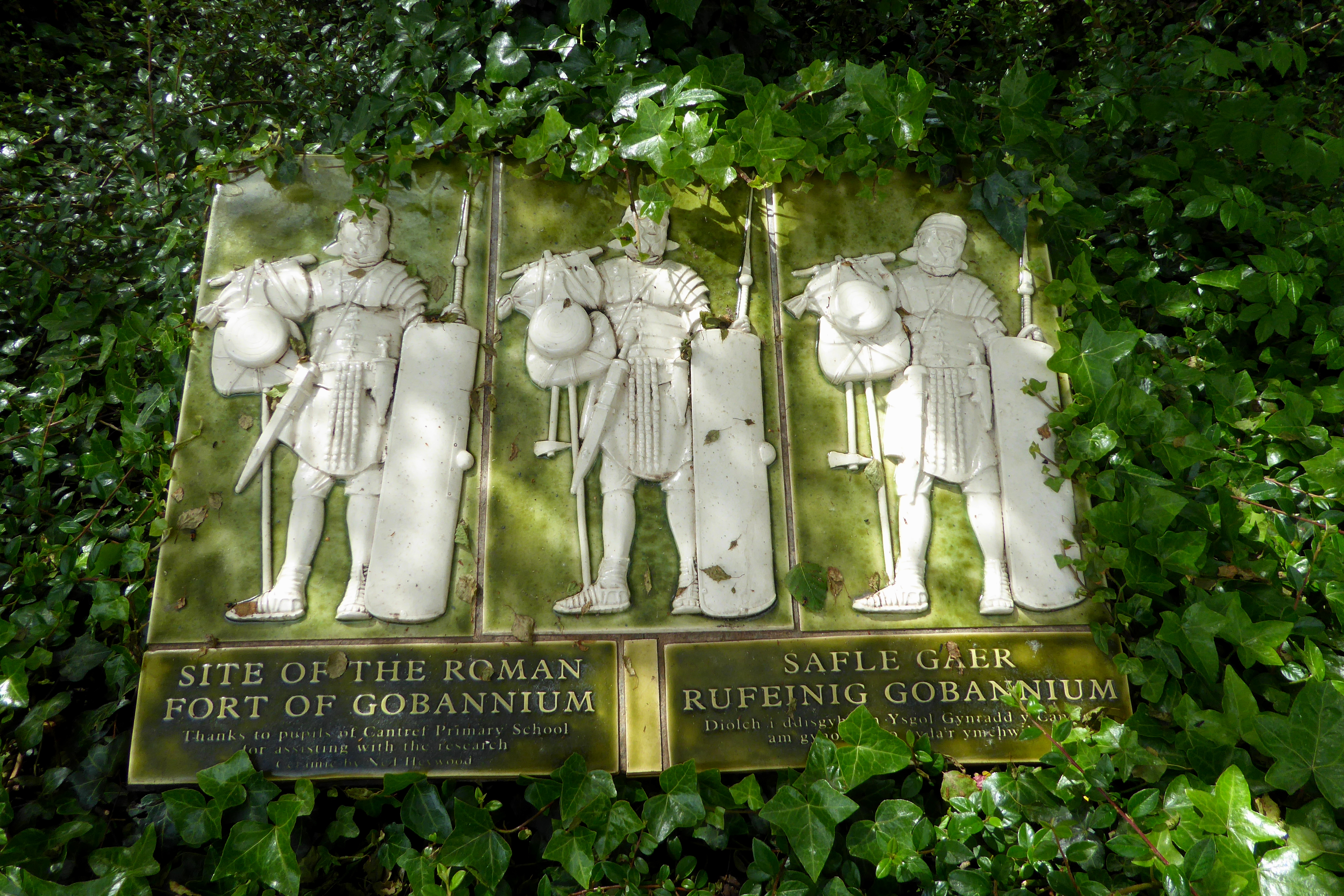
Plaque along Castle Street marking the existence of Gobannium

Gobannium was a Roman fort and civil settlement or Castra established by the Roman legions invading what was to become Roman Wales and lies today under the market town of Abergavenny, Monmouthshire in south east Wales.

== Documentary evidence ==
Gobannium was first recorded in the Antonine Itinerary of the late 2nd century AD as 'Gobannio' sited some 12 miles from Burrium, (modern Usk) and 22 miles south of Magnis (near Kenchester, Herefordshire). Gobannium is also mentioned in the Ravenna Cosmography as 'Bannio', sited between Isca Augusta the major legionary fortress covering South Wales (Caerleon) further down the River Usk, and Bremia (Llanio, Ceredigion).

The name is thought to have a Celtic or Brythonic language origin and linked to Gobannus and Gofannon, and may mean 'the river of the blacksmiths'.

== Location ==
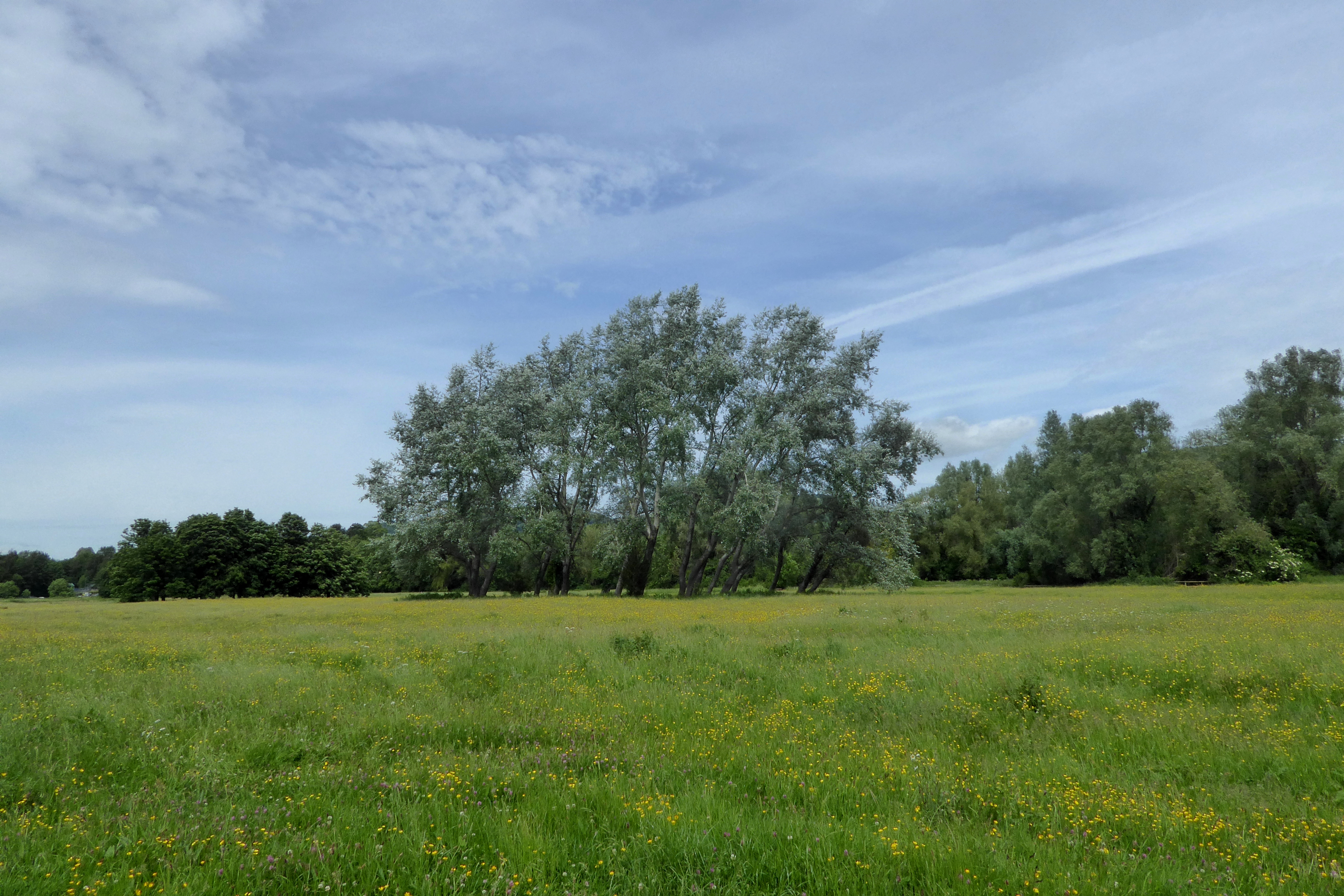
View across the meadows which extend beneath where Gobannium once stood, on the northern side of the River Usk

Gobannium lies in the broad valley of the River Usk surrounded by hills and mountains, such as the Sugar Loaf Mountain, Wales, the Skirrid and the Blorenge, just before the valley narrows and the site has some archaeological evidence of human activity dating from the British Iron Age and earlier British Bronze Age. The valley was certainly used as a major prehistoric route through the land of the Silures between the coastal plain of the Caldicot and Wentloog Levels and the Brecon Beacons.

The invading Romans, under Publius Ostorius Scapula, needed a suitable staging post at this site between their major legionary bases and a string of forts in the interior, such as Y Gaer, Brecon and with links northwards to Watling Street, eastwards to Blestium (Monmouth) and Glevum (Gloucester).

== Site ==
The Romans selected a spur forming a steep incline above the nearby River Usk at a point where the smaller River Gavenny meets it - a naturally defensible site that may well have been settled or fortified previously and that commands clear views across the surrounding landscape. Level ground on the spur offered the scope for a fort layout and subsequently space for an additional civil settlement.

== Artefacts and excavations ==
Artefacts from the site include stamped roof tiles showing the stamp of the Legio II Augusta, based at Isca Augusta, well worn Roman currency such as a coin from the Augustan period, sixteen pieces of high status Samian ware pottery sherds, items of bronze military equipment compatible with Celtic Roman auxiliary troops, plus rubbish pits.

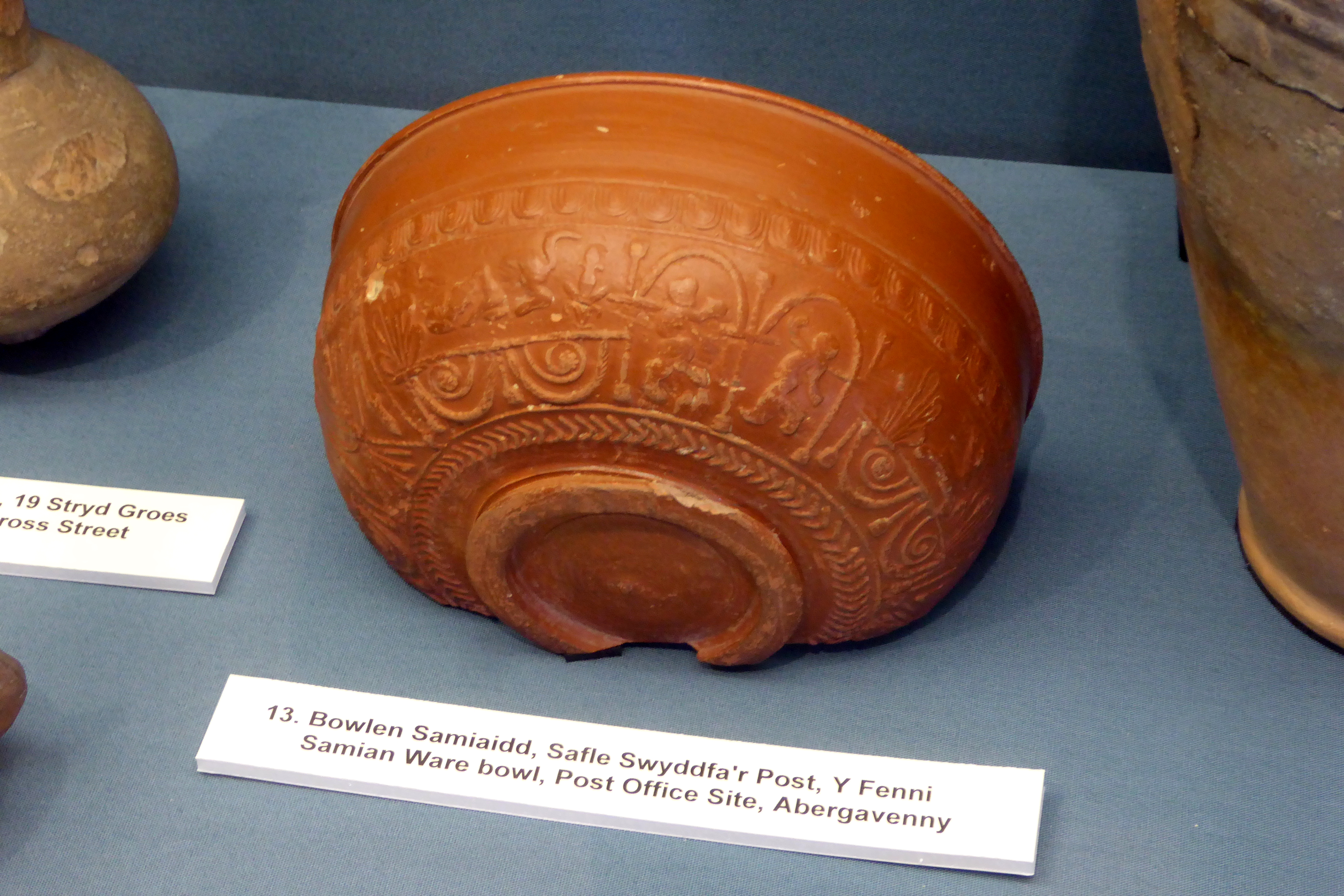
A Samian ware vessel recovered from Abergavenny, on display in Abergavenny Museum

The excavations that have taken place have been small in scope and piecemeal, often in the face of redevelopment of buildings and amenities in the modern town centre. Digs in advance of the building of the new post office and telephone exchange in the centre of Abergavenny between 1962 and 1969 found evidence of a military ditch system, timber buildings with postholes, small granaries for storing grain over winters and turf and timber ramparts. Further explorations over the years since 1970 have revealed wattle and daub walling, clay sling or sling shot ammunition and further rubbish pits.

In 2002, a metal detectorist in a field of Pentwyn Triley Farm unearthed an upturned vessel. A zoomorphic handle was found detached at the bottom of the pit. The form of this handle has led to the cup being called the Abergavenny 'Leopard Cup'. It was displayed shortly in Abergavenny and is currently displayed in the National Museum and Galleries Wales (Cardiff). Discussion of its precise origins and usage is ongoing.

Some of the artefacts recovered to date can be seen at Abergavenny Museum within Abergavenny Castle.
