= St Mary's Church, Llanfair-ar-y-bryn =

Church in Carmarthenshire, Wales

Coordinates: 52°00′04″N 3°47′36″W

St Mary's Church
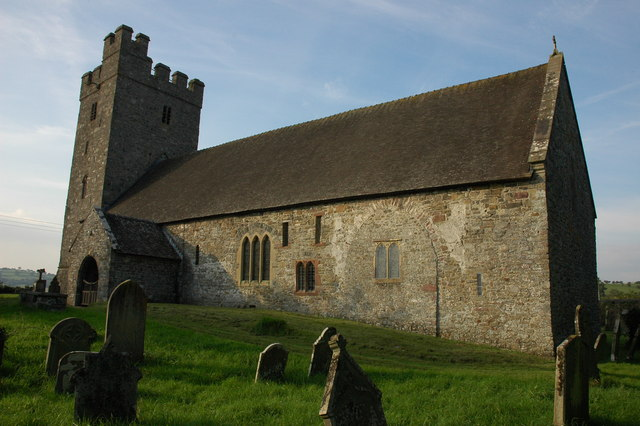
- St Mary's Church
- Location: Llandovery, Carmarthenshire
- Country: Wales
- Denomination: Anglican

History
- Founded: Medieval

Architecture
- Heritage designation: Grade I
- Designated: 3 August 1966
- Architectural type: Church

St Mary's Church is a Church in Wales place of worship near Llandovery, Carmarthenshire, Wales. It was formerly the parish church of Llanfair-ar-y-bryn but was replaced in that function by a new church in a more central location. The present building dates from the 12th century. It has a large churchyard and is situated on a small hill to the north of the town. It was designated a Grade I listed building on 3 August 1966.

== Building ==
St Mary's was built inside Alabum, a Roman fort, on top of Llanfair Hill. A monastic cell from around 1126 was already on the site before building commenced. It is one of the largest medieval churches in the county, and has a substantial tower at the west end with a square stair-tower on its northeastern corner. The church is built of rubble stone with plain tiles on the roof. Earlier dressings are mostly in red sandstone, while nineteenth century dressings are in Bath stone. The nave and chancel are directly connected to the tower, to the porch on the south side and to the vestry and organ chamber on the north. The hymn writer William Williams Pantycelyn (1717–1791) is buried in the churchyard, where there is a memorial to him.

The church was designated a Grade I listed building on 3 August 1966, as an example of "a substantial medieval church with intricate history of building and change from the C12 to the C16, with fine W tower and high degree of survival of medieval architectural features". The Royal Commission on the Ancient and Historical Monuments of Wales curates the archaeological, architectural and historic records for this church. These include a file of information concerning wall paintings, colour transparencies and black and white postcards.

In summer 2023, stone paving slabs from the historic pathway in the churchyard between the lychgate and the church's entranceway were stolen by thieves. Due to the costs of maintaining the ancient building, the vicar said this was "the last thing" the church needed.
