= Forden Gaer =

- Location within Powys
- 52.582151°N 3.170358°W
- Location: Forden, Powys, Wales

History
- Founded: c. 75 - 80 AD
- Abandoned: 4th century AD

Forden Gaer, Y Gaer, Caer Flos and Lavrobrinta are respective English, Welsh and possible Latin names for the Roman fort in the township of Thornbury, in the parish of Forden, in the old county of Montgomeryshire, which now forms part of Powys, Wales . The fort lies on the E bank of the Severn a short distance N of Montgomery, and covers an important crossing of the river close to the historic ford at Rhydywhyman. It is likely that this is the same fort as Lavrobrinta, which is mentioned in the Ravenna Cosmography. The fort lies on the Roman Road between Wroxeter and Caersws. The defences were originally of earth, subsequently revetted with a timber-laced rampart of clay. Some internal buildings may have been of stone. The fort was established ca. A.D. 75-80 and was not finally abandoned before the reign of Valentinian I (A.D. 364–378). The finds are in the Powysland Museum, Welshpool.

== Bibliography ==
- F. N. Pryce & T. D. Pryce, Excavations of the Powysland Club at the Forden Gaer, Archaeologia Cambrensis 82 (1927) 333–54.
- The Forden Gaer. Second Interim Report, ibid. 84 (1929) 100–39;
- The Forden Gaer. Third Interim Report, ibid. 85 (1930) 115–30;
- P. J. Casey in V. E. Nash-Williams, The Roman Frontier in Wales (2d ed. by M. G. Jarrett 1969) 85–88.
- N W Jones in Burnham B C and Davies J L, Roman Frontier in Wales and the Marches, RCHMW, 2010, 243–245.
