= Luentinum =

Roman fort and mining settlement in Carmarthenshire, Wales

Coordinates: 52.0452°N 3.9616°W

Luentinum or Loventium refers to the Roman fort at Pumsaint, Carmarthenshire. The 1.9 hectares (4.7 acres) site lies either side of the A482 in Pumsaint and was in use from the mid 70s AD to around 120 AD. It may have had particular functions associated with the adjacent Dolaucothi Gold Mines. It formed part of a network of at least 30 forts across Wales, such as Llandovery, Bremia/Llanio near Llanddewi Brefi, and the fort at Llandeilo. The Roman road Sarn Helen, which runs past the Llanio and Llandovery forts was nearby.

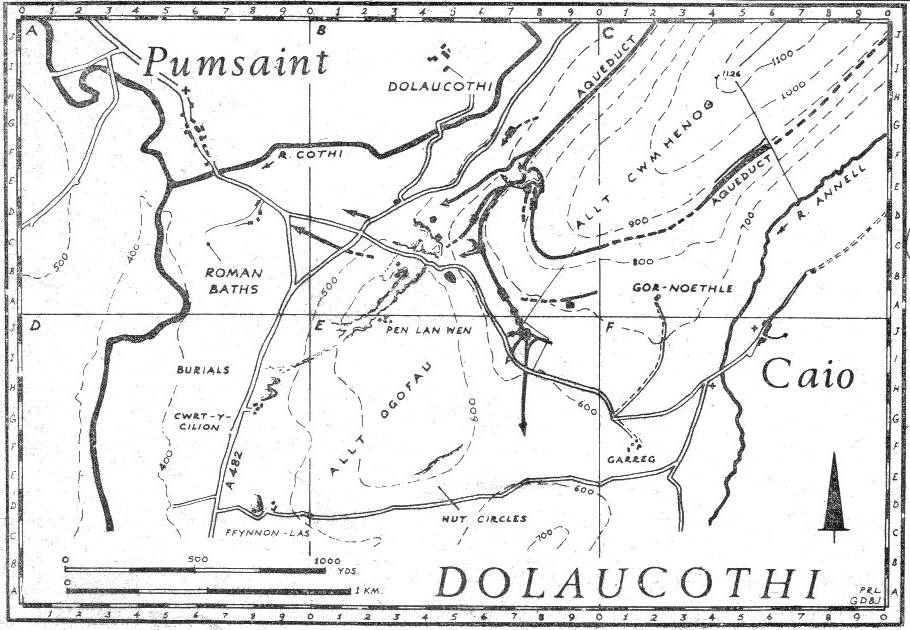
Map of the gold mine

The name Luentinum is mentioned in Ptolemy's, 2nd century AD 'Geography', and is thought to relate to washing in reference to the Pumsaint gold mines. The fort appears to have been founded as a square 5½ acre (2.25 hectare) Roman auxiliary fort controlling the adjoining gold mines, around AD 75 when Frontinus was governor of Roman Britain and active in subduing the Silures of Roman Wales. The fort had an earthen rampart and double ditch. The date of first construction was determined from a Samian ware inkwell with stamp found in the early 1970s where the river bank had cut into the fort. On the east bank of the River Cothi, a few hundred yards south of Pumsaint village, was discovered a small double-roomed building with hypocaust and plain tessellated floors. It was probably the military bath-house. The internal buildings of the fort underwent a number of rebuildings until the fort was abandoned around 140. The surrounding civilian vicus then took over the area and, no doubt, also the mines. The fort is situated about halfway between similar forts at Llandovery to the east and Bremia or Llanio to the west, with Llandeilo to the south.

The fort was at the meeting point of several Roman roads in mid Wales. These were the Ffordd Fleming which ran from Loventium to Menapia (St David's), the more southerly Via Julia which also came from St David's and met the Sarn Helen near Loventium, and the Hen Fford (old road) which came from Maridunum (Carmarthen).

The name Luentinum appears only in Ptolemy's Geographia. It appears to be related to the Brythonic word for 'washing', as suggested by George Boon of the National Museum of Wales. It refers to the hushing (hydraulic mining) methods used on the site for extraction of the gold, and the washing tables used to concentrate the gold dust and nuggets. It is one of the best examples of the application of advanced Roman technology in Britain, and compares with other Roman mines in Europe such as those at Verespatak in Transylvania and Las Médulas in northern Spain. It is a site of international significance and importance.

== See also ==
- Dolaucothi
- Bremia and Llandovery, nearby forts
