= Ravenna Cosmography =

List of place-names compiled by an anonymous Ravennate cleric

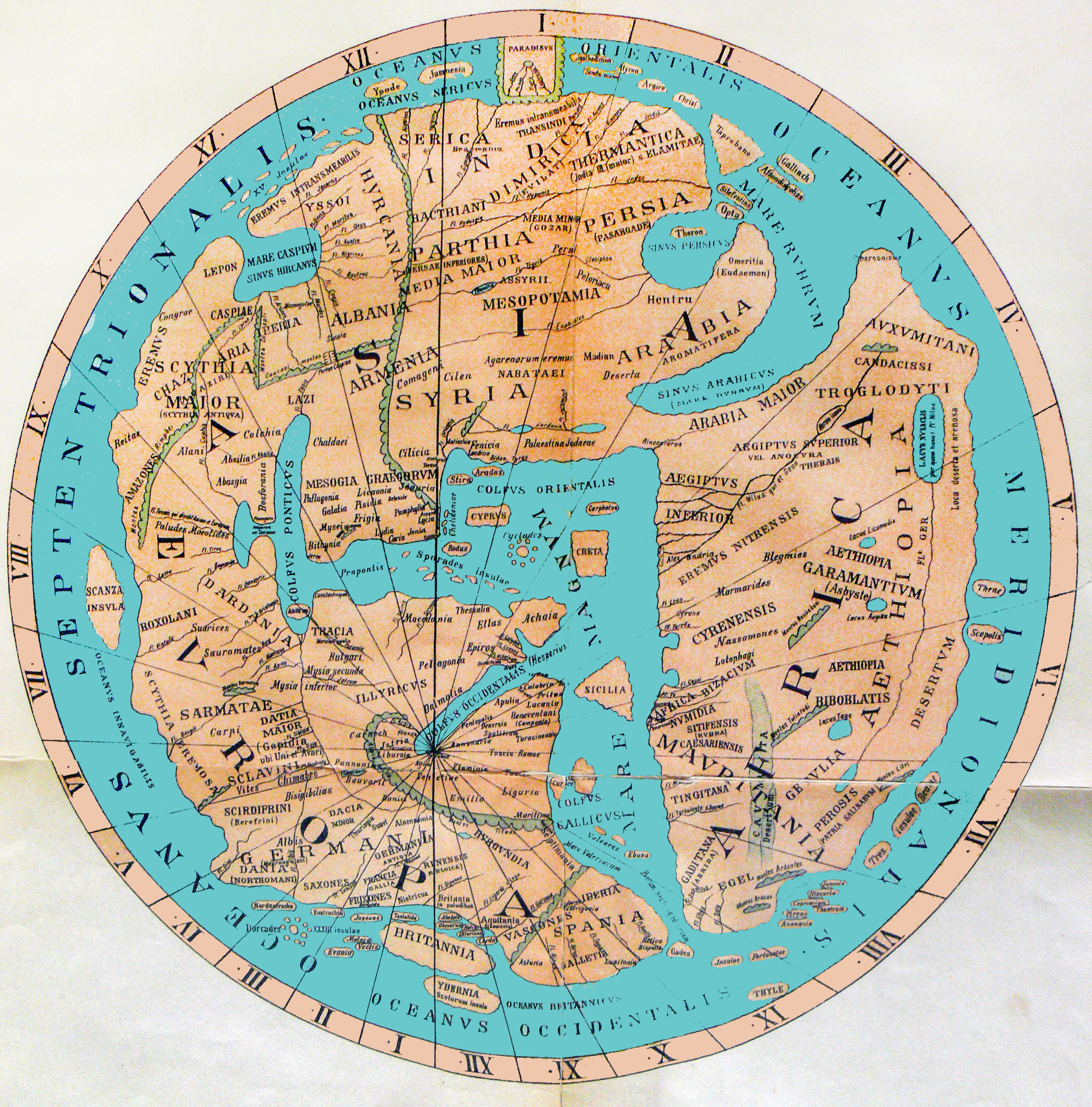
Map based on Ravenna Cosmography.

The Ravenna Cosmography (Latin: Ravennatis Anonymi Cosmographia, lit. "The Cosmography of the Unknown Ravennate") is a work describing the known world from India to Ireland, compiled by an anonymous cleric in Ravenna in around 700. It consists of five books describing Asia, Africa, and Europe in prose and with lists of toponyms. Textual evidence indicates that the author may have used maps as source material.

== Dating ==
All surviving manuscripts are late medieval copies dating from the 13th to 14th centuries. The Cosmography refers to "Saint" Isidore of Seville, who was canonised upon his death in 636; the latest datable reference in the work. The Muslim conquest of the Iberian peninsula is, however, not mentioned, which Rivet & Smith (1979) suggest would normally have been within the Cosmographer's scope, therefore creating a terminus ante quem bracket of around 711. However, they do also note that Saint Isidore was relatively unknown outside of Spain until Christians were forced to flee following the Moorish incursions.

Stolte, writing in 1956, argued that the cosmography was finished around 732.

== Publication history ==
=== Manuscripts ===
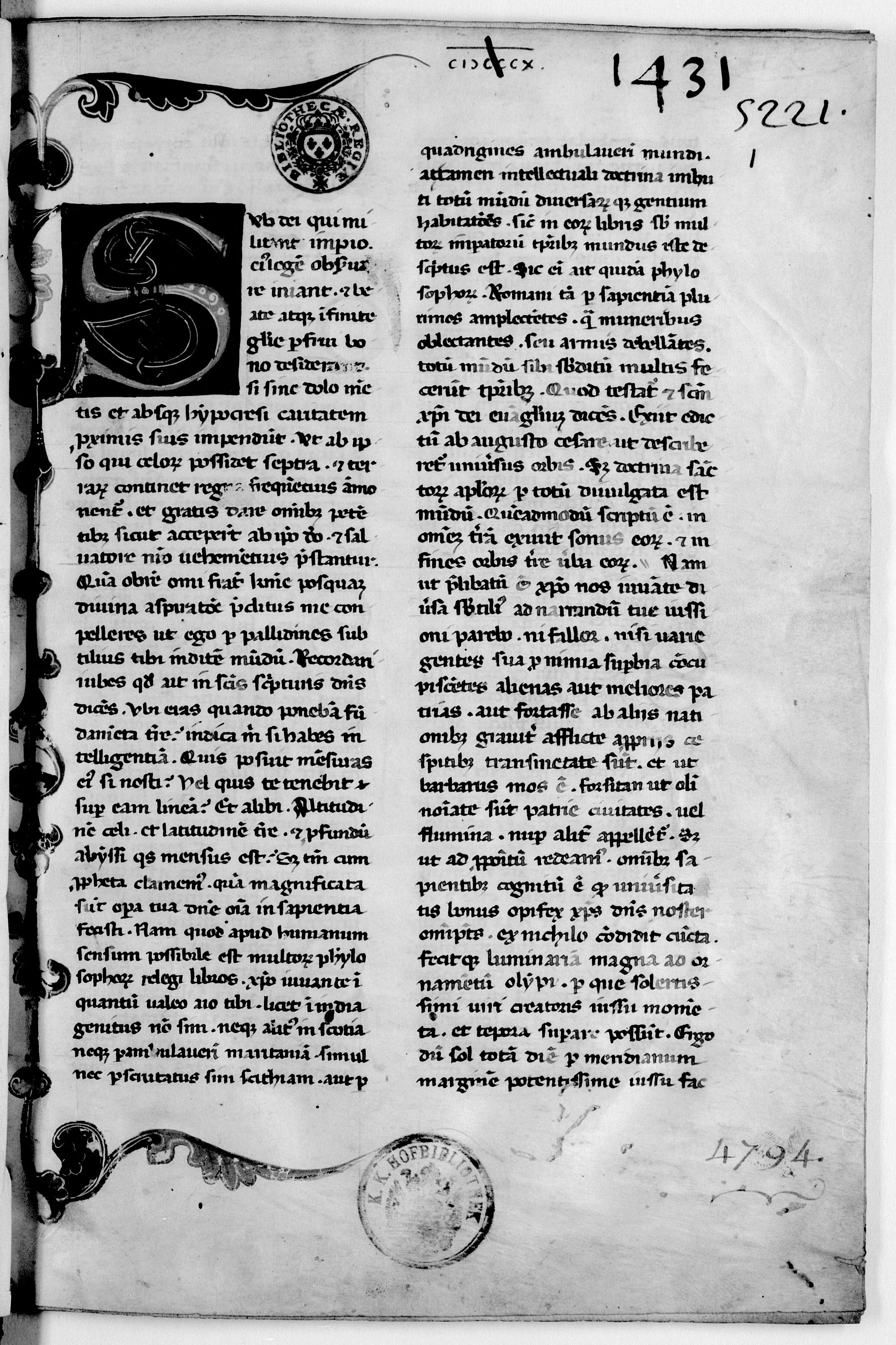
Folio 1r of the BnF manuscript of the Cosmography, sporting an illuminated capital "S": "Sub dei qui militant imperio, eius legem observare iniant et beate"

There are three extant prototype manuscript copies of the Cosmography:

Manuscripts of the Ravenna Cosmography
Siglum	Library	Shelfmark	Date (century)	Source
A (V)	Vatican	Urbanus Latinus 961	14th	
B (P)	Bibliothèque Nationale	Latin 4794	13th	
C (B)	Basel University Library	F.V. 6	14th	

Pinder & Parthey (1860) place B (P) as the earliest recension, from which descend A (V) and then C (B).

Fitzpatrick-Matthews (2022) places the manuscripts in a stemma whereby V, P and B are all descendents of a common ancestor, X, which through the c.8th century archetype is a cousin of the Guido Geographica.

In addition to the three main manuscripts, the Vatican Library also holds a document containing excerpts from the Cosmography made by Riccobaldus Ferrariensis, and there is a copy of the Paris manuscript held in Leiden.

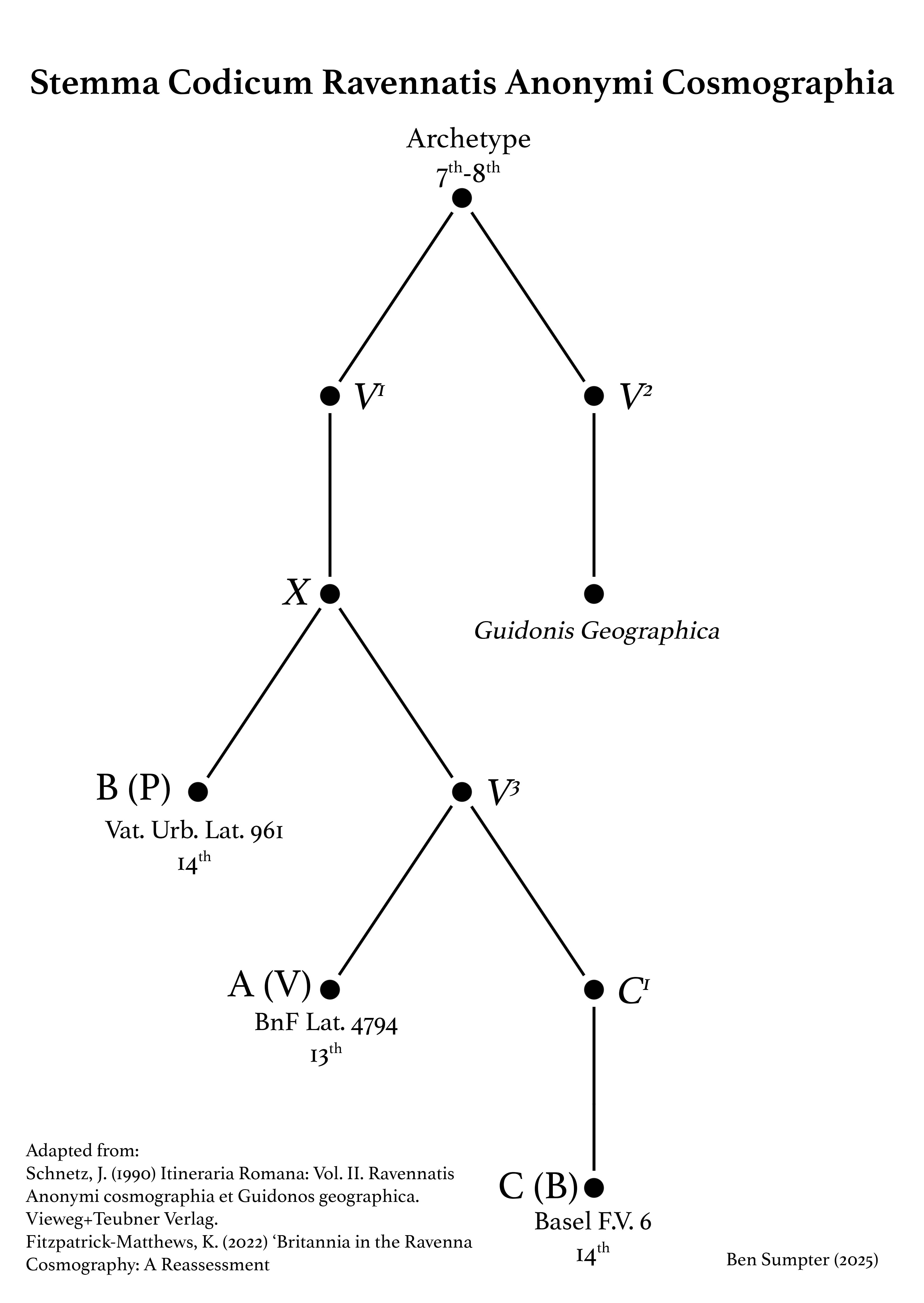
Stemma codicum for the Ravenna Cosmography, demonstrating its relationship to the Guidonis Geographica.

The Vatican manuscript presents the text in two columns, with placenames being capitalised and terminated by a stop. A small number of the words have been abbreviated. The Paris manuscript also uses two columns, capitalisation and stops, but has many more abbreviations than either of the other two. The text is divided into sections by paragraph marks. The Basle manuscript only has a single column, and is more difficult to read than the others. It has more abbreviations than the Vatican copy, but fewer than the Paris copy. There is some evidence that the author has tried to correct or clarify words which were not clear in the original, and there are no stops to separate the place names in the lists, but there are underlined headings to divide up the sections.

=== Printed Editions ===
The Vatican copy was used as the source for the first publication of the manuscript in 1688 by Porcheron. Pinder & Parthey published the text in 1860, basing it on the Vatican and Paris editions, which he believed to be more reliable than the Basle edition. Parts of the text, notably that covering Britain, have been published by others, including Richmond and Crawford in 1949, but their document showed little regard for which of the manuscripts provided the information. However, it contained photographs of the relevant sections from all three manuscripts, which enabled Keith Fitzpatrick-Matthews to reconstruct the text from scratch in 2013 (revised in 2020) for his reassessment of its importance for British geography. The work by Pinder & Parthey (1860) covered the whole document, and was republished in 1990.

In a paper by Franz Staab, published in 1976, he noted that the original author claimed to have used works by three others, Athanarid, Heldebald and Marcomir, in the compilation of his own work.

== Content ==
The Cosmography is comprised 5 books, the first being an introduction followed by 4 books of toponym gazetteers and short descriptions.

Contents of the Ravenna Cosmography
Book	Chapters	Description of Contents
1	18	General introduction and description of the known world.
2	21	Asia: India, Bactria, Mesopotamia, Assyria, Armenia, Syria, Ethiopia, Egypt,
3	12	North Africa: Egypt, Numidia, Ethiopia, Mauritania
4	46	Europe: Scythia, Greece, Germania, Gaul, Italy, Belgium, Brittany, Spain
5	33	List of cities and islands around the mediterranean in the style of a periplos, summary of the work, description of the Atlantic Coast, British Isles.

=== British section ===
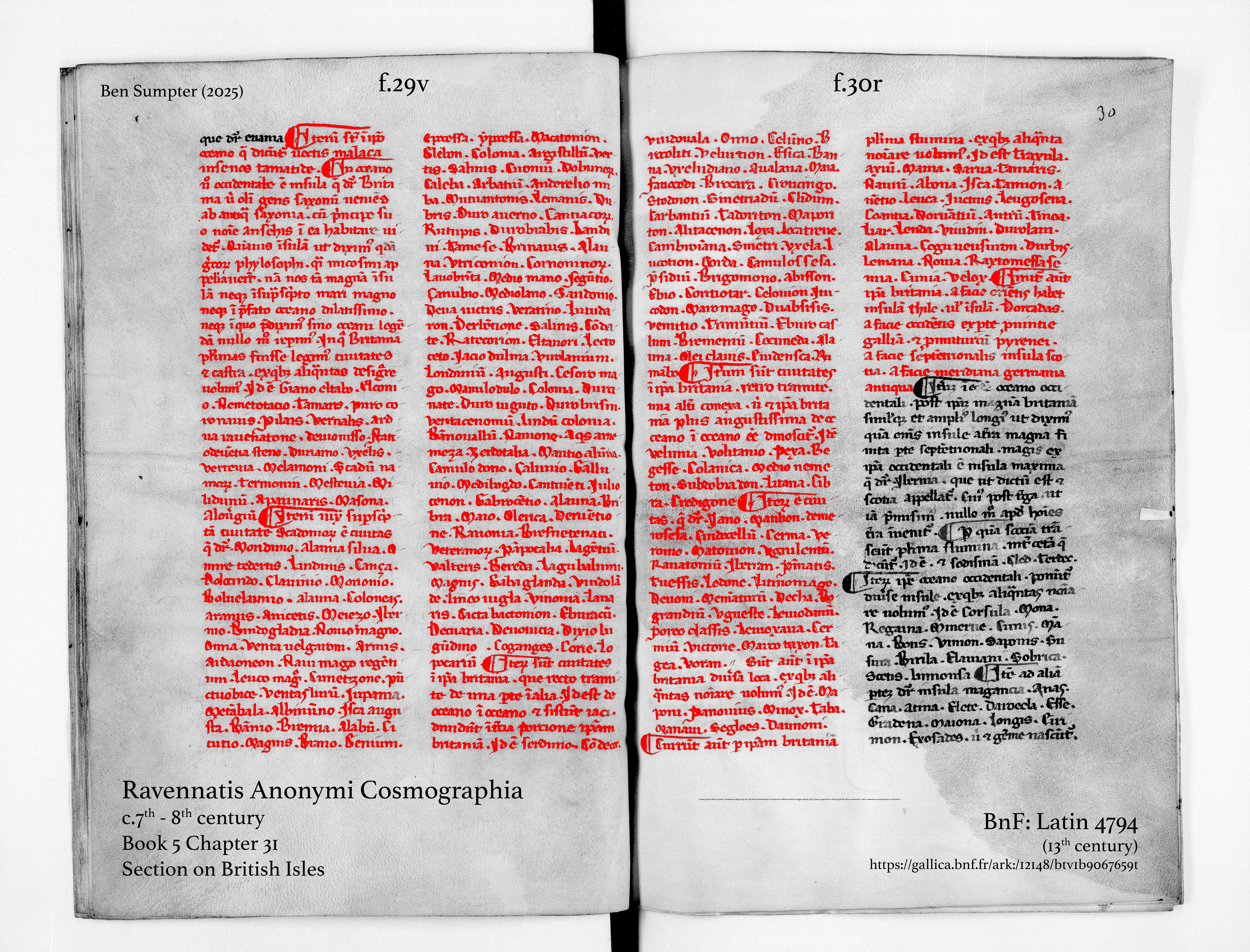
BnF Latin 4794 ff.29v-30r Ravenna Cosmography, with the British section annotated.

The section covering mainland Britain is found in the last 3 chapters of book 5. Most is contained in chapter 31, with a brief description of the surrounding islands at the end of chapter 30. Ireland is described in chapter 32, with Brittany and the semi-mythical Thule in the final chapter, 33.

The naming of places in Roman Britain has traditionally relied on Ptolemy's Geography, the Antonine Itinerary and the Peutinger Table, as the Cosmography was seen as full of corruptions, with the ordering of the lists of placenames being haphazard. However, there are more entries in the Cosmography than in the other documents, and so it has been studied more recently. The antiquary Roger Gale, writing in 1709, was the first to attempt to use it as a source for Romano-British place names, but early attempts relied on the similarity between ancient and modern names, and this method was seen to be suspect by the mid-19th century. Archaeological investigations were uncovering sites that had evidence of occupation in the Roman period, and this correlation became important. The Antonine Itinerary and Richard of Cirencester's de Situ Britanniae were increasingly used to corroborate entries, until Richard's work was found to be an 18th-century hoax by Charles Bertram. The Cosmography remained relatively impenetrable until the mid-20th century.

In 1949, Sir Ian Richmond and O G S Crawford published a paper they had originally submitted to Archaeologia, which suggested that the sources for the document had included maps or road books, and that many place names described geographical features. The book was seen as a significant advance in the study both of the document and of Romano-British placenames. Louis Dillemann's work, which was translated by Professor Colin Smith and published in Archaeologia in 1979, was the first time that the theories of J Schnetz had been summarised for an English-speaking audience, while A. L. F. Rivet and Colin Smith used their study of the document to publish The Place-Names of Roman Britain in the same year.

Part of the difficulty with the text is its corruption, which probably results from the author failing to understand his sources or not appreciating the purpose for which they were written. His sources may have been of poor quality, resulting in many curious-looking names appearing in the lists. Equally, there are some obvious omissions, although the author was not attempting to produce a complete list of places, as his introduction states: "In that Britain we read that there were many civitates and forts, of which we wish to name a few." The suggestion that he was using maps is bolstered by phrases such as "next to" which occur frequently, and at one point he states: "where that same Britain is seen to be narrowest from Ocean to Ocean." Richmond and Crawford were the first to argue that rather than being random, the named places are often clustered around a central point, or spread out along a single road. For most of England, the order seems to follow a series of zig-zags, but this arrangement is less obvious for the south-west and for Scotland.

As an indication of the problems of dealing with the text, there are a total of 315 names in the section covering Britain. All three manuscripts agree on the spelling of 200 of these. The Basle and Vatican documents agree on the spelling of a further 50; there are 33 more common to the Basle and Paris documents, and 17 more which appear in the Paris and Vatican documents. There are 8 names for which there is no agreement between the three sources, and 7 names missing from the Paris copy where the other two agree.

British Sections in the Manuscripts
Manuscript	Folios (British Section)
A (V)	45v-47r
B (P)	29v-30v
C (B)	107r-108v

==== Latin Text ====
After Schnetz (1990), locations identified after Fitzpatrick-Matthews (2022) and Rivet & Smith (1979). See also Richmond & Crawford (1949) for images of all the prototype manuscripts:

===== Chapter 30: British Islands =====
Iterum est insula quae dicitur Euania

Iterum sunt in ipso oceano quae dicuntur

Vectis Malaca Insenos Taniatide.

===== Chapter 31: British Mainland =====
In oceano vero occidentale est insula quae dicitur Britania, ubi olim gens Saxonum veniens ab antiqua Saxonia cum principe suo nomine Ansehis modo habitare videtur; quamvis insulam, ut diximus, quidam Grecorum phylosophi quasi imicosmin appellaverunt; nam nos tarn magnam insulam neque in supra scripto Mari Magno neque in praefato oceano dilatissimo neque in quo praediximus sino oceani legendam nullo modo reperimus.

In qua Britania plurimas fuisse legimus civitates [et castra], ex quibus aliquantas designare volumus, id est

Giano Eltabo Elconio Nemetotatio Tamaris Puro coronauis Pilais Vernilis Ardua rauenatone Deuionisso Statio deuen tia steno Duriarno Vxelis Verteuia Melamoni Scadumnamo Termonin Mesteuia Milidunum Apaunaris Masona Alouergium

Iterum iuxta suprascriptam ciuitatem Scadonamorum est ciuitas quae dicitur

Moriduno Alauna Silua Omire tedertis Lindinis Canza Dolocindo Clauinio Morionio Boluelaunio Alauna Colonias Aramis Anicetis Melezo Ibernio Bindogladia Nouiomago Onna Venta uelgarom Armis Ardaoneon Nauimago Regentium Leucomago Cunetzone Punctuobice Ventasluru Iupania Metambala Albinumno Isca augusta Bannio Bremia Alabum Cicutio Magnis Brano Genium Epocessa Ypocessa Macatonion Glebon Colonia Argistillum Vertis Salinis Cironium Dobuno Caleba Arbatiu Anderelionuba Mutuantonis Lemanis Dubris Duroauerno Cantiaco Rutupis Durobrabis Landini Tamese Brinauis Alauna Vtriconion Cornouiorum Lauobrinta Mediomano Seguntio Canubio Mediolano Sandonio Deua uictris Veratino Lutudaron Derbentione Salinis Condate Ratecorion Eltauori Lectoceto Iaciodulma Virolanium Londinium augusti Cesaromago Manulodulo colonia Durcinate Durouiguto Durobrisin Ventacenomū Lindum colonia Bannouallum Nauione Aquis arnemeza Zerdotalia Mantio Alicuna Camulodono Caluuio Galluuio Medibogdo Cantauenti Iuliocenon Gabrocentio Alauna Bribra Maio Olerica Deruentione Rauonia Bresnetenaci Veterano Pampo calia Lagentium Valteris Bereda Lagubalium Magnis Gabaglanda Vindolande Lincouigla Vinouia Lauaris Cactabactonion Eburacum Decuaria Deuouicia Dixiolugunduno Coganges Corie Lopocarium

Iterum sunt ciuitates in ipsa Britania que recto tramite de una parte in alia id est de oceano in oceano & sistunt iaci diuidut in tertia porcione ipsam Britaniam. Id est

Serduno Condecor Vindouala Onno Celumno Brocoliti Velurticon Esica Banna Vxelludamo Aualaua Maia Fanococidi Brocara Croucingo Stodoion Smetriadū Clindum Carbantiū Tadoriton Maporiton Alithacenon Loxa Locatreue Cambroianna Smetri Vxela Lucotion Corda Camulossesa Presidiū Brigomono Abisson Ebio Coritiotar Celouion Itucodon Maromago Duabsissis Venutio Trimuntiium Eburocaslum Bremenium Coccuueda Alauna Oleaclauis Euidensca Rumabo

Iterum sunt ciuitates in ipsa Britania recto tramite una alteri conexa ubi et ipsa Britania plus angustissima de occeano in occeano esse dinoscitur. Id est

Velunia Volitanio Pexa Begesse Colanica Medionemeton Subdobiadon Litana Cibra Credigone

Iterum est ciuitas quae dicitur

Lano Maulion Demerosesa Cindocellum Cerma Veromo Matouion Vgrulentum Rauatoniu Iberran Pinnatis Tuessis Lodone Litinomago Deuoni Memanturum Decha Bograndium Vgueste Leuiodanum Poreo classis Leuioxaua Cermium Victorie Marcotaxon Tagea Voran

Sunt autem in ipsa britania diversa loca, ex quibus aliꝗnta nominare uolumus. id est:

Maponi Mixa Panouius Minox Taba Manaui Segloes Dannoni

Currunt autem per ipsam britaniam plurima flumina, ex quibus aliquanta nominare volumus. id est:

Traxula Axium Mauia Sarna Tamaris Nauru Abona Isca Tamion Auentio Leuca Iuctius Leugosena Coantia Doruantium Anaua Bdora Nouitia Adron Certis nassa Intraum Antrum Tinea Liar Lenda Viuidin Durolaui Alauna Coguueusuron Durbis Lemana Nouia Raxtomessasenua Cunia Velox

Finit autem ipsa britania. A facie orientis habet insulam thile ultra insulas dorcadas; a facie occidentis ex parte provincie gallia et promunturium pyrenei; a facie septemtrionalis insula scotia; a facie meridiana germania antiqua.

===== Chapter 32 Ireland =====
Iterum in eodem oceano occidentali post ipsam magnam britaniam simulque et amplius longius ut diximus quam omnes insulae altra magna finita parte septemtrionali magis ex ipsa occidentali est insula maxima quae dicitur ibernia; quae ut dictum est et scotia appellatur. cuius post terga ut iam praemisimus nullo modo apud homines terra inuenitur.

Per quam scotiam transeunt plurima flumina. Inter cetera que dicuntur. Id est

Et Sodi Sinam Cled Terdec

Iterum in ipso oceano occidentali ponuntur diversae insulae. Ex quibus aliquantas nominare volumus. Id est

Corsula Mona Regaina Minerue Cunis Manna Botis Vinion Saponis Susura Birila Elauiana Sobrica Scetis Linnonsa

Item ad aliam partem dicitur insula

Magantia Anas Cana Atina Elete Daroeda Esse Grandena Maiona Longis Eirimon Exosades ubi et gemmae nascuntur sicunt Legimus

Item in ipso oceano sunt numero insule triginta tres quae et dorcades appellantur. quae quamuis non existant omnes exculte attamen nomina illarum uolueramus Christo nobis iuvante designare. sed quia peccatis emergentibus suete a diuersis gentibus ipsa dominatur patria et ut barbarus mos est vari vocationes earum reliquimus nomina designandum.

===== Chapter 33: Brittanny =====
Sed iam expleta parte occidentali tamquam ad partem regredientes meridianam est insula post Equitaniam que dicitur

Ollarione Ratis Corda Noetoia

Iterum in ipso oceano dilatissimo, expleta, ut diximus, parte occidentali, id est regredientes a parte meridiana, procul a littore Spanie est insula que dicitur Thyle, de qua et Mantuanus ait inter reliqua, tibi serviet ultima Thyle.

== See also ==
- Antonine Itinerary
- Guido of Pisa's Geographica
- Ptolemy's Geography
- Tabula Peutingeriana
