= Pen-llwyn =

Village in Ceredigion, Wales

Coordinates: 52.406218°N 3.983093°W

- Location within Ceredigion
- OS grid reference: SN 6519 8054
  - Cardiff: 72.5 mi (116.7 km)
  - London: 175.4 mi (282.3 km)
- Community: Melindwr
- Principal area: Ceredigion
- Country: Wales
- Sovereign state: United Kingdom
- Post town: Aberystwyth
- Postcode district: SY23
- Police: Dyfed-Powys
- Fire: Mid and West Wales
- Ambulance: Welsh
- UK Parliament: Ceredigion Preseli
- Senedd Cymru – Welsh Parliament: Ceredigion

Pen-llwyn (also spelled as Penllwyn) is a hamlet in the community of Melindwr, Ceredigion, Wales, which is 72.5 miles (116.7 km) from Cardiff and 175.4 miles (282.3 km) from London. Pen-llwyn is represented in the Senedd by Elin Jones (Plaid Cymru) and is part of the Ceredigion Preseli constituency in the House of Commons.

== Etymology ==
The name derives from the welsh language meaning "the head of the grove".

== Notable people ==
- Thomas Cynfelyn Benjamin (1850–1925), Welsh language poet and congregational minister, was raised at Tanrallt, Pen-llwyn
- Lewis Edwards (1809–1887), educator and Nonconformist minister
- Owen Prys (1857–1934), academic and theologian, born here

== See also ==
- List of localities in Wales by population
