= Y Gaer =

Roman fort near Brecon, Wales

Y Gaer (Cicucium)
- Powys, Wales, UK
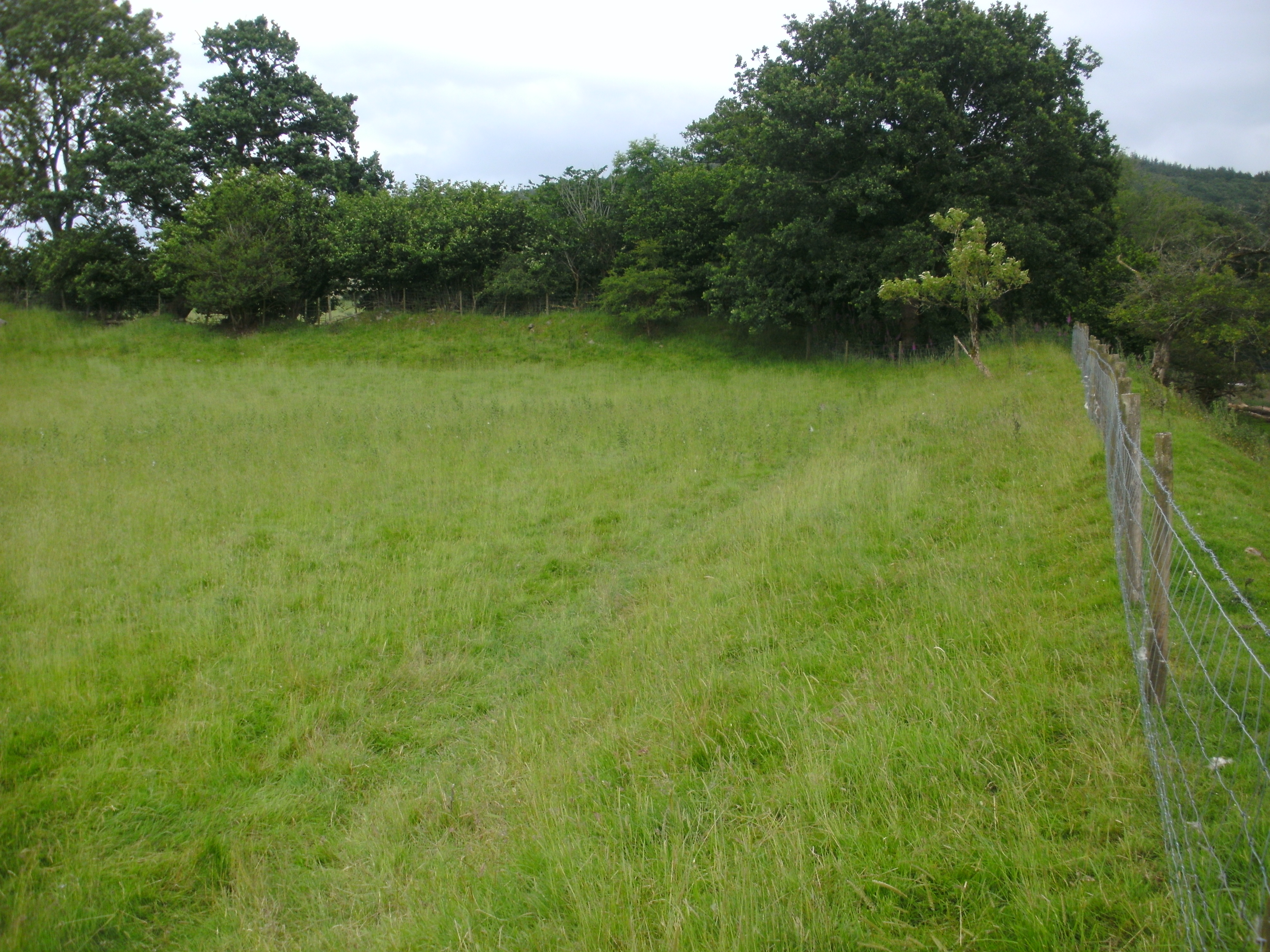
- Remains of the Roman fort

Location
- Location in Powys
- Coordinates: 51.9565°N 3.4517°W
- Grid reference: SO00332966

Y Gaer (Latin: Cicucium) is a Roman fort situated near modern-day Brecon in Mid Wales, United Kingdom. Y Gaer is located at grid reference SO00332966 (Landranger 160).

== History ==
Y Gaer was built around AD 75 and sits on a crossroads of Roman roads in the valley of the River Usk at a strategic point in Roman Wales, linking South Wales and Mid Wales. It was part of a chain of similar forts, such as Gobannium at Abergavenny, a day's march away down the Usk valley, and larger bases, such as Moridunum (Carmarthen) via Alabum (Llandovery), Cardiff Roman Fort to the south and Isca Augusta, Caerleon, the main base for the Roman legion locally.

According to some sources a lot of the stones from the fort were taken to create a castle at Brecon (Brecon Castle) around the year 1093.

The site was excavated in the 1920s by Sir Mortimer Wheeler, a prominent archaeologist of his day.

The fort was built for a contingent of up to 500 cavalrymen, recruited originally in Spain from the Vettones, and these Vettonian cavalry would have played a significant part in the conquest of the area held by the Silures.

Their early stables were wooden and their accommodation basic, protected by clay banks topped with a wooden palisade. This was rebuilt in the 2nd century AD by the Legio II Augusta and also shows signs of being repaired again in the 4th century.

== Y Gaer today ==
The site is in the care of Cadw. It lies on private farmland and Cadw provides no signposting to the site, which lies on the further side of the farm buildings at the end of the approach lane.

Visitors can see remnants of stone walls standing in parts to some 3 metres (9.8 ft) in height, part of three gatehouses and corner guard towers. Several artefacts have been removed to local museums, such as a tombstone of a young cavalryman called Candidus, held at the Y Gaer cultural hub in Brecon.

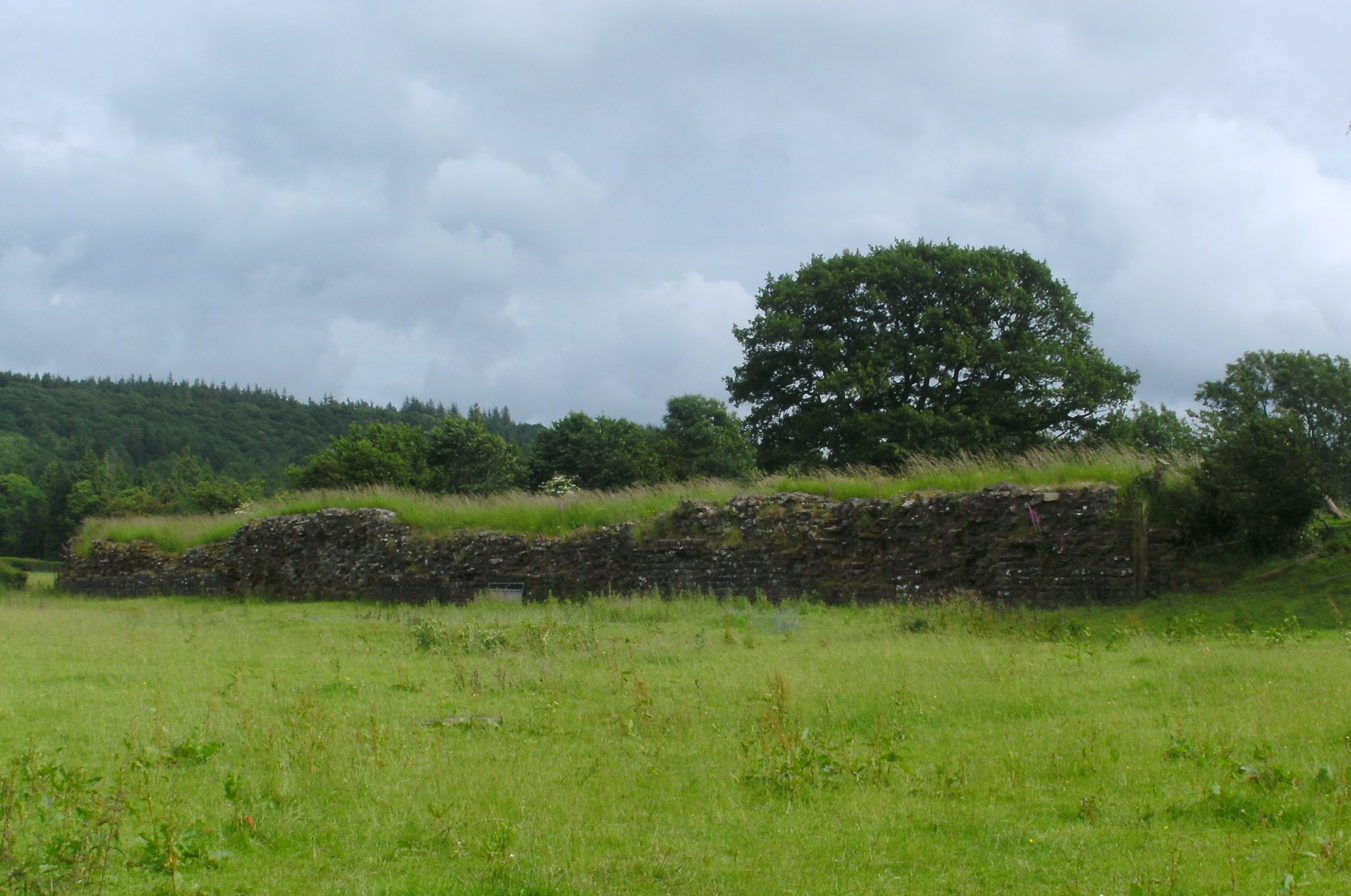
Remains of the North wall

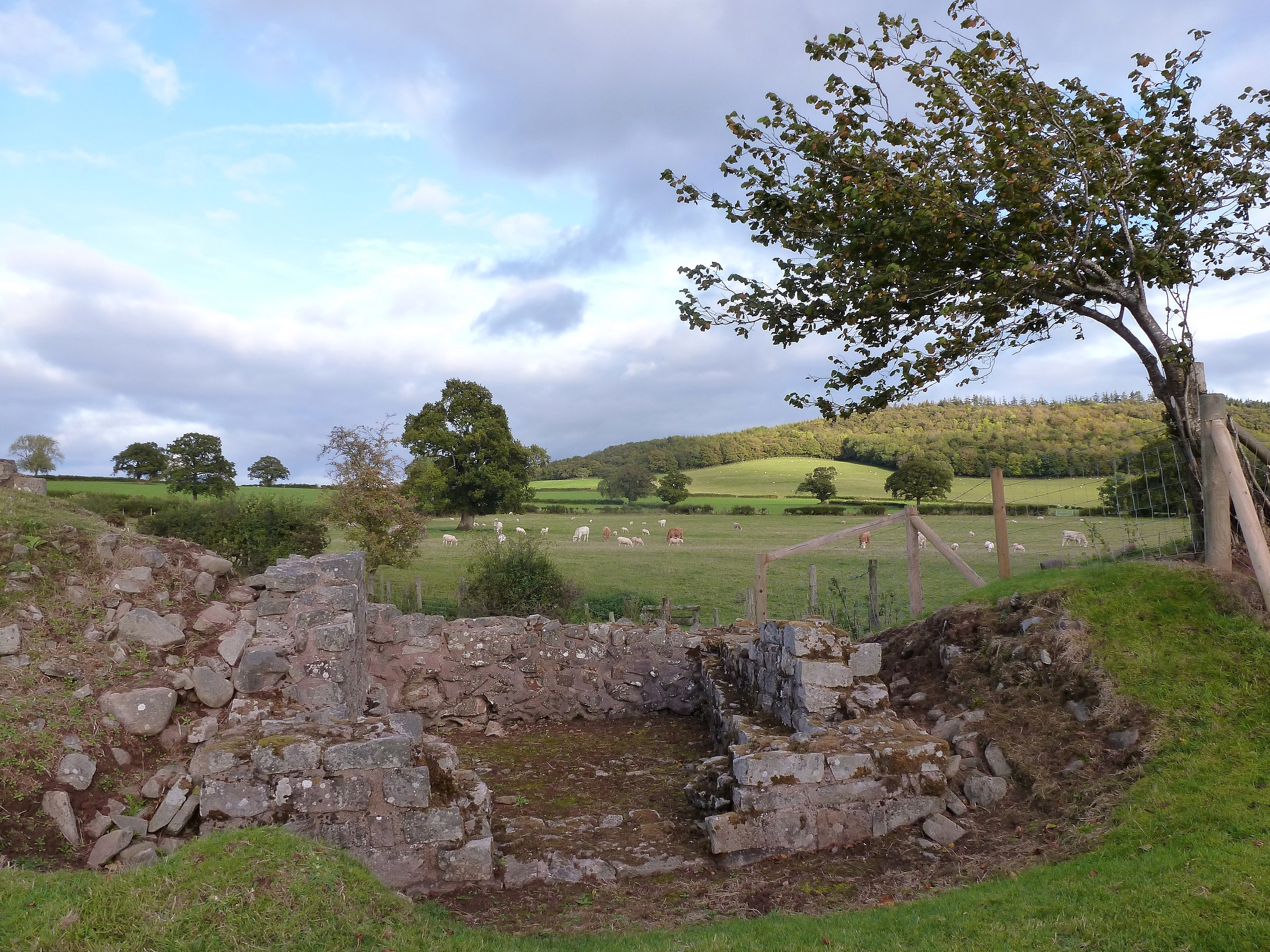
Foundations of the North East corner turret

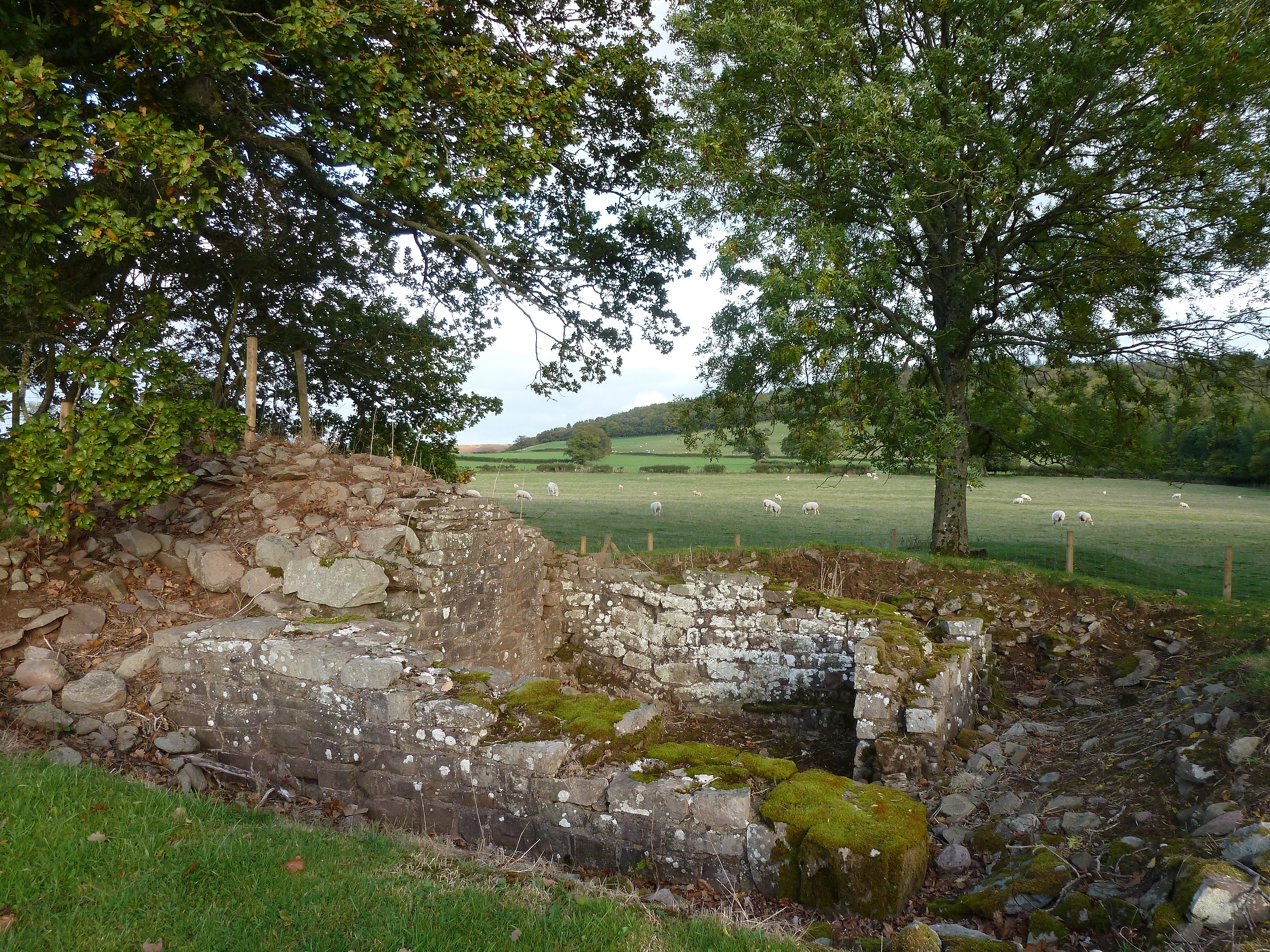
Foundations of the East gate

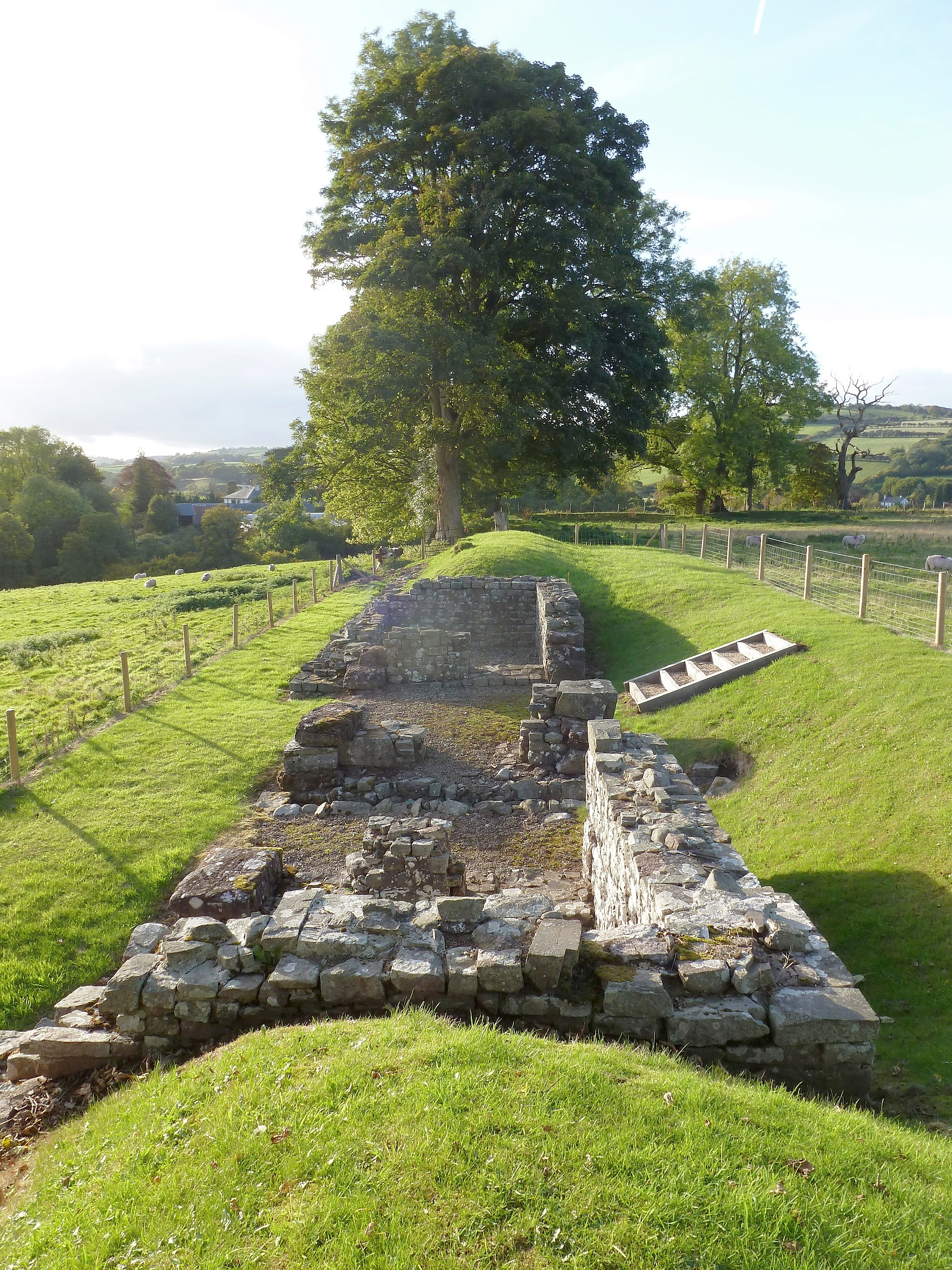
Foundations of the South gate

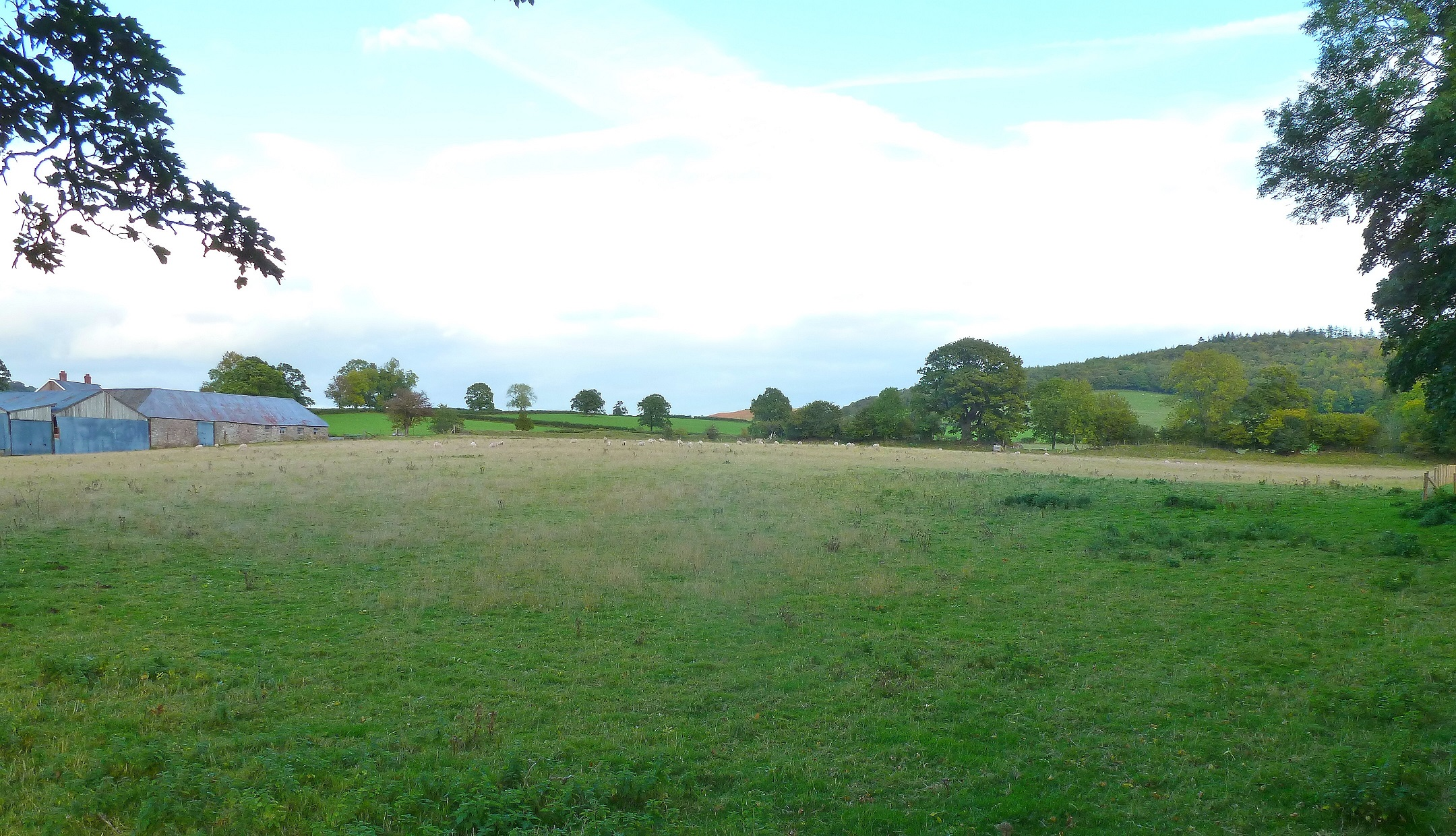
The site, looking NE from the former location of the SW corner turret

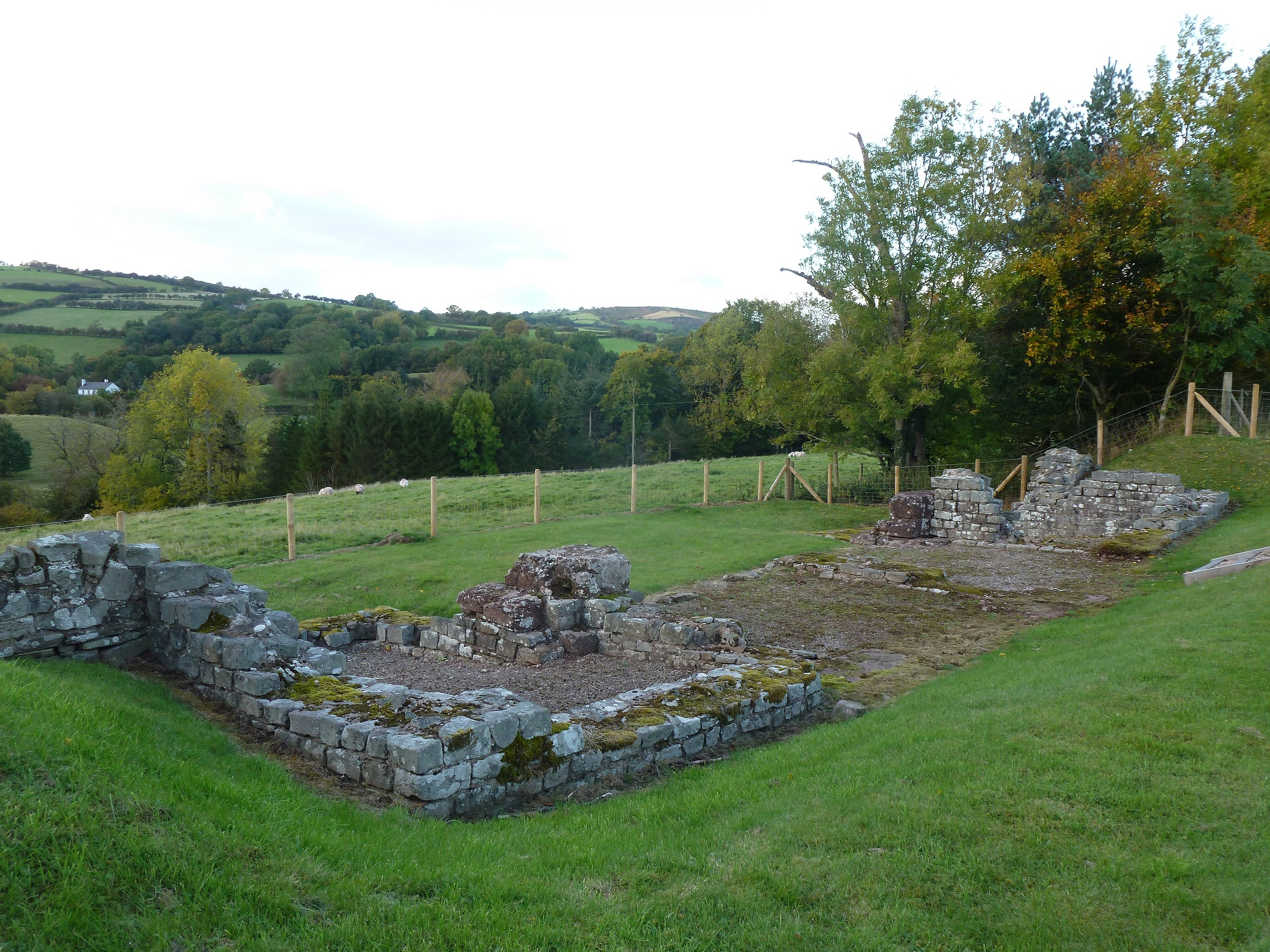
Foundations of the West gate

== See also ==
- List of Cadw properties
