= Hope Construction Materials =

UK company

- Company type: Limited company
- Industry: Construction materials
- Founded: 7 January 2013
- Defunct: 1 August 2016
- Fate: Acquired by Breedon Group
- Headquarters: Pindale Road; Hope; Derbyshire
- Area served: Britain
- Key people: Amit Bhatia, Chairman; Chris Plant, CEO
- Products: Aggregates, Cement, Concrete
- Number of employees: 250
- Website: www.breedoncement.com

Hope Construction Materials was a producer of cement, concrete and aggregates in the United Kingdom, founded on 7 January 2013 by entrepreneur Amit Bhatia. Before 1 April 2014, Hope Construction Materials was the trading name for the two entities, Hope Cement Limited and Hope Ready Mix Concrete Limited. It was acquired by Breedon Aggregates in August 2016. Assets included Hope Cement Works, the largest cement plant in the United Kingdom at Hope, Derbyshire, and a network of 170 ready-mix concrete plants, as well as aggregate extraction and logistics operations.

== History ==
In February 2011, cement company Lafarge and mining company Anglo American agreed to merge their British construction materials businesses. Due to the size of the venture, the Office of Fair Trading referred it to the UK's Competition Commission, who concluded in May 2012 that, because of the potential loss of competition in the aggregates, asphalt, cement and ready-mix concrete markets, some of their assets should be sold.

In November 2012, Lafarge and Anglo American agreed to sell ~£200 million worth of British assets to Amit Bhatia. The deal was completed in January 2013 with the creation of Hope Construction Materials.

The two firms, Hope Cement Limited, and Hope Ready Mixed Concrete Limited, traded under the name Hope Construction Materials, and were merged under that name in April 2014.

On 18 November 2015, Breedon Aggregates announced the acquisition of Hope Construction Materials for £336 million, and completed the deal on 1 August 2016.

== Operations ==
When the two Hope legal entities merged in 2014, the combined assets included a cement works at Hope, Derbyshire, which is the largest in the United Kingdom. The company also operated 170 ready-mix concrete plants; and a number of aggregate operations including quarries, rail terminals and shipping wharves. The company employed eight hundred people in January 2013.

Production at Hope Cement works in its first year of trading (to 2014) was over 1.3 million tonnes of cement per year.

== Railway ==
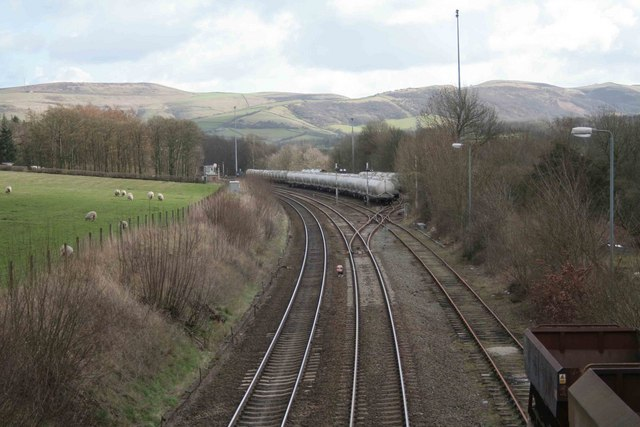
Earle's Sidings at Hope

When G & T Earle opened Earles Cement works in 1929, it was linked to the Hope Valley Line by a 2 mi (3.2 km) single track railway, which was worked by steam until 1963. Most of the cement now travels over it in trains hauled by class 20 locomotives to Earle's Sidings, where it is taken over by Freightliner.
