= Bradwell, Derbyshire =

Village in Derbyshire, England

Coordinates: 53°19′38″N 1°44′27″W

Bradwell
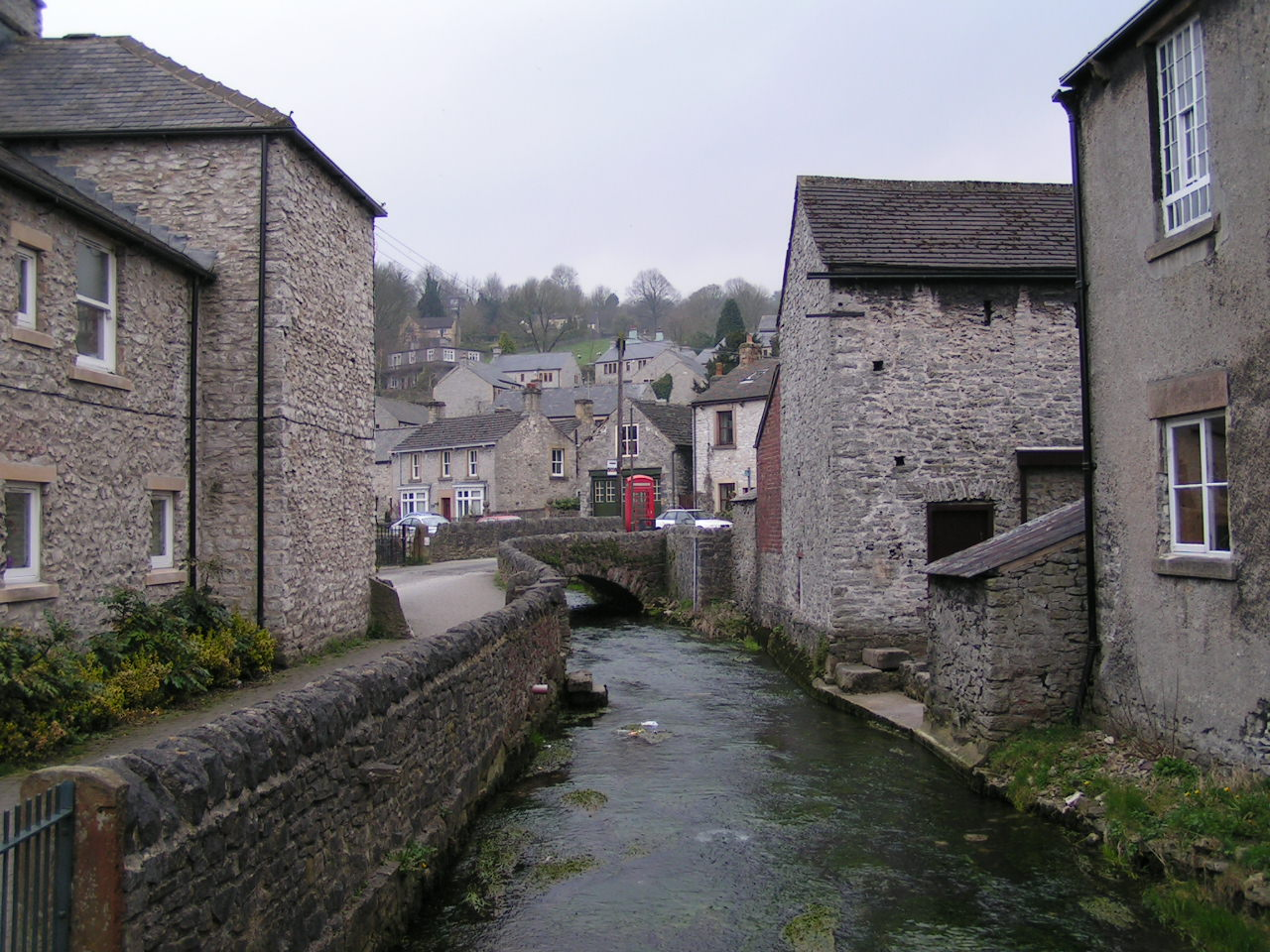
- Bradwell Brook

- Location within Derbyshire
- Population: 1,416 (2011)
- District: Derbyshire Dales
- Shire county: Derbyshire
- Region: East Midlands
- Country: England
- Sovereign state: United Kingdom
- Post town: HOPE VALLEY
- Postcode district: S33
- Dialling code: 01433
- Police: Derbyshire
- Fire: Derbyshire
- Ambulance: East Midlands
- UK Parliament: Derbyshire Dales

Bradwell is a village and civil parish in the Derbyshire Peak District of England. The population in 2022 was 1,787. It lies south of the main body of the Hope Valley but is usually included among its settlements.

== Toponymy ==
The name Bradwell is thought to be a corruption of Broadwell, a reference to the Grey Ditch. Some locals cite an alternative derivation from a well at the village's centre known as Brad's Well. It is unclear whether the village's name came from the well or vice versa.

== History ==
=== Pre-history ===
A Mesolithic pebble mace-head was found in Smalldale and a Mesolithic lithic working site was discovered when a site near Bradwell Moor Barn was excavated.

A number of Neolithic axes have been found in the village.

A Bronze Age barrow and the remains of a cist with a skeleton was found in 1891. A possible Bronze Age round barrow 19 m in diameter has been found near to Mitchlow Lane. A Late Bronze Age socketed bronze axehead was found at a property in Hungry Lane in 1940. It is now held by Buxton Museum.

=== Roman period ===
A few Roman remains have been found in the village, associated with the nearby Navio fort near Brough-on-Noe, including a Roman bath. Coins from the reign of Vespasian and Constantine the Great have been discovered and a Roman pig of lead has also been found in the village. The Roman road Batham Gate runs through the village.

=== Anglo-Saxon period ===
Grey Ditch is a medieval earthwork and a Scheduled Monument. Ceramic finds and the fact that the feature overlays the Roman road Batham Gate indicate that Grey Ditch is post-Roman. No firm date has been established for the earthwork with speculation that the feature might have been designed to halt the advance of the Angels or Anglo-Saxons in the 5th to 7th centuries. Other suggestions are the Grey Ditch might have formed the boundary between the Kingdoms of Northumbria and Mercia during the Heptarchy or that it was constructed in the Viking period.

=== Medieval period ===
The Domesday Book records that in 1066 Bradwell was held by Leofing, Owine of Bradwell and Sprot of Bradwell. By 1086 William Peverel is listed as both Lord and Tenant-in-chief. The population in 1086 was 8 villagers.

Hazlebadge Hall, dating from 1549, is a Grade II* listed building immediately south of the village in the adjacent parish of Hazlebadge.

=== 17th century to present ===
The oldest surviving public house in Bradwell is the White Hart. It was constructed in 1676.

Non-conformism was popular in Bradwell. In 1747 John Wesley preached in Towngate. In 1754 a Presbyterian chapel was built in the village. This became Unitarian at the end of the 18th century and is now used as a local scout headquarters. A General Baptist chapel opened in 1790. This was used by Primitive Methodists as a Sunday school in the 20th century. A Wesleyan Methodist chapel opened in 1807. It was restored and extended 1891. It is now a Methodist church. A Primitive Methodist chapel was constructed in 1845, extended in 1878, and closed in 1972.

Historically Bradwell was part of Hope ecclesiastical parish until 1868 when the Anglican Church of St. Barnabas opened. Samuel Fox, inventor of the Paragon umbrella frame, donated £100 towards the cost of constructing the church.

The village grew again in the eighteenth century around lead mining.

== Economy ==
As with many Peak District villages, Bradwell has become a settlement for commuters and retirees. The other sources of income are the landmark local cement factory in the adjacent parish of Hope, pubs, B&Bs, an eponymous locally made ice cream, and some subsidised farming. The Bagshaw Cavern former show cave is now only open by appointment. In November 2017 plans to build 43 three to five-bedroomed houses for the open market and 12 two-bedroomed affordable homes to meet local needs as well as six small industrial units on a former industrial estate were announced. As of 2025, these houses have been constructed and are in use, resulting in the increase in Bradwell's population.

== Culture and community ==
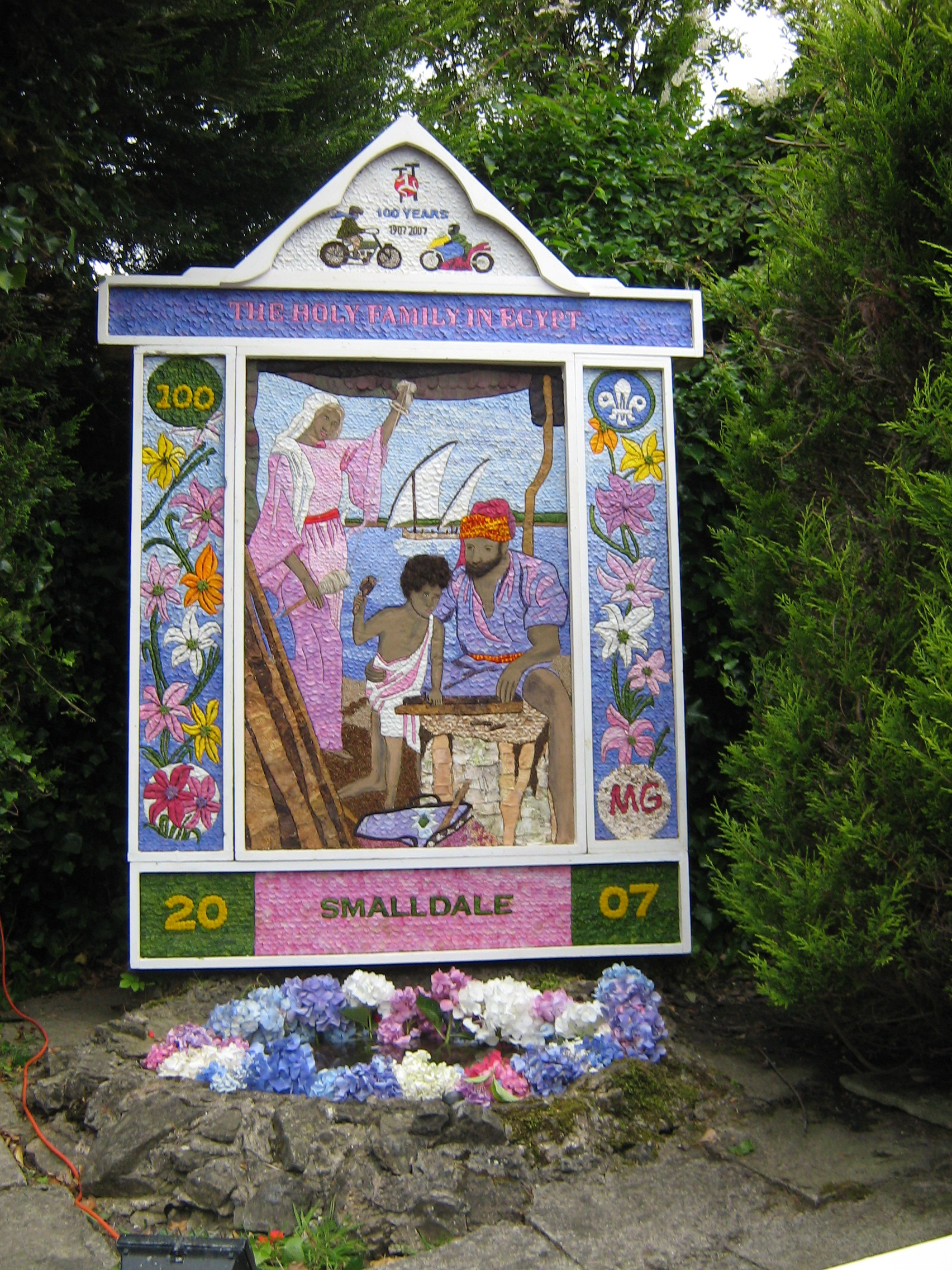
Smalldale Well

The village is known for its well dressing and holds a carnival each year, usually in August.

Bradwell has a number of green spaces including Beggars Plot Playing Field, Town Bottom Playing Field and the Rose Garden.

Bradwell Surgery is open weekdays with another surgery at nearby Tideswell.

== Transport ==
The B6049 Bradwell to Tideswell road runs through the village. It connects with the A6187 and the A623.

The village has four bus stops: Batham Gate (the northernmost), Memorial Hall, Town Gate, and Church. It is served by three bus routes:

- The 271/272 bus service runs between Castleton and Sheffield, departing approximately every hour from each terminus. However, due to Bradwell's position on the route, the service only stops in Bradwell at most every two hours in either direction from Memorial Hall. The 271/272 is operated by a combination of First and High Peak.
- The 173 bus service runs between Bakewell and Castleton, departing every two hours from 12pm in both directions from Memorial Hall. It is operated by Andrew's of Tideswell
- The 257b bus service runs between Bakewell and Sheffield, departing only twice a day toward Bakewell, and thrice a day toward Sheffield. It is operated by Andrew's of Tideswell.

The nearest railway station is at Hope on the Sheffield to Manchester (Hope Valley Line) with services provided by both Northern and East Midlands Railway.

== Education ==
Bradwell has both an Infant and Junior school, Bradwell CE Infant School and Bradwell Junior School. Hope Valley College was initially supposed to be built in Bradwell but due to a last minute issue an alteration was made to the plans and it was instead built in the neighbouring village of Hope.

== Sport ==
Bradwell Sports Club offers facilities for football, tennis and multi sports. The club was founded in 1947.

== Notable residents ==
- Denis Avey, British hero of the Holocaust.
- Samuel Fox, umbrella frame designer, was born here in 1815.

== Climate ==
Climate in this area has mild differences between highs and lows, and there is adequate rainfall year-round. The Köppen Climate Classification subtype for this climate is "Cfb". (Marine West Coast Climate/Oceanic climate).

== See also ==
- Listed buildings in Bradwell, Derbyshire
