= Blue Circle Industries =

British public company

- Industry: Building materials
- Predecessor: 24 firms Merged to form; Associated Portland Cement Manufacturers Ltd.
- Founded: 1900; 126 years ago
- Defunct: 2001; 25 years ago
- Fate: Acquired by Lafarge
- Headquarters: Thames and Medway estuaries, UK
- Products: Cement

Blue Circle Industries was a British public company manufacturing cement. It was listed on the London Stock Exchange, and a long time constituent of the FTSE 100 Index.

Blue Circle Industries was founded in 1900 as the Associated Portland Cement Manufacturers Ltd. through the amalgamation of 24 cement works, located mostly around on the Thames and Medway estuaries, together having around a 70 percent market share of the British cement market. In 1911, the British Portland Cement Manufacturers Ltd. was formed by the addition of a further 35 companies, creating a company with an initial 80 percent of the British cement market. Subsequently, the company expanded overseas, predominantly into Commonwealth countries and South and Central America. During 1953, the company was floated on the London Stock Exchange.

During the 1970s, Blue Circle was briefly the largest cement manufacturer in the world. However, the energy crisis of the 1970s compelled the company to contract, largely via the sale of several overseas plants. In 1978, the company's name was changed to Blue Circle, although it had long been informally referred to as such. In early 2001, following a protracted hostile bid to take over the firm, Blue Circle was acquired by French competitor Lafarge, which became the world's largest cement manufacturer.

== History ==
=== Background ===
The company was founded in 1900 as Associated Portland Cement Manufacturers Ltd by the amalgamation of 24 cement companies, owning 35 cement plants, all but two of which were on the Thames and Medway estuaries near London. These included the two cement plants (Robin's and Swanscombe) that first manufactured Portland cement in the 1840s. The initial prospectus of the merger (in a time before anti-trust laws) was to unify the entire British cement industry, eliminating competition, and excluding imports. The merger plan failed because a number of small companies – many of them outside the London area – refused to discuss the proposition, four major players in the initial discussions dropped out, and a further three committed companies dropped out at the last minute. Nonetheless, the company held 70 percent of the British cement manufacturing capacity (1.25 million tons per annum out of a total 1.8 million tons).

Furthermore, the company had acquired, at considerable cost, patents related to the use of rotary kilns (see cement kiln). However, the patents proved valueless, since rotary kilns were already in place or being installed by their competitors. In the ensuing decade, the majority of the rotary kilns installed in Britain were installed by the competition, including several newly launched companies. Because of the circumstances of the company's launch, it was short of cash and could ill afford investment. By 1910, its capacity remained 1.25 million tons per annum, although competing capacity had risen to 1.8 million tons. Although a few favoured plants had been modernized and updated, the majority of the original 35 plants had been shut down. In 1911, a second attempt was made to unify the industry: 33 companies, including all the original drop-outs, were merged to form the British Portland Cement Manufacturers Ltd. This time, a substantial number of plants outside the London area were involved. Again, a small but significant number of companies refused to join. The combined APCM and BPCM companies now controlled 80 percent of national capacity across 58 plants. This pattern became a template for subsequent history: declining capacity share was periodically boosted by acquisition of competitors, and the company continued to maintain 60–70 percent of British capacity until its demise.

=== Overseas expansion ===
Blue Circle's overseas activities began in 1912. The Tolteca plant near Mexico City had been established by the American Louisville Cement Company. The Americans, rattled by Mexican political instability in 1912, wanted to sell out. A Blue Circle director travelling in Mexico wrote them a cheque, and on returning to London, announced to the Board that they were now operating in Mexico. Similar deals were made for plants in Vancouver Island, Canada and the Orange Free State, South Africa in the same year. In later years, this wide geographical spread became a notable advantage for the company. The cement industry, although extremely capital-intensive, is subject to exaggerated economic cycles. Geographical spread allowed financing of investment in areas experiencing down-turns using revenue from more buoyant areas. At various times, the company owned or part-owned manufacturing capacity in Australia, New Zealand, Malaysia, Indonesia, the Philippines, India, Nigeria, Zimbabwe, Kenya, Tanzania, Egypt, Ireland, Spain, Denmark, Greece, United States, Chile and Brazil.

The company gradually built up a competence in the technical aspects of low-cost cement manufacture, and installed many new plants between 1950 and 1970 to its own specifications. It also sold manufacturing and plant-installation turnkey consultancy.

During 1953, the company was floated on the London Stock Exchange, and was one of the original members of the FT 30 stock market index.

As early as the 1920s, the company's main brand name – Blue Circle – had been informally used to refer to the company itself. However, it was not until 1978 that the company name was officially changed from APCM Ltd to Blue Circle Industries plc. It was during this same decade that Blue Circle became, briefly, the largest cement manufacturer in the world.

The company faltered following the 1970s energy crisis. The company's UK capacity reached its peak of 13 million tonnes per annum in 1973, and ultimately fell to half that level. Simultaneous worldwide contraction of markets led to severe retrenchment. In the 1980s, major overseas investments were sold, notably the by-then large Mexican operation. The Mexican plants became incorporated into the Cemex group, which by 2006 became the world's third largest cement manufacturer. This was followed by several failed attempts at diversification, which also failed to enhance investor confidence. In the late 1990s, the company again attempted to expand its cement operations geographically, this time facing intense competition from other large companies.

=== Fate ===
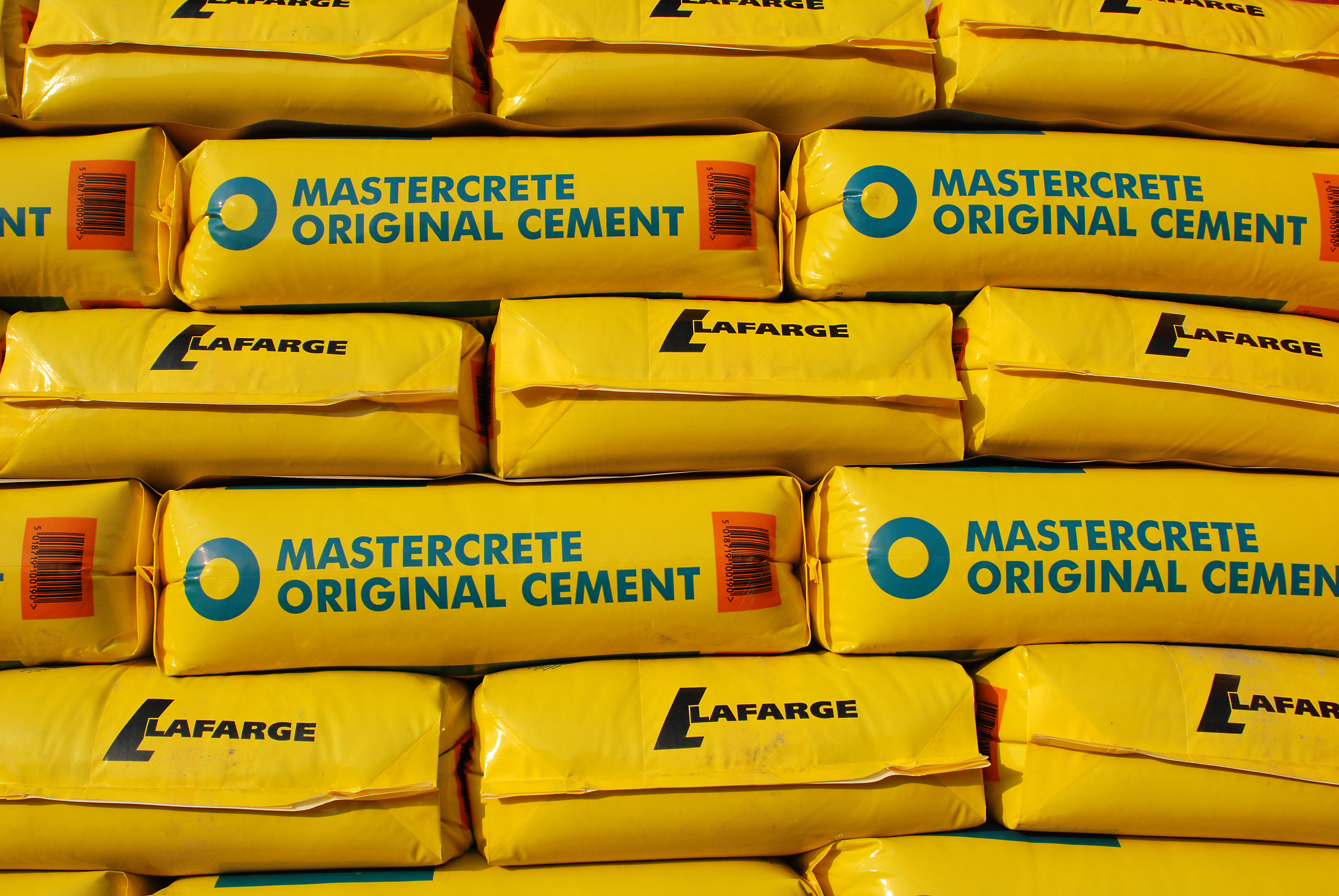
25 kg bags of Blue Circle/Lafarge cement

During the early 2000s, the ownership of the company was contested between several parties. In February 2000, the board of Blue Circle rejected a hostile bid by the French company Lafarge to purchase the company, which had valued the firm at £3.4 billion, and chose to enact measures aimed at warding off such a takeover, which included the sale of its bathroom fixtures and heating appliances interests along with the return of £800 million in capital to the firm's shareholders. In April 2000, despite the raising of additional complication in the form of Canadian regulatory concerns over Lafarge's envisioned takeover, it proceeded to purchase a 20 percent stake in Blue Circle, By July 2000, Lafarge's bid was being reported as having failed.

In January 2001, it was announced that the company, which had shrunk to the sixth largest producer worldwide, had finally been acquired by Lafarge. As a result of this transaction, Lafarge became the world's largest cement manufacturer. Lafarge continued to use "Blue Circle" as its cement brand name in the UK.

An agreement in 2012 between Lafarge and Anglo American proposed the creation of a joint venture to be known as Lafarge Tarmac. The Office of Fair Trading referred the deal to the Competition Commission, which instructed the two companies to sell off the Hope works in Derbyshire along with over half of their proposed joint UK ready-mix concrete capacity, together with sundry other facilities including asphalt plants, as a condition of approval for the joint venture. This led to the creation of Hope Construction Materials, which commenced operations in 2013 as Britain's leading independent producer of cement, ready-mix and aggregates, following acquisition of over 170 operational sites, including the former Blue Circle Hope cement works. In 2016, the Breedon Group purchased Hope Construction Materials for £336 million.

In 2015, following the merger of Lafarge and Holcim, as part of another complex deal to appease European competition regulators, the Irish building materials company CRH plc took control of a number of former LarargeHolcim assets, including the Tarmac and Blue Circle brands, together with the former Blue Circle works locations of Aberthaw, Barnstone, Dunbar, Northfleet and Westbury. The Holcim Group retained control of the two remaining former Blue Circle UK cement works, Cauldon and Cookstown, as part of Aggregate Industries, using the "Lafarge Cement" brand.

== UK competitors ==
- Buxton Lime Industries
- Rugby Cement – now owned by Cemex

== UK cement plants ==
The following British cement plants are among those which have been owned by Blue Circle:

- Aberthaw Works – East Aberthaw, Barry, Wales
- Barnstone Works – Langar, Nottinghamshire (kilns closed)
- Cauldon Works – Waterhouses, Staffordshire
- Cookstown Works – Cookstown, County Tyrone
- Dunbar Works – East Lothian, Scotland – the only cement factory in Scotland
- Dunstable Works – Houghton Regis, Bedfordshire (1923–1976)
- Harbury Works – Bishop's Itchington, Warwickshire
- Holborough Works – Snodland, Kent
- Humber Works – Melton, East Riding of Yorkshire (closed 1981)
- Hope Works – Hope, Derbyshire
- Magheramorne Works – Magheramorne, County Antrim (closed 1980, partly demolished)
- Martin Earles Works – Medway, Kent
- Masons Works – Claydon, Suffolk
- Norman Works – Cherry Hinton, Cambridgeshire (closed 1984)
- Northfleet Works – Northfleet, Kent (commissioned in 1970; partially demolished in 2010, with full demolition completed in 2022)
- Oxford Works – Shipton-on-Cherwell, Kidlington, Oxfordshire (closed 1986, partly demolished/abandoned)
- Penarth Works – Penarth, Glamorgan (closed 1969, completely demolished)
- Plymstock Works – Plymstock, Devon
- Shoreham Works – Shoreham-by-Sea, West Sussex (ceased operations 1991)
- Swanscombe Works – Swanscombe, Kent (commissioned in 1825, ceased operations in 1990, and demolished in 1993)
- Weardale Works – Eastgate, Weardale, County Durham (closed 2003, demolished 2005)
- Westbury Works – Westbury, Wiltshire (demolished 2016)
- Wilmington Works – Wilmington, Kingston upon Hull (closed 1969)
