= APCM =

APCM may refer to:

- Adaptive PCM, a signal encoding.
- Associated Portland Cement Manufacturers known by its acronym APCM
- Blue Circle Industries, named APCM until 1978
- Annual Parochial Church Meeting - a yearly meeting required of churches within the Church of England
