= British Rail Class 20 =

Class of diesel-electric locomotives

English Electric Type 1; British Rail Class 20
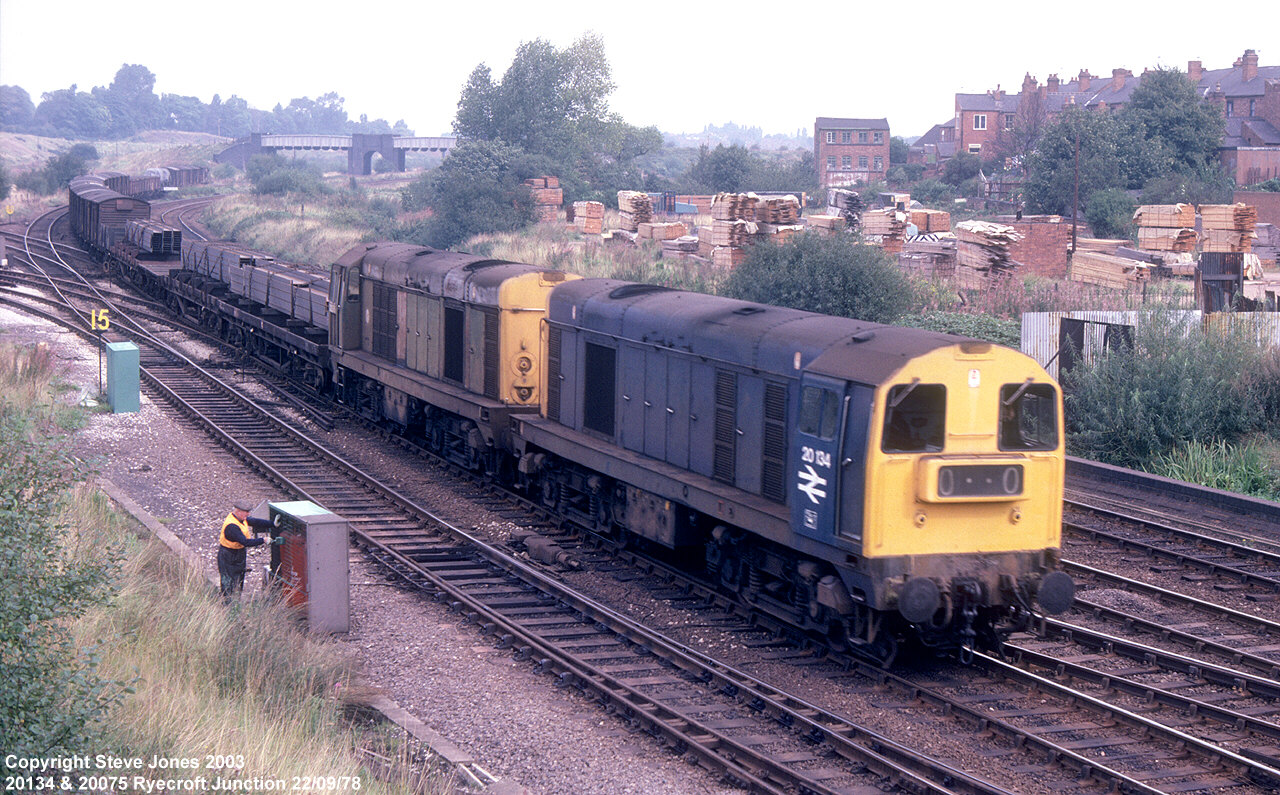
- 20134 & 20075 at Ryecroft Junction, 1978.
Type and origin
- Power type: Diesel-electric
- Builder: English Electric at Vulcan Foundry and Robert Stephenson and Hawthorns
- Build date: 1957–1962, 1965–1968
- Total produced: 228
Specifications
- Configuration
  - UIC: Bo′Bo′
  - Commonwealth: Bo-Bo
- Gauge: 4 ft 8 1/2 in (1,435 mm) standard gauge
- Wheel diameter: 3 ft 7 in (1.092 m)
- Minimum curve: 3.5 chains (70 m)
- Wheelbase: 32 ft 6 in (9.91 m)
- Pivot centres: 24 ft 0 in (7.32 m)
- Length: 46 ft 9 1/4 in (14.256 m)
- Width: 8 ft 9 in (2.67 m)
- Height: 12 ft 7 5/8 in (3.851 m)
- Loco weight: 73 t (72 long tons; 80 short tons)
- Fuel capacity: 380 imp gal (1,700 L; 460 US gal) (Note: 20084 fitted with additional tanks giving a total capacity of 1,040 gallons.)
- Lubricant cap.: 100 imp gal (450 L; 120 US gal)
- Coolant cap.: 130 imp gal (590 L; 160 US gal)
- Prime mover: English Electric 8 SVT Mk.II
- Generator: DC
- Traction motors: D8000–D8049: EE 526/5D; Remainder: EE 526/8D
- Cylinder size: 10 in × 12 in (250 mm × 300 mm)
- Transmission: Diesel electric
- Gear ratio: 63:17
- MU working: ★ Blue Star
- Train heating: None
- Train brakes: Vacuum, Dual or Air
Performance figures
- Maximum speed: 75 mph (121 km/h)
- Power output: Engine: 1,000 hp (746 kW)
- Tractive effort: Maximum: 42,000 lbf (186.8 kN); Continuous: 25,000 lbf (111.2 kN)@ 11 mph (17.7 km/h)
- Brakeforce: 35 long tons-force (349 kN)
Career
- Operators: British Railways; Railfreight; Eurostar; Direct Rail Services; HNRC; Balfour Beatty
- Numbers: D8000–D8199, D8300–D8327; later 20 001–20 228
- Nicknames: Chopper
- Axle load class: Route availability 5
- Withdrawn: 1976–present
- Disposition: 6 in service, 22 preserved, remainder scrapped or in storage.

The British Rail Class 20, otherwise known as an English Electric Type 1, is a class of diesel-electric locomotive. In total, 228 locomotives in the class were built by English Electric between 1957 and 1968, the large number being in part because of the failure of other early designs in the same power range to provide reliable locomotives.

The locomotives were originally numbered D8000–D8199 and D8300–D8327. They are known by railway enthusiasts as "Choppers".

== Overview ==
Designed around relatively basic technology, the 73-tonne locomotives produce 1,000 horsepower (750 kW) and can operate at up to 75 mph (121 km/h). Designed to work light mixed freight traffic, they have no train heating facilities. Locomotives up to D8127 were fitted with disc indicators in the style of the steam era; when headcodes were introduced in 1960 the locomotive's design was changed to incorporate headcode boxes. Although older locomotives were not retro-fitted with headcode boxes, a few of the earlier batch acquired headcode boxes as a result of repairs. Unusually for British designs, the locomotive had a single cab. This caused serious problems with visibility when travelling nose first, though in these circumstances the driver's view is comparable to that on the steam locomotives that the Class 20s replaced. It was common, however, to find Class 20s paired together at the nose, with their cabs at opposite ends, ensuring that the driver could quite clearly see the road ahead, and a guard can watch the train from the other locomotive without the need for a brakevan.

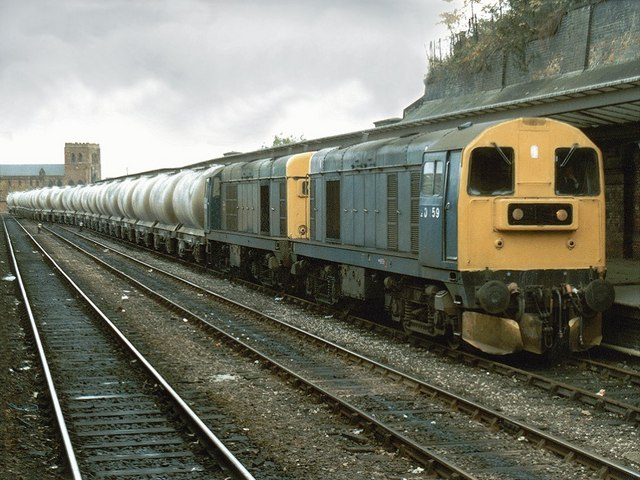
Two Class 20s, coupled nose to nose, hauling a freight train in 1986

The Class 20 saw only limited service on passenger trains. A small number were fitted with a through pipe for steam heating, primarily for use in conjunction with a Class 27 locomotive on the West Highland Line. Otherwise their use was limited to summer relief services, particularly to Skegness often under the adopted title of The Jolly Fisherman starting from various places including Burton-on-Trent, Stoke-on-Trent, Derby and Leicester. Also occasionally other holiday resorts on the east coast of England, occasional duties as a pilot, and short distance diversions of electric-hauled trains over non-electrified lines.

The shift of light mixed freight to the road network left British Rail with an oversupply of small locomotives. The Class 20s, however, could work in multiple and so could handle heavier traffic. Most spent the majority of their working lives coupled nose to nose in pairs to provide a more useful 2,000 hp (1,500 kW) unit and to solve the visibility problems.

As of 2024, most have now been withdrawn, but a small number remain in consistent mainline service with Balfour Beatty in addition to other charter operators including LSL TOC. Industrial use of the Class 20 continues at Hope Cement Works with locomotives supplied by Swietelsky (formerly Harry Needle Railroad Company). Several that are usually operated singly have been fitted with nose-mounted video cameras as a way of solving the visibility problems.

The Série 1400 locomotives of Portuguese Railways (CP) and the G class locomotives of Midland Railway of Western Australia are based on the BR Class 20s, with the latter units featuring a different cab, based on the Jamaican Railways Class 81.

== Operation ==
=== British Rail ===
Distribution of locomotives, March 1974
British Rail Class 20 is located in England
Code	Name	Quantity
ED	Eastfield	49
HA	Haymarket	19
IM	Immingham	7
TI	Tinsley	44
TO	Toton	109
Total:		228

In June 1957, D8000 was delivered to Devons Road depot in Bow, London. The rest of the first batch of Class 20s were delivered to Devons Road over the following nine months, to work cross-London transfer freights. The following eight locos allocated to Hornsey depot. After a trial with D8006, D8028–D8034 were allocated for work in highland Scotland, and had tablet catcher recesses built into the cabsides. D8035–D8044 were originally to be allocated to Norwich, but were actually used for empty coaching stock (ECS) workings in and out of London Euston. D8050–D8069 were allocated to the new Tinsley TMD in South Yorkshire, from where they regularly worked into Lincolnshire and East Yorkshire. D8070–D8127 were sent to operate in the Scottish Lowlands, particularly in the Forth-Clyde area, and the Fife coalfield. This completed the original orders for 128 locos, the last being delivered in August 1962.

With the subsequent order for a further 100 Class 20 locos, deliveries recommenced with D8128 in January 1966. Tests in 1967 using D8179 and D8317 resulted in locos from D8316 being delivered from the manufacturer with the new electronic control system for working merry-go-round (MGR) coal trains. Certain trains to Longannet Power Station operated with three locomotives, two at one end and one at the other. These trains were made up with 42 HAA wagons and the formation avoided the need for running round.

=== After privatisation ===
Some Class 20s were used on the construction of the Channel Tunnel and High Speed 1 and some even made their way to France to work for the Compagnie des chemins de Fer Départementaux (CFD) in industry there, although these have since been repatriated. Some locos have in the past been hired by Hunslet-Barclay to provide motive power for weedkilling trains.

The fleet of Class 20/3s owned by Direct Rail Services (DRS) did at times see frequent work across Britain in pairs (or with Class 37s) on nuclear flask trains, the company's speciality. DRS supplies class 20s for use with the Rail Head Treatment Train in winter. Perhaps the most unusual train hauled by a Class 20 was the Kosovo Train for Life charter train in autumn 1999 which carried 800 tonnes of aid. Leaving London's Kensington Olympia station on 17 September 1999, the train was hauled by 20 901, 20 902 and 20 903 throughout, reaching Prague by 20 September and arriving at Pristina station at 10:00 on 25 September.

DRS initially had a fleet of 15 operational Class 20/3 locomotives. Three of these have subsequently been disposed of for scrap, after stripping for spares; a further two were sold on to Harry Needle Railroad Company (HNRC, now Swietelsky). Following the end of the 2019 Sandite season (Rail Head Treatment Trains), all of the remaining DRS Class 20/3 fleet were stood down, awaiting disposal.

In 2005 HNRC acquired a large number of 20/0s and 20/9s from the stored DRS fleet. By May 2008 HNRC had eight operational Class 20s and sixteen in storage; two were on hire at Corus Scunthorpe (nos. 81 and 82).

Over a ten-year period, concluding in 2019, a number of Class 20s from HNRC were employed to deliver new S-Stock from Bombardier Transportation at Derby Litchurch Lane Works, to London Underground at Neasden depot or West Ruislip depot, for commissioning. Subsequently, immediately after the completion of deliveries, modification of these units (addition of equipment for automatic signalling) was required and they were returned to Derby in the same manner. Formation of the trains usually consisted of a pair of Class 20s, two barrier wagons, the LU S-Stock set, two barrier wagons and a dead-in-tow pair of Class 20s at the rear.

== Sub-classes ==
Sub-Class	Description
20/0	Standard as-built locos.
20/3 (BR)	A small fleet of standard Class 20/0s modified for Peak Forest aggregate workings.
20/3 (DRS)	DRS-owned/operated locos fitted with modified cab equipment and fully refurbished, with use of electronics and various other modifications. Two of these locomotives, 20 311 and 20 314, were subsequently sold to HNRC.
20/9	Modified from Class 20/0 after withdrawal and sold to Hunslet-Barclay for contract freight use and remote-control trialling. Few technical differences from standard locos. Subsequently, sold to DRS, and latterly to HNRC (of which 20 903 & 906 remain; 20 902 has been scrapped). In January 2024, Balfour Beatty purchased 20 901 and 20 905 from HNRC for use within Drain Train operations.

== Liveries ==
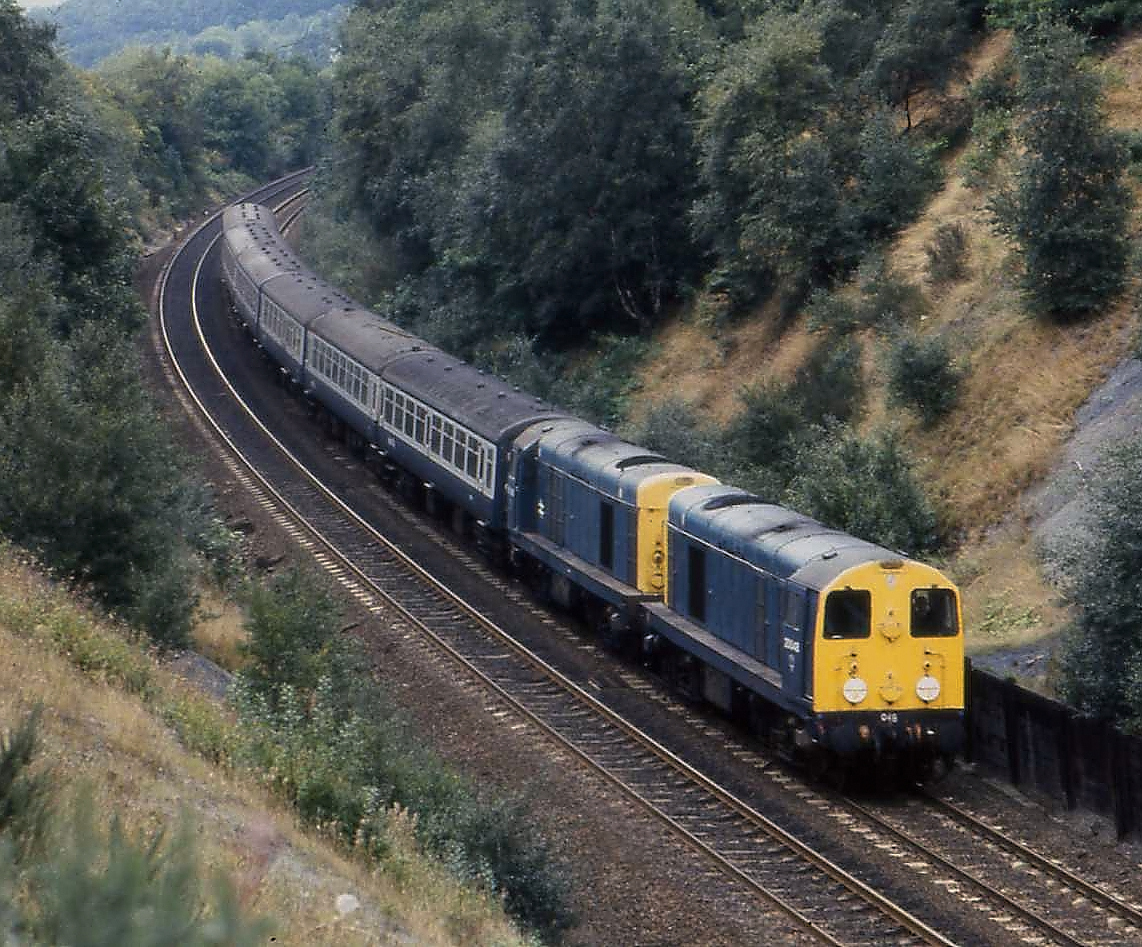
Two Class 20s working a passenger train

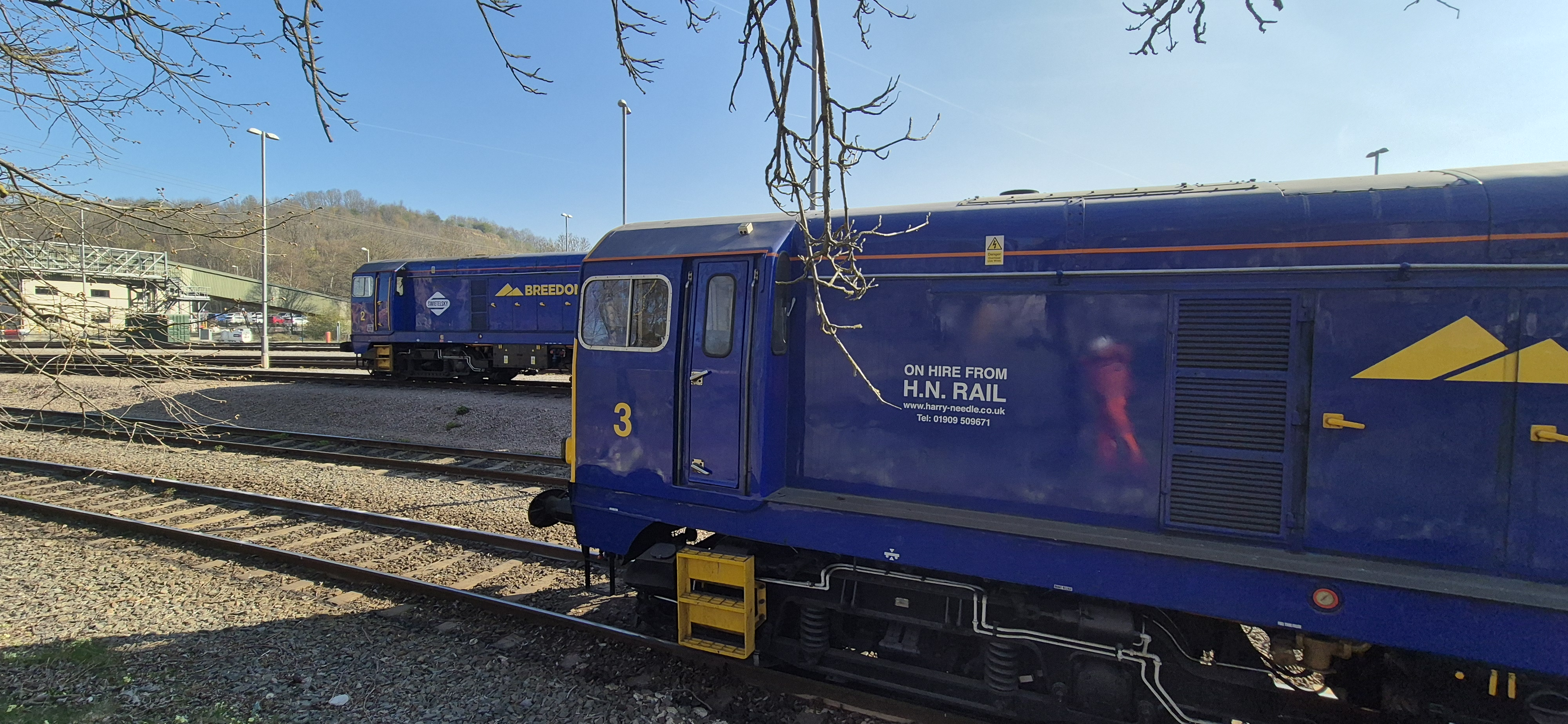
20 168 "Sir George Earle" and 20 906 at Hope Cement Works in 2025

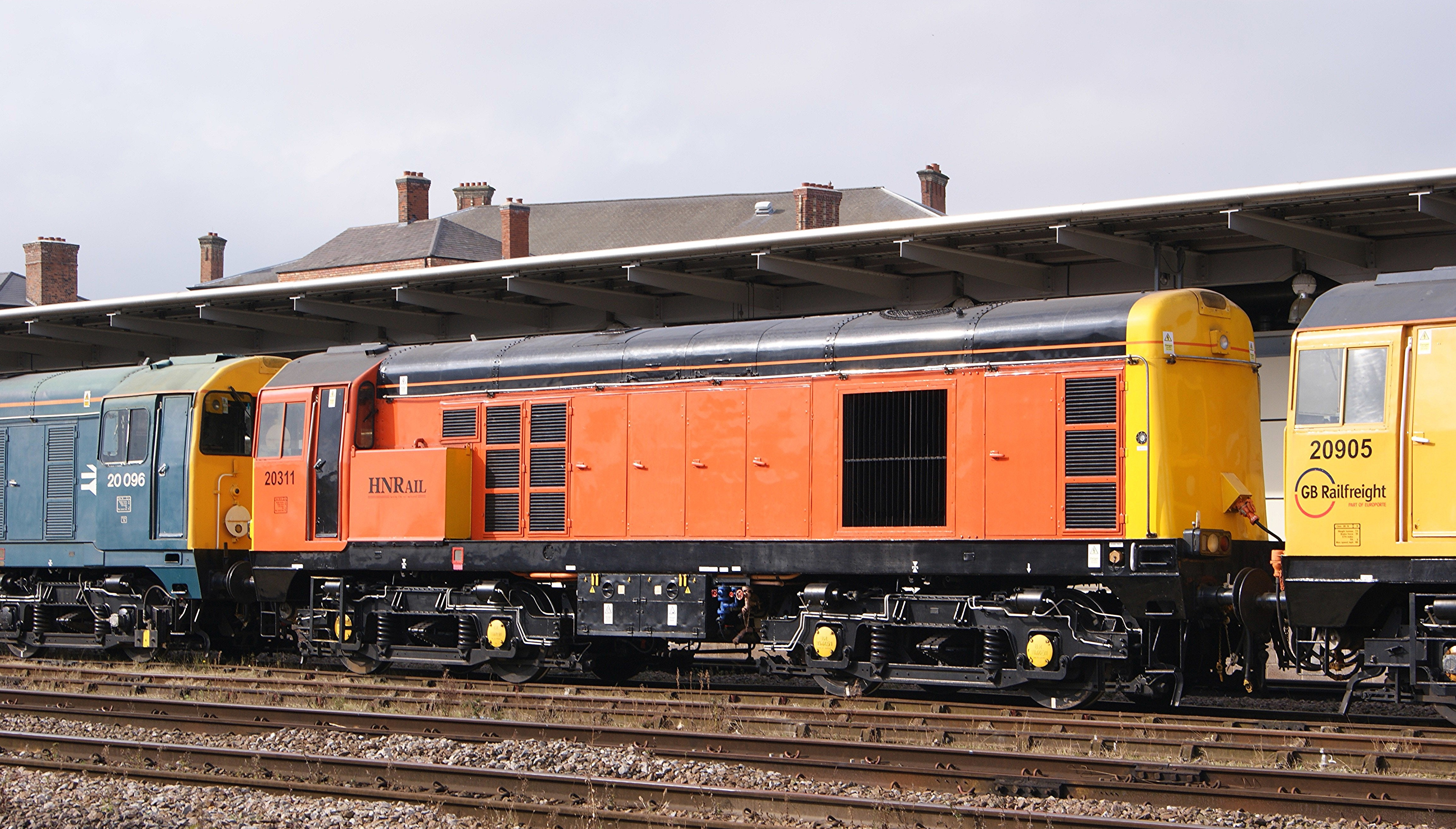
Harry Needle Railroad Company 20 311 at Derby in 2014

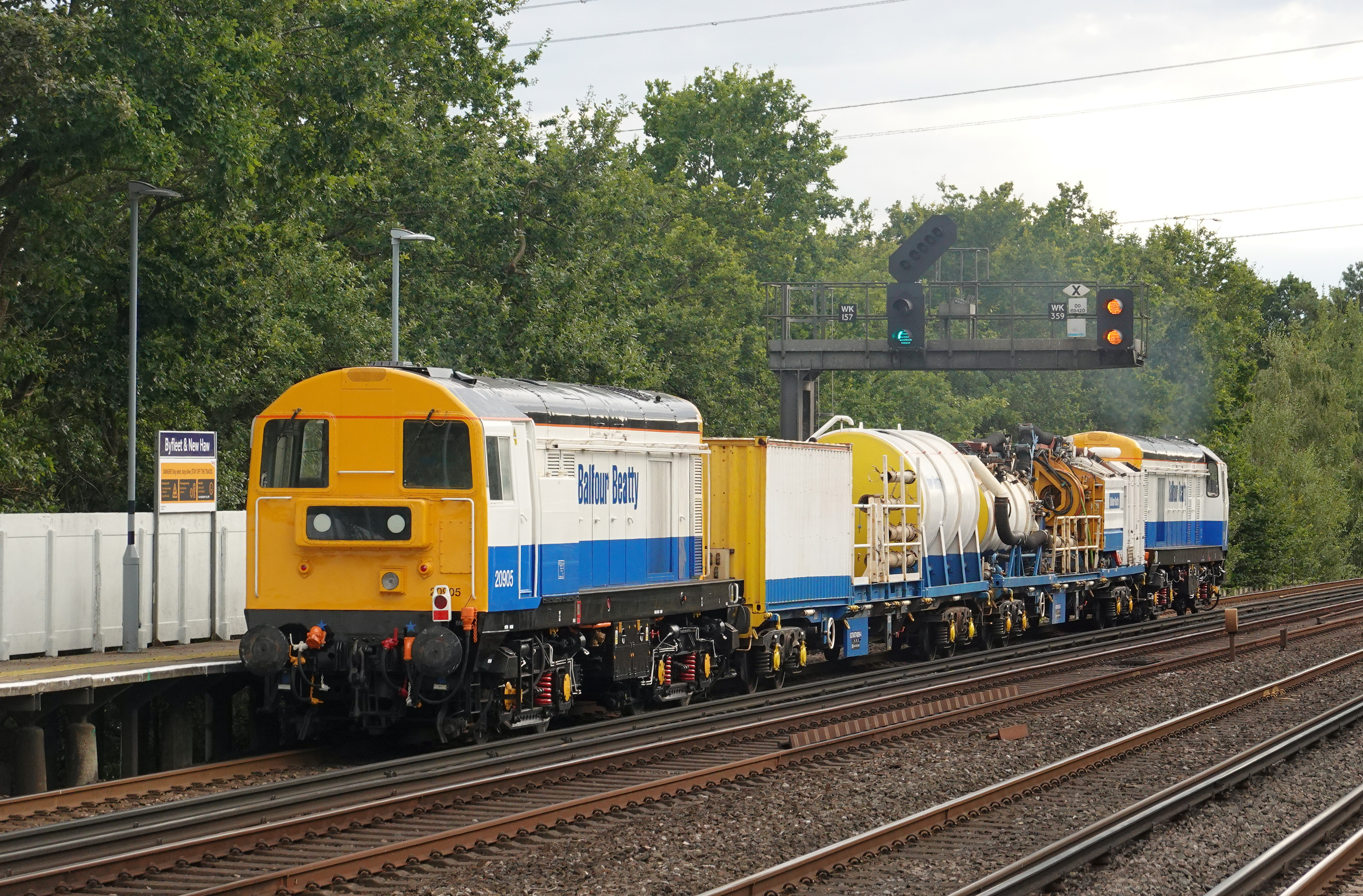
Balfour Beatty 20901 & 20905 with the Drain Train working 6J09 Crewe Gresty Lane Down Sidings to Woking Up Yard passes Byfleet & New Haw, 2024

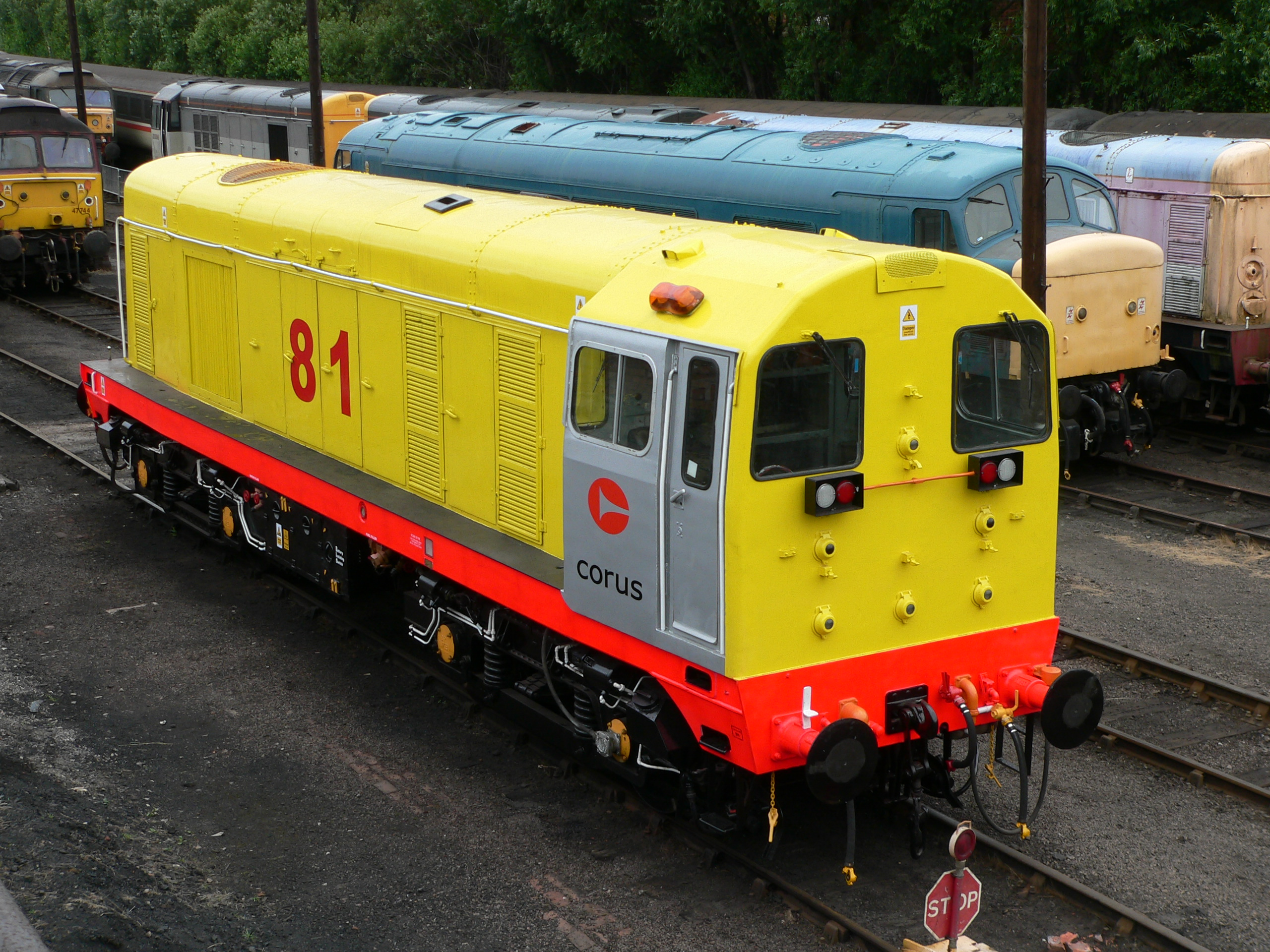
Corus 81 (ex-BR 20 056) at Barrow Hill Engine Shed, 2006

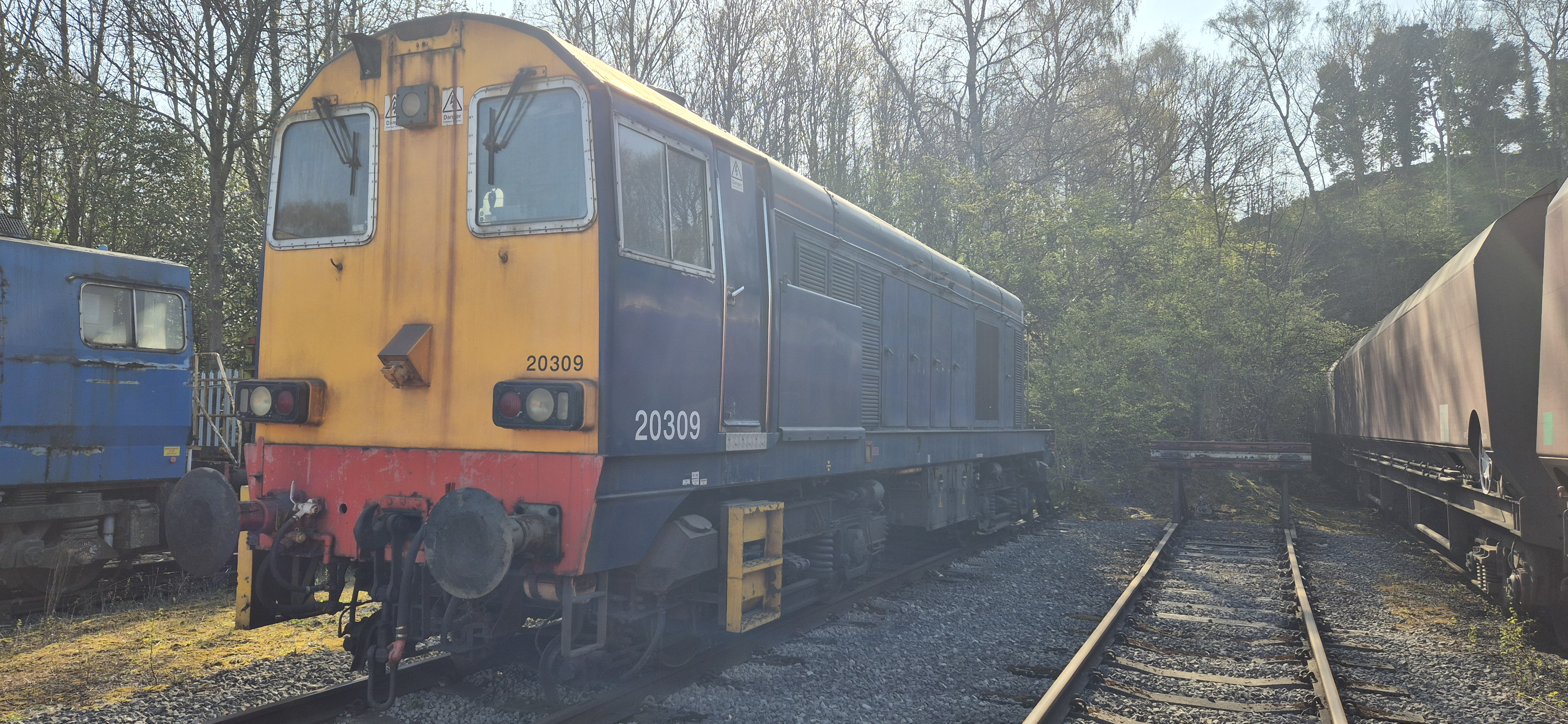
20 309 On hire from Swietelsky sat by the loco shed at Breedon's Hope Cement Works, 2025

=== British Rail ===
D8000 was delivered in June 1957 in overall green livery, with grey footplate, red bufferbeams and a grey roof extending down the bodyside to the edge of the roof panels. The original batch of 10 locos bore the BR crest facing towards the nose on both sides, used yellow sans serif numerals, and had green cab roofs; locos from D8010 had the correct pattern BR crest, white numerals and grey cab roof. This was adjusted after D8103 to include a small yellow warning panel, although the precise size and detail of such panels varied somewhat.

In 1966, D8048 was selected by the BR design panel for livery experiments and was painted in the prototype standard blue, including the bufferbeams and roof. The exceptions were the full yellow front ends and a black underframe. After the adoption of Rail Blue as the BR livery, D8178 became one of the first locomotives to be delivered in this livery (along with Class 25 D7660 and Class 47 D1953) and all subsequent locomotives were delivered in this livery. Despite this, some locos continued to be returned to traffic in green livery, although often with the later BR "double arrow" logo and data panel; thus 20 141 was the final main line loco to carry BR green livery.

Some locomotives, including 20 227, were repainted in the Railfreight grey livery with red sole bars, yellow ends and large double arrows on the sides.

At least four of the class were painted in the British Rail Telecommunications livery:

- 20 075 – Sir William Cooke – rebuilt as 20 309 and sold by DRS to HNRC, currently on short-term hire at Breedon's Hope Cement Works.
- 20 128 – Guglielmo Marconi – rebuilt as 20 307 and has been scrapped
- 20 131 – Almon B. Strowger – rebuilt as 20 306 and has been scrapped
- 20 187 – Sir Charles Wheatstone – rebuilt as 20 308 and currently stood down by DRS, awaiting disposal

=== Privatisation ===
Class 20/3 locomotives operated by DRS have all been painted in DRS Oxford Blue livery, with red bufferbeams and full yellow ends. There have been small variations in the shade of yellow used on these locos, and the penetration of blue from the sides onto the ends.

Class 20 locomotives operated by Swietelsky (who have recently acquired the Harry Needle Railroad Company (HNRC)) are painted in the HNRC house colours of orange and black, with yellow nose ends (20 121, 20 166, 20 311 and 20 314). Some other locomotives owned by HNRC, of subclasses 20/0 and 20/9, have been painted in a variation of two-tone Railfreight grey livery. These have dark grey roof, mid-grey upper body and light grey lower body, black underframe and buffer beam. The nose ends are painted yellow, with the lower part of the cab end in yellow and the upper part black, this continuing around the cab sides but with the light grey instead of yellow. Others are in BR Blue or Railfreight Red-stripe livery.

HNRC Class 20s on long-term hire to Corus were painted in Corus livery; previously silver but currently a bright yellow with red solebar (No.81 – 20 056). Since the Corus business was bought by the Indian Tata Steel group, some of these locomotives have been repainted into Tata Blue livery (No.82 – 20 066). Two HNRC Class 20s were painted into GBRf Europorte's blue and gold livery (20 901 and 20 905) prior to being sold to Balfour Beatty in 2024, while two other HNRC Class 20s have been painted in the blue livery of Breedon; No.2 – 20 168 "Sir George Earle" and No.3 – 20 906 and are on long-term hire at Hope Cement Works.

Two locomotives, numbers 20 142 and 20 189, were briefly (for a matter of months during 2013) painted into a Balfour Beatty blue and white livery but were then returned to a variation of BR blue shortly after. In January 2024, Balfour Beatty purchased 20 901 and 20 905, which were then repainted at Arriva TrainCare Bristol Barton Hill TMD into Balfour Beatty corporate blue and white livery. Both locomotives were fitted with diesel engine heaters to aid in starting from cold.

Four locomotives carried the orange and white livery of the CFD (Compagnie de Chemins de Fer Départementaux) whilst working in France, these were 20 035, 20 063, 20 139 and 20 228.

The last built Class 20, number 20 227, has been used extensively on the London Underground network. In the mid-2000s it was painted in Metropolitan maroon livery and named "Sir John Betjeman" by the Class 20 Locomotive Society as acknowledgement of this work. It was repainted in a special 'modern taste' LUL-based livery, to mark the London Underground 150 celebrations but has now been repainted, again into Metropolitan maroon, but this time lined, and renamed "Sherlock Holmes". The "Sir John Betjeman" name is now carried by 20 142, which also sports Metropolitan lined maroon livery.

Mainline registered class 20s are:

Sub-Class	Description
20/0	20 007, 20 096, 20 107, 20 118, 20 132, 20 142, 20 168, 20 189, 20 205, 20 227
20/3	20 301, 20 302, 20 303, 20 304, 20 305, 20 308, 20 309, 20 311, 20 312, 20 314
20/9	20 901, 20 905, 20 906

== Accidents and incidents ==
- On 16 December 1971, locomotives D8142 and D8115 collided with Class 25 no. D7605 at Lenton South Junction, Nottingham, killing 3 railwaymen.
- On 18 May 1989, locomotives 20 134 and 20 131 collided with the rear of an MGR train at Worksop, killing the driver.
- On 21 September 2021, 20 189 collided with a rake of carriages at Grosmont, North Yorkshire Moors Railway. Five passengers on the heritage railway service were injured.

== In popular culture ==
For the 1995 James Bond film GoldenEye, a Class 20 (20 188) on the Nene Valley Railway was made to look like a Russian armoured train with the addition of fake armour.

== Preservation ==
22 English-Electric Type 1 Class 20s are preserved, including the first of the class built, D8000, which is part of the National Railway Collection at the National Railway Museum in York, North Yorkshire.

Class 20s in preservation
TOPS number	Current number	Photo	Preserved by	Location
20 001	D8001		Class 20 Locomotive Society	Epping Ongar Railway
20 007	20 007		Class 20 189 Ltd	Mainline operational
20 020	20 020		Scottish Railway Preservation Society	Bo'ness and Kinneil Railway
20 031	20 031		Privately owned	Keighley & Worth Valley Railway
20 048	20 048		Class 20189 Ltd	Midland Railway, Butterley
20 050	D8000		National Collection	National Railway Museum
20 057	D8057		Privately Owned	Churnet Valley Railway
20 059	D8059		Somerset & Dorset Loco Company	Watercress Line
20 066	20 066		Privately Owned	Swanage Railway
20 069	D8069		Privately owned	-
20 098	D8098		Type One Locomotive Company	Great Central Railway, Loughborough
20 137	20137		Privately owned	Gloucestershire Warwickshire Railway
20 142 (Sir John Betjeman)	20 142		Class 20 189 Ltd	Mainline operational
20 154	D8154		English Electric Preservation	Great Central Railway (Nottingham)
20 166	20166		Privately owned	Caledonian Railway
20 188	D8188		Somerset & Dorset Loco Company	Watercress Line
20 189	20 189		Class 20 189 Ltd	Mainline operational
20 205	20 205		Class 20 Locomotive Society	Mainline operational
20 214	20 214		Privately owned	Lakeside and Haverthwaite Railway
20 227	20 227		Class 20 Locomotive Society	Mainline operational
20 228	2004		Privately owned	Gloucestershire Warwickshire Railway

A further three engines were preserved but later used for spares, then eventually scrapped. 20 035 was stripped of parts for use on fellow Gloucestershire Warwickshire Railway based classmate D8137, and later scrapped at EMR Kingsbury. 20 177 was located at the Severn Valley Railway and became a source of spare parts for D8188 & D8059; with the remains first going to C.F. Booth Ltd., Rotherham and then the cab section to The Cab Yard in south Wales. 20206 was operated on the Mid-Norfolk Railway, but later sold by its owner, stripped of parts and scrapped.

== Named locos ==
The following locos received names:

- 20075 Sir William Cooke
- 20128 Guglielmo Marconi
- 20122 Cleveland Potash
- 20131 Almon B. Strowger
- 20137 Murrary B Hofmeyr
- 20165 Henry Pease
- 20187 Sir Charles Wheatstone
- 20301 Max Joule
- 20310 Gresty Bridge
- 20311 Class 20 Fifty
- 20314 Saltburn by the Sea
- 20901 Nancy
- 20902 Lorna
- 20903 Alison
- 20904 Janis
- 20905 Iona
- 20906 Georgina Kilmarnock 400

== Model railways ==
Hornby Dublo released a BR green OO gauge version of the English Electric Type 1 in 1958, which was in production until 1962. After acquisition of the body moulds, G & R Wrenn re-released the model in 1978. In 2008 Hornby Railways launched its first version of the BR Class 20 in OO gauge.

Lima Model Railways also produced an OO gauge version from 1984 until 2002 in a wide variety of liveries.

In May 2021 Bachmann Collectors Club announced a limited edition run of two London Transport models of the class 20, No. 20142 Sir John Betjeman and No. 20227 Sherlock Holmes. The models are produced in conjunction with the London Transport Museum.

In 2010, Heljan produced an O gauge Class 20 in BR blue.

== General references ==
- Marsden, Colin J. (1981). Motive power recognition: 1 Locomotives. Shepperton: Ian Allan Ltd. ISBN 0-7110-1109-5.
- Marsden, Colin J.; Fenn, Graham B. (1988). British Rail Main Line Diesel Locomotives. Sparkford: Haynes. ISBN 9780860933182. OCLC 17916362.
