= Bradwell Brook =

Coordinates: 53°20′02″N 1°44′09″W

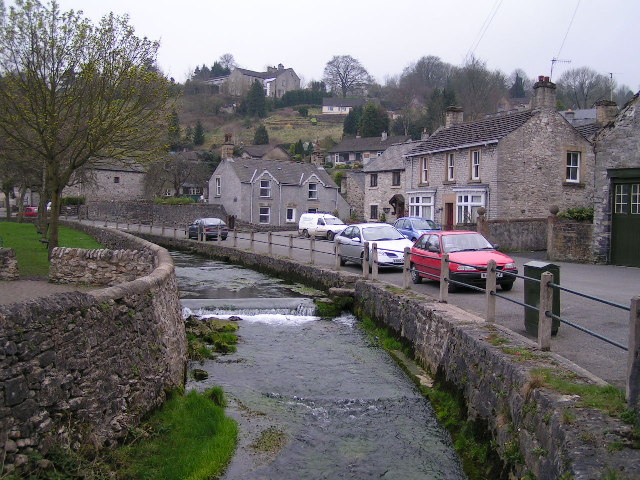
- The Bradwell Brook in Bradwell

Location
- Country: England

Physical characteristics
- Source
  - location: Bradwell
- Mouth
  - location: River Noe

Bradwell Brook is a stream in the Derbyshire Peak District, originating in Bradwell, in a cave known as Bagshawe Resurgence.

== Background ==
Bradwell Brook flows north through Bradwell, through Brough, before meeting the River Noe south of Aston in the Hope Valley. The Roman fort of Navio is at the confluence of Bradwell Brook and River Noe.

Because of its location in the valley, the brook is prone to flooding.

== See also ==
- List of rivers of England
