= St Barnabas' Church, Bradwell =

St Barnabas’ Church, Bradwell
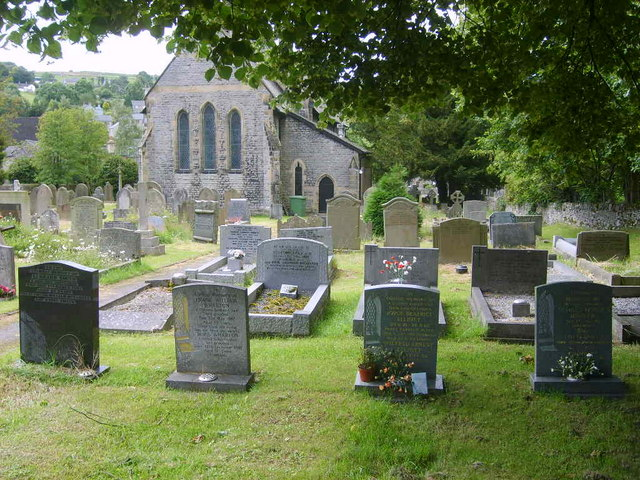
- St Barnabas’ Church, Bradwell
- St Barnabas’ Church, Bradwell
- 53°19′35″N 01°44′20″W
- Location: Bradwell, Derbyshire
- Country: England
- Denomination: Church of England

History
- Dedication: St Barnabas
- Consecrated: 22 October 1868

Architecture
- Heritage designation: Grade II listed
- Architect: C C Townsend
- Groundbreaking: 1867
- Completed: 1868

Specifications
- Length: 144 feet (44 m)
- Width: 45 feet (14 m)
- Height: 88 feet (27 m)

Administration
- Diocese: Diocese of Derby
- Archdeaconry: Chesterfield
- Deanery: Bakewell and Eyam
- Parish: Bradwell

St Barnabas' Church, Bradwell is a Grade II listed parish church in the Church of England in Bradwell, Derbyshire.

== History ==
The church was designed by the architect C C Townsend. Construction started in 1867 and the building was consecrated on 22 October 1868 by Bishop Trower. Samuel Fox, inventor of the Paragon umbrella frame, donated £100 towards the cost of constructing the church. The foundation for the tower was laid on Saturday 3 August 1888 and the contract awarded to Alfred Hill of Tideswell. The design of the tower was by Naylor and Tait of Derby. The tower and clock were completed and opened on 15 July 1889. The spire was completed in 1891.

== Parish status ==
The church is in a joint parish with

- St Edmund’s Church, Castleton
- St Peter's Church, Hope

== Organ ==
The church contains a pipe organ by Brindley and Foster. A specification of the organ can be found on the National Pipe Organ Register.

== See also ==
- Listed buildings in Bradwell, Derbyshire
- Denis Avey
