= Bradwell Methodist Church =

Methodist church in Derbyshire

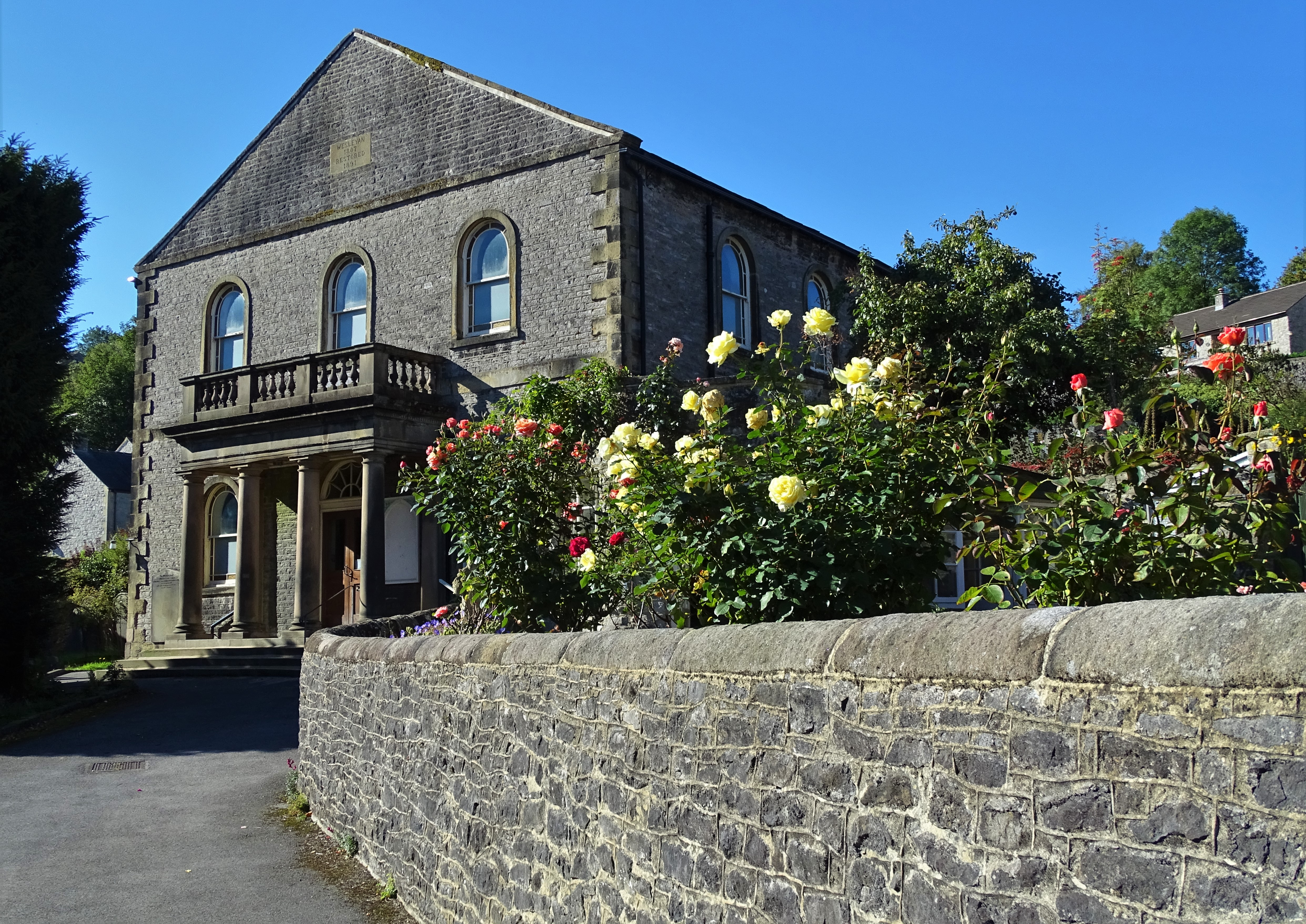
- Bradwell Methodist Church
- Bradwell Methodist Church
- 53°02′27.1″N 2°13′58.3″W
- OS grid reference: SK 17306 81102
- Location: Bradwell, Derbyshire
- Country: England
- Denomination: Methodism

Architecture
- Heritage designation: Grade II listed

Bradwell Methodist Church is a Grade II listed Methodist church in Bradwell, Derbyshire.

The building dates back to 1807, and became Grade II listed on 12 October 1984.

== See also ==
- Listed buildings in Bradwell
