= Hope Cement Works =

Cement plant in Derbyshire, England

- The Hope Cement Works

- Location within Derbyshire
- Built: 1929 (rebuilt in 1970)
- Location: Hope, Derbyshire, England
- Coordinates: 53.337°N 1.751°W
- Industry: Cement
- Products: Cement
- Owner: Breedon

Hope Cement Works is a cement plant located near to the village of Hope in Derbyshire, England. The plant is mostly self-contained with its own shale and limestone quarries adjacent, with only fuel and small amounts of additives needing to be brought in. The site is located inside the Peak District National Park, and so is subject to tighter planning restrictions than other cement plants in the United Kingdom. It is now the largest cement plant in the United Kingdom (in terms of tonnages of cement), and is also one of the largest emitters of CO_{2} within the national park.

== History ==
The plant started its first full year of production in 1929, and was initially producing 50,000 tonnes (55,000 tons) of cement per year. The plant was then expanded in 1935, 1948, 1961, and 1969. The plant was located at Hope, because it is at the edge of where carboniferous limestone of the Monsal Dale Group, meets shale (Edale Shale), the two main components of finished cement. The shale beds are to the north and east of the works, whereas the limestone is to the south. A geological survey conducted in 1927-1928 confirmed the suitability of the local limestone and shale deposits for cement production. A byproduct of the lime quarrying process is the mineral fluorspar, which is used as a chemical feedstock. Originally, the cement was made with a 'wet' process, which used two kilns, with two more added in the 1930s and a fifth in 1952. By the 1960s, an upgrade of the plant led to it being converted to the 'dry' process, (Note: In the wet process, the feed material is ground to a slurry and then roasted in a kiln. The dry process has all dry ingredients. The wet process has about 30-40% moisture. A third process, the semi-dry (or semi-wet process), has 15-20% moisture. Many cement makers have moved onto the dry process because it is more energy efficient.) which started in 1970 with two kilns, but with a greater output in tonnage, with the same amount of fuel used.

Since 1951, when the Peak District National Park was created, most of the outbound traffic from the plant has been exported by rail. This requirement is still in effect in the 21st century, with the authorities continuing their desire for rail to manage the lion's share of the traffic to and from the plant. The creation of the national park has also affected expansion and quarrying locations as the planning permission regulations are more stringent within a national park.

Hope Cement Works in 1982

The plant was acquired in 2001 by Lafarge, following their takeover of Blue Circle Cement. The merger of Lafarge and the Tarmac Group was allowed on condition that certain elements of both groups be sold off to prevent the new company having a monopoly in certain areas. This meant the cement works at Hope became owned by the Mittal Group, and was renamed Hope Construction Materials in 2013. In 2016, Hope Construction Materials was acquired by Breedon for £336 million, which included various aggregate terminals and cement and concrete plants. After the closure of other cement plants it is now the largest cement producer by tonnage in the United Kingdom.

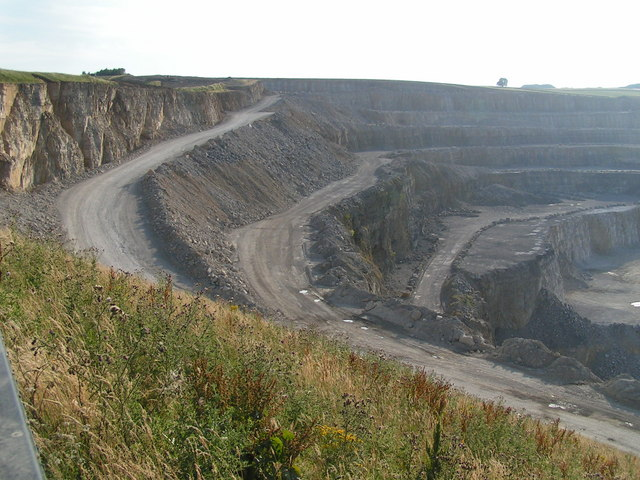
Hope Quarry

Around 66% of the works output (1,000,000 tonnes (1,100,000 tons)) is transported from the site via the railway link connecting to the Hope Valley Line. The railway line runs for 1 mile 52 chains (2.7 km) and connects with the seven road sidings called Earle's Sidings.

Destinations formerly served have included Northenden (Manchester), Dewsbury in West Yorkshire, Tanhouse Lane at Widnes, and bagged cement to Carlisle. In the privatisation era, newer destinations served by Hope came on stream due to rationalisation in the cement and railway industries; the terminals at Northenden and Widnes were replaced by one at Weaste, and Hope despatched cement to Theale, Colnbrook and Moorswater in Cornwall. In 2020, depots for onward transportation of cement by rail were located at Dewsbury, Walsall, Reading (Theale), and Dagenham.

A study in 2020 determined that the plant supported a total of 270 jobs and brought over £60 million into the local economy.

In 2024 the site's primary crusher, which had been in operation since 1952, was replaced as part of a major upgrade.

== Tonnages ==
In 2008, the plant was producing around 1,400,000 tonnes (1,500,000 tons) per annum, with a view to the limestone reserves lasting until 2038. However, a report from 2012 estimated that the limestone at the adjacent quarry will be exhausted by 2034. At that time, the works was producing 1,580,000 tonnes (1,740,000 tons) of cement per year. When the plant was hived off into its own company (Hope Construction Materials, which also operated other quarries) its market share of UK cement consumption was 12% (2012). By 2018, the market share was 15%, though the market fluctuates.

== Fuels ==
The traditional fuel used in the kilns has been coal, however, efforts have been made to try alternative sources as in 2010 when sewage pellets were burnt instead of coal. The whole of the Peak District National Park emitted 1,648,890 tonnes (1,817,590 tons) of CO_{2} in 2006, 65% of which was emitted by the cement works at Hope. The use of chipped tyres and petroleum coke in 2002/2003, reduced the NO_{x} gases, but increased the sulphur emitted. The main chimney stack at Hope is 433 feet (132 m) high.

Hope Cement lodged an application to increase the amount of raw materials railed into the site. Part of the manufacturing process of cement uses pulverised fuel ash (PFA) a by-product of burning coal in power stations. As this industry went into a sharp decline from 2015 onwards, alternative raw materials (ARM), such as slate quarry fines, marl, fireclay etc., could be used instead. However, ARMs typically have a higher moisture content, which is driven off in the roasting part of the cement making, and thus requires a higher tonnage of material than PFA. The application requires about 250,000 tonnes (280,000 tons) to be imported into the site per year.

== Owners ==
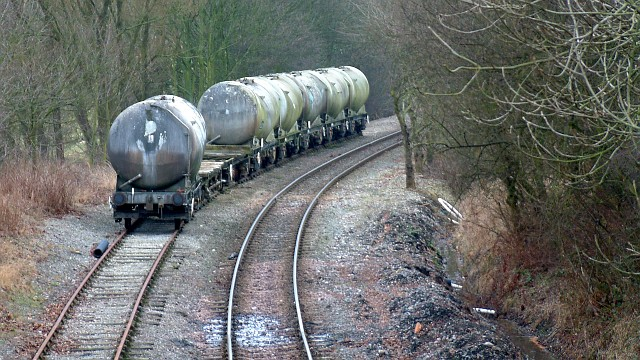
Abandoned cement wagons on the connecting railway

- 1929–c. 1935 G.T. Earle
- c. 1935–1978 BPCM
- 1978–2001 Blue Circle
- 2001–2013 Lafarge
- 2013–2016 Hope Construction Materials
- 2016–(present) Breedon
