= Hope War Memorial =

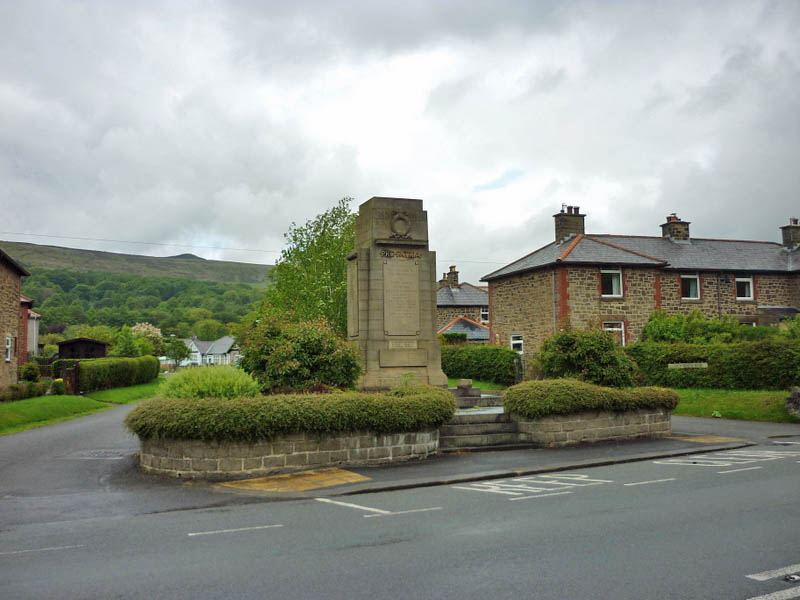
- Hope War Memorial

- Location in Derbyshire
- 53°20′51″N 1°44′28″W
- Location: Hope, Derbyshire, England

Listed Building – Grade II
- Official name: War Memorial
- Designated: 24 September 1984
- Reference no.: 1334500

Hope War Memorial is a 20th-century grade II listed war memorial in Hope, Derbyshire.

== History ==
The sandstone memorial is dedicated to the inhabitants of Hope, Aston, Thornhill, Brough and Shatton, that died during the First and Second World Wars.

The memorial has been Grade II listed since 24 September 1984.

== See also ==
- Listed buildings in Hope, Derbyshire
