= Amit Bhatia =

British businessman

- Born: London, United Kingdom; 4 September 1979 (age 47)
- Education: Cornell University
- Occupations: Vice-chairman Liverpool F.C.; Managing Director AyBe Capital Advisers; Chairman Breedon Group; Founding Partner Summix Capital
- Spouse: Vanisha Mittal (m. 2004)
- Children: 3

Amit Bhatia (born 4 September 1979) is a British-Indian businessman, entrepreneur, and investor. He is a founder and managing director of AyBe Capital Advisers (formerly known as Swordfish Investments) and was an owner and director of Queens Park Rangers between 2007 and 2026. Bhatia is also the chairman of Breedon Group, an independent construction material supplier in the UK, and a founding partner of Summix Capital, a real estate private equity firm.

== Early life and education ==
Bhatia went on to study economics at Cornell University in the United States, where he was given the 2001 Class Award. He maintains a relationship with Cornell, having been on the university’s External Advisory Council for Internationalization and a guest lecturer at the Johnson School of Management. He has endowed several scholarships for undergraduates’ students, and grants for PhD students at Cornell University over the past twenty years. The Amit Bhatia Libe Café at Cornell’s Olin Library is named after him.

== Career ==
Bhatia worked at Merrill Lynch and Morgan Stanley in New York, before moving to Credit Suisse First Boston in London. In 2004, he set up AyBe Capital Advisers (previously Swordfish Investments), a private equity and venture capital firm with investments in sectors including education, media, telecommunications, financial services, technology, consumer goods, and real estate.

In 2010, Bhatia set up the Bhatia Family Foundation (originally known as The Global Relief Initiative). The Foundation supports causes in the UK and India.

In 2013, Bhatia set up Hope Construction Materials, a cement and aggregates company, formed following the divestment of 200 sites by Tarmac Group and Lafarge. Hope was the first UK construction firm to join the World Economic Forum’s Global Growth Companies (GGC) community. In 2016, Bhatia sold Hope Construction to Breedon Aggregates, joining the board of the newly-formed Breedon Group PLC, where he is chairman and remains the largest shareholder.

Bhatia is a founding partner of Summix Capital, a strategic land fund with a diverse real estate portfolio in the UK and Ireland.

Bhatia has been on the advisory boards for Metro Bank and AirAsia Berhad. He is on the advisory board of the Cultural Affairs and International Relations (CAIR) unit within the Ministry of Culture (MOC), Kingdom of Saudi Arabia (KSA).

Bhatia was awarded the Young Entrepreneur of the Year title by Prime Minister Theresa May, and the Outstanding Young Executive of the Year.

== Involvement in sports ==
Bhatia's association with Queens Park Rangers Football Club (QPR) began in 2007. He served as vice-chairman until 2018, and chairman from 2018 to 2023. Beyond his leadership at QPR, Bhatia has been an advocate for the development of football in India through his Foundation and the club’s outreach programs.

The Bhatia family's continued support resulted in the South Africa Road Stand at Loftus Road being renamed the Bhatia Stand.

Bhatia resigned his position as a director of QPR in July 2026, after 18 years with the club.

In August 2026, Bhatia bought a stake in Liverpool F.C., becoming the club's new vice-chairman subject to regulatory approval.
