= Listed buildings in Bradwell, Derbyshire =

Bradwell is a civil parish in the Derbyshire Dales district of Derbyshire, England. The parish contains ten listed buildings that are recorded in the National Heritage List for England. All the listed buildings are designated at Grade II, the lowest of the three grades, which is applied to "buildings of national importance and special interest". The parish contains the village of Bradwell and the surrounding countryside. The listed buildings consist of houses and cottages, churches, and a public house.

== Buildings ==
Name and location	Photograph	Date	Notes
Smalldale Hall, Farmhouse and barn 53.32927°N 1.75072°W		1670	A house later divided with an attached barn, the building is in limestone with gritstone dressings, and quoins. The roof is partly in stone slate and partly in slate, and moulded copings and kneelers to the west gable. There are two storeys, the hall to the west has three bays, and the farmhouse has two. The doorway has a chamfered quoined surround, a four-centred arch, a lintel with a dated panel, and a hood mould. Most of the windows are mullioned, with some mullions removed, and they contain casements. To the east is a lower barn dating from the 19th century, with three doorways and vents.
The White Hart Inn; 53.32717°N 1.74192°W		1676	A house, later a public house, it was altered in the 19th century. It is in rendered stone, with painted stone dressings, and a slate roof with a coped gable and a kneeler to the east. There are two storeys and attics, two bays, and a single-storey lean-to on the east. The central doorway has a quoined surround, the windows are sashes, and in the attics are casement windows.
Scout headquarters 53.32711°N 1.74441°W	—	1754	A Presbyterian chapel later used for other purposes, it is in limestone with gritstone dressings, quoins, and a tile roof. Above the doorway is a small dated plaque, and the windows are mullioned and transomed cross windows.
Joiners Cottage; 53.32717°N 1.74160°W		Late 18th century	A pair of cottages, later combined, they are in gritstone with bands of limestone, gritstone dressings, quoins, a roof of slate with crested ridge tiles at the front, and stone slate at the rear. There are two storeys, a double-depth plan, and two bays. In the centre are paired doorways, and the windows are mullioned with casements.
Sidney Cottage; 53.32695°N 1.74238°W		Late 18th century	The cottage is in limestone with gritstone dressings, quoins, and a stone slate roof. There are two storeys, and three bays, the left bay recessed. The windows are mullioned, with two lights and casements.
Lyndale House, coach house and pigsty 53.32606°N 1.73898°W	—	Late 18th to early 19th century	A public house, later a private house, it is in gritstone, with a roof of slate and some stone slabs. There are two storeys, a front of three bays, and extensions at the rear. The central doorway has pilasters and a moulded hood on brackets, and the windows on the front are sashes. At the rear are a former coach house and a pigsty with a feeding trough.
Methodist church 53.32657°N 1.74165°W		1807	The church was restored in 1891 when the portico was added. It is in limestone with gritstone dressings, quoins, bands, and a roof of stone slate, with slate on the chancel. The front has two storeys, three bays, and a pedimented gable with an inscribed plaque in the tympanum. In the centre is a portico with four Tuscan columns and a balustraded parapet, and the windows are sashes with round-arched heads.
Stanley House and stable block 53.32695°N 1.74176°W		Early 19th century	A pair of houses, later extended and combined, with an attached stable block, the building is in gritstone on a plinth, with quoins, a coved eaves cornice, an embattled parapet on the extension, and a hipped stone slate roof. There are two storeys, an L-shaped plan, a front of two bays, and an extension to the right. On the front are two central doorways with quoined surrounds and a continuous moulded hood. The windows are sashes in the original part, and in the extension are casement windows. To the south is a rendered stable block with a segmental-headed archway.
Brook House; 53.32602°N 1.74057°W		1826	A Sunday school built over a brook, it was converted into a private house in 1978. It is in rendered stone, with painted stone dressings and a stone slate roof. There are two storeys, four bays and a later porch, and the brook runs through a segmental-arched tunnel. The ground floor windows were added in the 20th century, and have raised lintels and impost blocks. In the upper floor are windows with pointed heads, Gothic tracery in the upper part, and a casement window below.
St Barnabas' Church; 53.32640°N 1.73870°W		1867–68	The tower was added to the church in 1888–91. The church is built in limestone with gritstone dressings, and has a roof of Westmorland slate with terracotta ridge tiles on the nave. It consists of a nave, a chancel and north vestry, and a southwest tower. The tower has three stages, stepped corner buttresses, a south doorway with a pointed head and a hood mould, over which is a niche with an ogee head, string courses, clock faces, gargoyles, and an embattled parapet. On the east gable of the nave is a bellcote.
