= Listed buildings in Hope, Derbyshire =

Hope is a civil parish in the High Peak district of Derbyshire, England. The parish contains 23 listed buildings that are recorded in the National Heritage List for England. Of these, one is listed at Grade I, the highest of the three grades, and the others are at Grade II, the lowest grade. The parish contains the village of Hope and the surrounding countryside. Most of the listed buildings are houses, farmhouses and farm buildings. The other listed buildings include a church and items in the churchyard, a cross converted into a guide post, a hotel, a former toll house, two mileposts, the engine house and chimney of a former lead mine, a school, and a war memorial.

== Key ==
Grade	Criteria
I	Buildings of exceptional interest, sometimes considered to be internationally important
II	Buildings of national importance and special interest

== Buildings ==
Name and location	Photograph	Date	Notes	Grade
Cross shaft, St Peter's Church; 53.34776°N 1.74263°W		11th century	The cross shaft in the churchyard has been constructed from two pieces divided by arched moulding. The top piece tapers, and contains carvings of faces. The lower part has more faces, interlace decoration and leaf motifs.	II
St Peter's Church; 53.34787°N 1.74261°W		Early 14th century	The oldest part of the church, which has been altered and extended through the centuries, is the tower, and the chancel was rebuilt in 1881–82. The church is built in gritstone and has a stainless steel roof. It consists of a nave with a clerestory, north and south aisles, a south porch, a chancel, and a west steeple. The steeple has a tower with three stages, angle buttresses, a two-light west window, two-light bell openings, and a squat broach spire. On the body of the church are embattled parapets, crocketed pinnacles, and gargoyles. The porch has two storeys, and to its left is a polygonal stair turret. It contains an entrance with a moulded surround, above which is a niche containing a statue.	I
Churchyard cross, St Peter's Church; 53.34769°N 1.74260°W		Medieval	The remains of the cross are in gritstone, the medieval part consisting of five polygonal steps. On these is a 20th-century shaft, polygonal at the base, and narrower and circular above.	II
Hope Cross; 53.38350°N 1.75937°W		Medieval	A cross converted into a guide post in 1737, it is in gritstone, and consists of a pier about 7 feet (2.1 m) high. The top is inscribed with the date and the names of surrounding towns.	II
Greaves Cottage; 53.35377°N 1.74601°W		Late 17th century	The house is in gritstone with quoins, and a stone slate roof with coped gables. There are two storeys and three bays. The doorway has a moulded surround, and the windows are mullioned with two lights.	II
Kilnhill Farmhouse; 53.35164°N 1.74361°W		Early 18th century	A gritstone house with quoins and a stone slate roof. There are two storeys and two bays. The central doorway has a stone surround, a keystone, and a bracketed hood. The windows on the front are sashes and at the rear are mullioned windows.	II
Daggers House; 53.34747°N 1.74115°W		Mid 18th century	Originally an inn, the house is in gritstone, with quoins, floor bands with cornice moulding at the angles, and a roof of Welsh slate and stone slate with copings and moulded kneelers. There are two storeys and attics, a front of three bays, and two rear gabled wings. The central doorway has a moulded surround, a semicircular traceried fanlight, and a bracketed hood. This is flanked by paired sash windows with a mullion, in the upper floor are sash windows, and the attic contains lunettes.	II
Gate piers, St Peter's Church; 53.34814°N 1.74259°W		18th century	The gate piers and attached stile at the entrance to the churchyard are in gritstone. The piers have a square plan, moulded cornices and acorn finials. To the west is a squeezer stile, consisting of two slabs of gritstone, the upper parts cut away.	II
Ebenezer House and outbuilding 53.34946°N 1.74291°W		1770	The house and the attached outbuilding, dated 1839, are in gritstone, partly rendered, with a stone slate roof and two storeys. The house has three bays, a central doorway with a bracketed hood, sash windows, and a circular datestone. The outbuilding to the west has quoins, and a central segmental carriage arch with a dated keystone. It contains a doorway with a quoined surround, and windows, including a circular window.	II
Old Hall Hotel; 53.34820°N 1.74227°W		Late 18th century	The hotel is in gritstone, partly rendered, with quoins, and Welsh slate roofs with coped gables and moulded kneelers. There are two storeys and attics, and a front of three bays. The windows in the lower two floors are sashes, those in the ground floor tripartite, and on the front is a blocked doorway.	II
Toll Cottage; 53.35346°N 1.74529°W		c.1800	The former toll house is in gritstone with quoins and a stone slate roof. There are two storeys at the rear, and a single storey facing the road. In the centre is a doorway with a Tudor arched head flanked by fixed windows. At the rear are garage doors, a doorway, and three two-light mullioned windows.	II
Eccles House Farmhouse; 53.34050°N 1.74114°W	—	1814	The farmhouse is in gritstone with quoins and a Welsh slate roof. There are two storeys and three bays. On the front is a central doorway with a bracketed hood and sash windows. At the rear is a doorway with a dated lintel, and the windows are mullioned, one with an inscribed lintel and another with an inscribed sill.	II
Bleak House; 53.35422°N 1.74725°W		Early 19th century	The house is in limestone with gritstone dressings and a stone slate roof. There are two storeys and three bays. In the centre is a doorway with a rusticated surround. Above it is an arched casement window with a keystone and impost blocks, and the other windows are sashes.	II
Brough House; 53.33885°N 1.73109°W	—	Early 19th century	The house is in gritstone with quoins and a stone slate roof. There are two storeys, an L-shaped plan, and a front of three bays. The central doorway has a stone surround, a keystone, and a flat bracketed hood. The windows are sashes.	II
Barn southeast of Brough House; 53.33879°N 1.73060°W	—	Early 19th century	The barn is in gritstone with quoins, a stone slate roof, and two storeys. In the centre is a cart entry with a segmental arch, a quoined surround, and voussoirs. This is flanked by doorways, and in the upper floor are two square openings, all of which have quoined surrounds.	II
Barns north of Eccles House Farmhouse; 53.34072°N 1.74071°W	—	Early 19th century	Two ranges of barns in gritstone with quoins slate roofs, and two storeys, the left range recessed. The barns contain four doorways with massive jambs and lintels, three doorways with quoined surrounds, windows, two of them circular, and external stone steps.	II
Milepost, Station Road; 53.34691°N 1.73852°W		Early 19th century	The milepost is on the southwest side of Station Road (A6187 road). It is in cast iron with a triangular plan and a swept top. The milepost is inscribed with the distances to Castleton, Chapel-en-le-Frith, Sheffield, and Hathersage.	II
Milepost, Castleton Road; 53.34740°N 1.76183°W		Early 19th century	The milepost is on the south side of Castleton Road (A6187 road). It is in cast iron with a triangular plan and a swept top. The milepost is inscribed with the distances to Castleton, Chapel-en-le-Frith, Sheffield, and Hathersage.	II
Pindale Mine Engine House and chimney 53.33997°N 1.75680°W		Early 19th century	The engine house and the chimney to the former lead mine are in gritstone. The engine house has a slate roof and two storeys, and contains a tall round-arched opening, a doorway, and a window. A low coped wall leads to the chimney, which has a square plan, and a band at about half height, above which it tapers to a coped top.	II
Spring House Farmhouse; 53.35308°N 1.76648°W		Early 19th century	The farmhouse is in limestone and gritstone with gritstone dressings, an embattled parapet, and a Welsh slate roof with coped gables. There are two storeys, a double depth plan, three bays, and a lower recessed single bay on the left. The doorway has a plain surround and a rectangular fanlight, and the windows are sashes.	II
Burghwash Farmhouse and outbuilding 53.33948°N 1.72845°W		1838	The farmhouse and attached outbuilding are in limestone, mainly rendered, with gritstone dressings, quoins, and a Welsh slate roof. There are two storeys, and the house has three bays, a central doorway, and sash windows. The outbuilding to the right contains a tall carriage entry with a segmental arch and a keystone, flanked by doorways of differing heights.	II
Hope Primary School; 53.35017°N 1.74353°W		1912	The school, designed by George H. Widdows, is in polygonal gritstone with a tile Mansard roof. There is mainly a single storey, a main range of four bays, and flanking projecting gabled cross-wings. In each bay is a tall window, and the roof sweeps down between them. The left gable has a large central window and small flanking windows. In the right gable are two storeys, with two windows in the lower floor and a single window above. At the rear are double doors in the east gable, under a semicircular head, that lead into a corridor, originally open and later closed, and above are flat-roofer dormers.	II
War memorial 53.34766°N 1.74092°W		c. 1920	The war memorial stands on an island on a road junction. It is in gritstone, and consists of a cenotaph on two steps. On the south face is an inscription, a cornice and a wreath, and there are panels with names on all the faces. The memorial is in a raised area enclosed by low walls with chamfered copings.	II
