= St Peter's Church, Hope =

St Peter’s Church, Hope
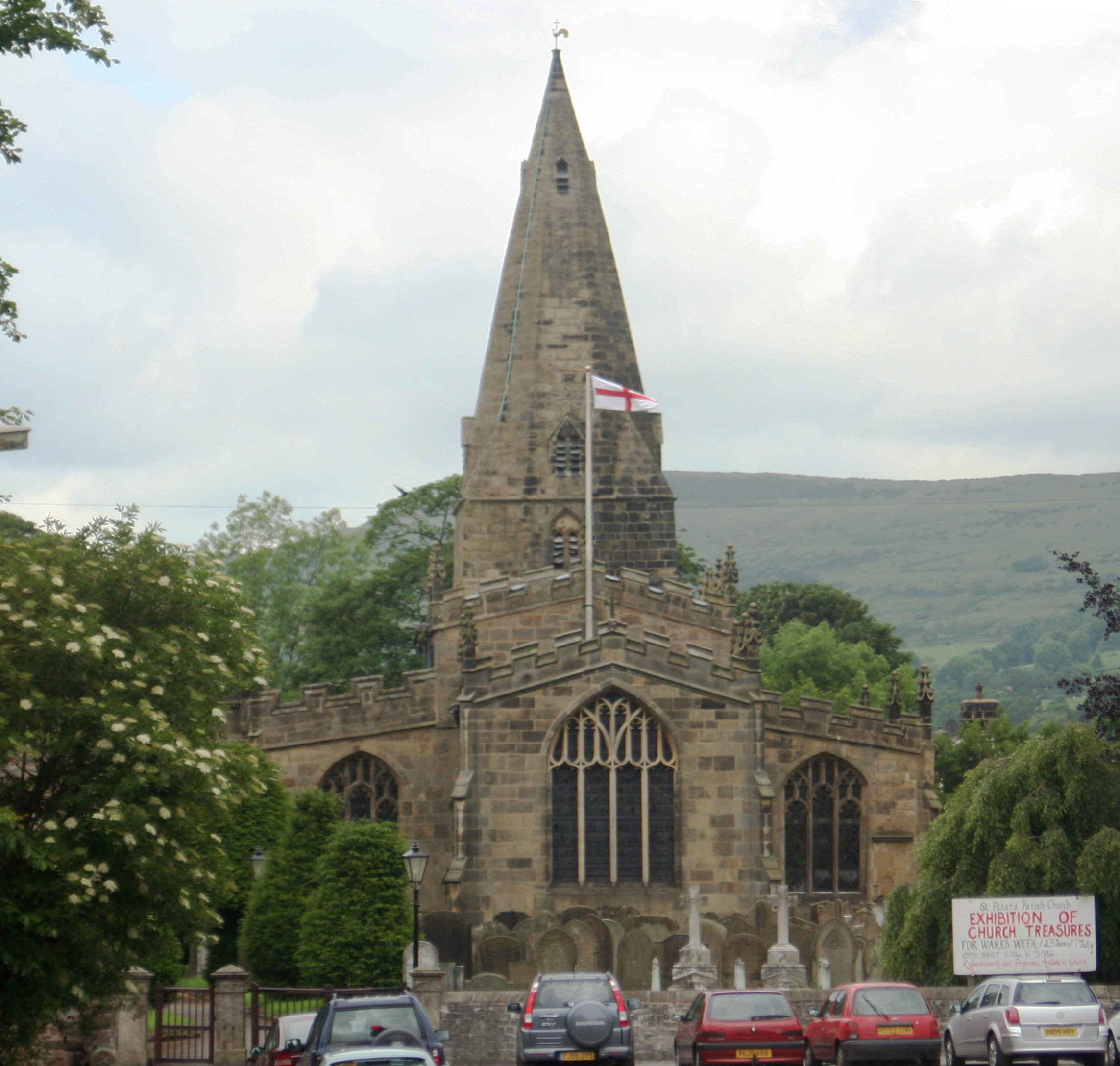
- St Peter’s Church, Hope
- St Peter’s Church, Hope
- 53°20′52.2″N 1°44′34″W
- Location: Hope, Derbyshire
- Country: England
- Denomination: Church of England

History
- Dedication: St Peter

Architecture
- Heritage designation: Grade I listed
- Designated: 21 April 1967

Administration
- Diocese: Diocese of Derby
- Archdeaconry: Chesterfield
- Deanery: Bakewell and Eyam
- Parish: Hope

St Peter’s Church, Hope is a Grade I listed parish church in the Church of England in Hope, Derbyshire.

The Domesday Book records that Hope had a church although the present parish church, the Church of St Peter, dates from the 14th and 15th centuries with modifications to the chancel dating from 1882.

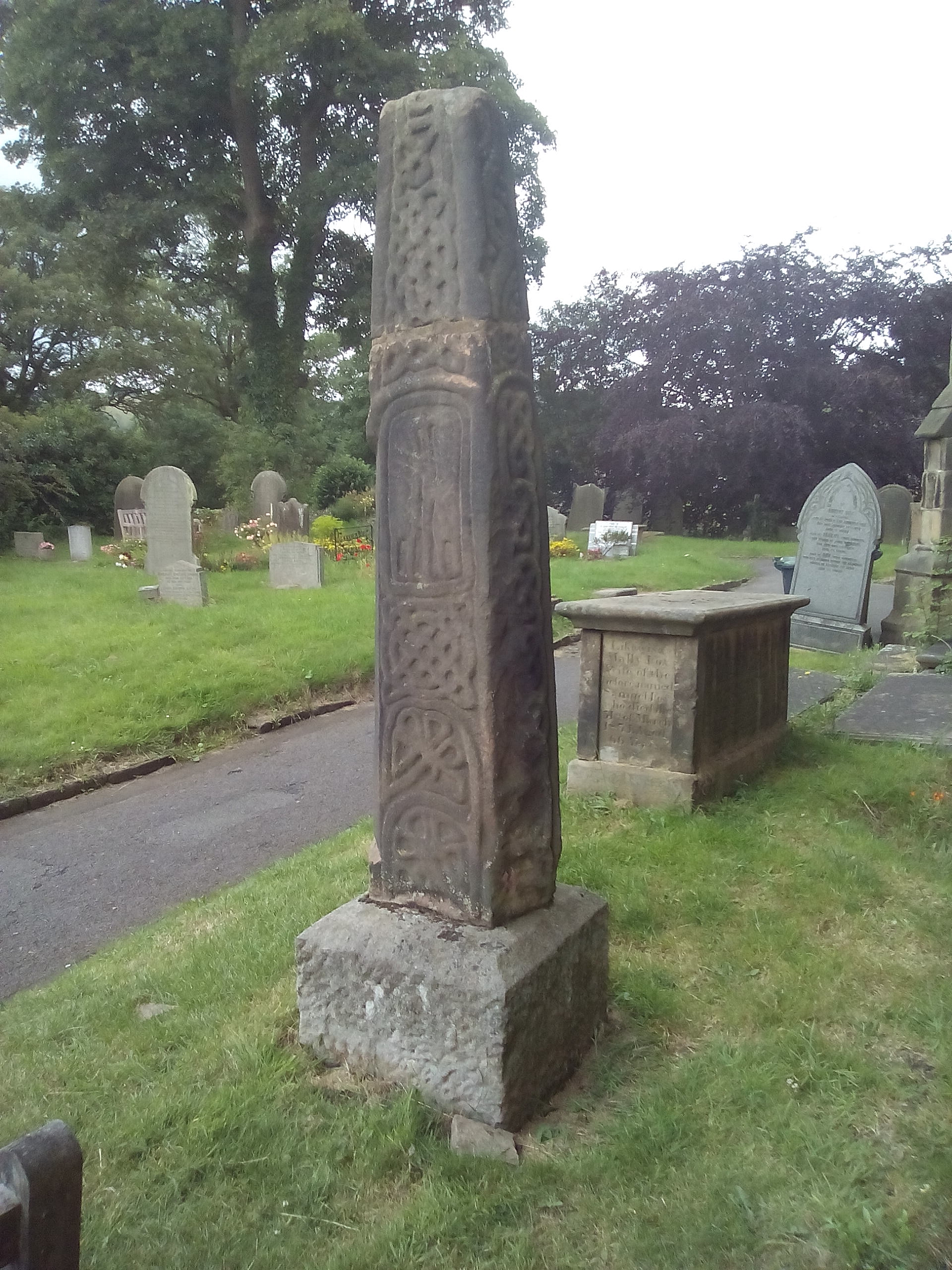
Anglo-Saxon cross

The church has two ancient crosses in its grounds. The shaft of a sandstone cross dating from the Anglo-Saxon period stands seven feet high and is carved on all faces. The cross may well have originated in the church grounds and a possible base now supports a sundial, but from the English Civil War until 1858 it was hidden in the village school. The stump of the Eccles Cross, originally near Eccles House, south of Hope, is also in the graveyard.

Between 2 and 28 July 2011, the church was broken into and about 15 items dating as far back as 1662, including two silver chalices and a pewter plate, were found to have been stolen.

== History ==
The church dates from the early 14th century. There were restorations in 1728–30 which included the rebuilding of the tower. A subsequent restoration was undertaken by Alfred Hill of Litton, Derbyshire, in 1887 when new windows were inserted and the floor was relaid. A new clock with chimes was inserted in the tower.

A further restoration was carried out on the chancel in 1908 by Charles Hadfield of Sheffield, when five stained glass windows were inserted.

== Parish status ==
The church is in a joint parish with

- St Barnabas' Church, Bradwell
- St Edmund’s Church, Castleton

== Organ ==
The church contains a pipe organ by Brindley & Foster dating from 1883. It was opened on 23 November 1883 A specification of the organ can be found on the National Pipe Organ Register.

== See also ==
- Grade I listed churches in Derbyshire
- Grade I listed buildings in Derbyshire
- Listed buildings in Hope, Derbyshire
