= Breedon Group =

British construction materials company

- Traded as: LSE: BREE
- Industry: Construction & Materials
- Founded: 2008
- Headquarters: Breedon On The Hill, Leicestershire
- Number of locations: 300
- Area served: United Kingdom & Republic of Ireland
- Key people: Amit Bhatia (Non-Executive Chairman); Rob Wood (Group Chief Executive)
- Products: Aggregates, asphalt, ready-mixed concrete, contract surfacing & highway maintenance, cement, bitumen, bricks, tiles, concrete & clay products
- Brands: Whitemountain; Lagan; Breedon Golden Amber Gravel; Breedon Fyfestone; 1stMix; Breedon Cement; Welsh Slate
- Revenue: ▲£1,713.8 million (2025)
- Operating income: ▼£169.7 million (2025)
- Net income: ▼£83.9 million (2025)
- Number of employees: 4,900 (2026)
- Divisions: Breedon Southern; Breedon Northern; Breedon Cement; Whitemountain (NI); Lagan (RoI)
- Website: www.breedongroup.com

Breedon Group plc (formerly Ennstone plc) is a British construction materials company which has its headquarters at Breedon on the Hill, Leicestershire, England. It is listed on the London Stock Exchange and is a constituent of the FTSE 250 Index.

Breedon was traditionally centered around the quarrying of stone at Breedon on the Hill since the late 1800s. During 2000, Breedon was purchased by the Midlands-based aggregates firm Ennstone. In 2009, Ennstone entered administration and was acquired by the investment company Marwyn Materials, after which the firm was reorganised into Breedon Aggregates. Throughout the early 2010s, Breedon completed numerous acquisitions, both of whole companies and assets of larger competitors, such as Aggregate Industries and Marshalls plc. In 2016, the firm was cleared by the Competition and Markets Authority (CMA) to complete its purchase of Hope Construction Materials. Two years later, CMA also cleared a complex transaction between Breedon and rival firm Tarmac under which numerous plants, quarries, and cash were exchanged. During 2020, Breedon was again cleared to take over 49 ready-mix plants, 28 aggregate quarries, 14 asphalt plants and numerous other operations under a £178 million deal with Cemex.

In May 2023, Breedon was listed for the first time on the main market of the London Stock Exchange. It has maintained its acquisitive strategy, which has included an expansion of its presence in the North American market via the purchase of BMC Enterprises. The firm's current chairman is Amit Bhatia, son-in-law of Lakshmi Mittal, the billionaire steel magnate who became a Breedon shareholder following the acquisition of Hope Construction Materials.

== History ==
Breedon has long been headquartered in the village and parish of Breedon on the Hill, where stone has been quarried since the late 1800s. During 2000, Breedon, along with its Breedon Hill and Cloud Hill quarries, was acquired by Ennstone, a Midlands-based aggregates group. The quarry at Breedon produces both limestone and gravel.

During March 2009, due to the 2008 financial crisis, Ennstone went into administration and started selling off its divisions. In 2010, Ennstone was acquired by building materials industry veterans Peter Tom, chairman of the Leicester Tigers rugby club, and Simon Vivian, through their investment company, Marwyn Materials. Their strategy for the combined business, which they named Breedon Aggregates, was to grow the company via the acquisition of small, often family-owned operations, in an industry generally regarded as having high barriers to entry.

Throughout the early 2010s, Breedon undertook numerous acquisitions. During July 2011, it purchased the collapsed firm C&G Concrete Ltd under a £10.15 million that rescued 130 jobs. In January 2012, the firm also bought another concrete company, Nottingham Readymix. During April 2013, Breedon acquired assets in Scotland valued at £34 million from Aggregate Industries as well as £19 million of assets from Marshalls plc. That same month, Peter Tom, the firm's chief executive, publicly stated his ambition to expand via more acquisitions and that the aggregates market had ‘bottomed-out’. Breedon's turnover and profit figures both climbed considerable during the first half of 2013.

In February 2016, the British Government's Competition and Markets Authority (CMA) announced it would investigate the proposed acquisition of Hope Construction Materials by Breedon, citing a possible lessening of competition in the building materials industry. The subsequent investigation held that the acquisition would not unduly reduce competition for the production and supply of aggregates, but that there should be further investigation into the supply of ready-mixed concrete. In response to the CMA, Breedon offered to sell 14 concrete plants from a list of 27 sites that the CMA believed would have reduced competition. The CMA accepted Breedon's list of divestments and permitted the acquisition. Plants divested included sites at Cloddach, Moray and Inverness. The £336m cash-and-shares acquisition of Hope closed in August 2016.

During November 2016, Breedon acquired the County Durham-based firm Sherburn Minerals Group for a total consideration of up to £15.7 million. In May 2017, it purchased Pro Mini Mix, a specialist concrete ‘mini mix’ supplier based in Oldbury. Three months later, Breedon acquired Humberside Aggregates, an independent sand & gravel quarry and aggregates merchanting business based at North Cave near Hull in East Yorkshire, for a total consideration of £9.0 million.

In December 2017, Breedon announced its planned acquisition from Tarmac of four quarries and an asphalt plant in exchange for £16.5 million, to be satisfied by the transfer to Tarmac of 27 of its readymix plants and payment of £4.9 million in cash. However, in April 2018, CMA announced that Tarmac had been requested to address "competition concerns" regarding the deal; two months later, clearance was granted.

During February 2018, Breedon was reportedly holding talks with the aim of acquiring a majority stake in the Lagan Group, a construction business that performed quarrying, cement, asphalt and contracting; in April 2018, it was confirmed that Lagan Group had been sold to Breedon for £455 million. During June 2018, the company acquired Blinkbonny Quarry in the Scottish Borders, adding nearly three million tonnes of hard rock to its reserves.

In October 2019, it was announced that the company had purchased Roadway Surfacing & Civil Engineering for up to £13.5 million, establishing it as a fully integrated business in North Wales.

In January 2020, Breedon agreed a £178 million deal with Cemex to take over 49 ready-mix plants, 28 aggregate quarries, four depots, one cement terminal, 14 asphalt plants and four concrete products operations. This deal was temporarily suspended due to CMA ordering that a regulatory investigation be conducted. Once cleared, the transaction was completed in September 2020.

During May 2023, due to the company increasing valuation, it was transferred from the Alternative Investment Market to the main market of the London Stock Exchange. In March 2024, Breedon acquired the US-based firm BMC Enterprises in exchange for £238.1 million.

== Operations ==
Breedon Group produces cement, construction aggregates, asphalt, ready-mixed concrete, bitumen and other construction materials.

The group is reported to hold a total of approximately 900 million tonnes of natural mineral reserves and resources.

Breedon Group owns a 37.5% stake in BEAR Scotland, which maintains roads on behalf of Transport Scotland, and a majority stake in Alba Traffic Management, an Inverness-based firm that provides traffic management services for highway works, events and utilities. Through Mobile Concrete Solutions (MCS), Breedon also operates an on-site concrete batching service, run as a joint venture with construction services company TSL.

== Products ==
Breedon produces a variety of grades of bulk and packed cement, in addition to crushed rock, sand, gravel, agricultural lime and a range of specialist ready-mixed concretes and asphalts. One of its best-known products is Golden Amber Gravel, used for pathways and driveways; it is reportedly the only gravel with a Royal Warrant. Golden Amber is used at Chatsworth House, The National War Memorial Arboretum and the Sandringham Estate.

Other products include speedway shale, which is a mix of crushed limestone and clay laid down to form the competitive surface at motorcycle speedway tracks. Breedon shale is used in international speedway tracks such as Cardiff, Gothenburg and Copenhagen. Breedon developed its shale product alongside former speedway World Champion Ole Olsen and his son Torben.
