= Grey Ditch =

Coordinates: 53°19′59.38″N 1°44′54.76″W

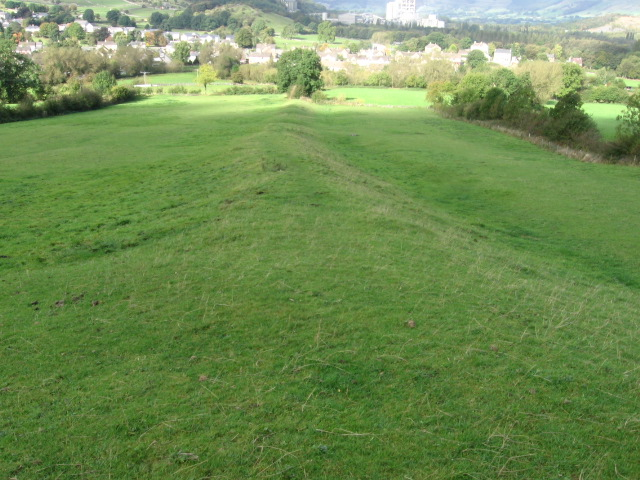
The Grey ditch towards Bradwell

The Grey Ditch, near Bradwell in the Peak District is a linear earthwork of post-Roman date. The dyke is built at right angles to the Batham Gate, a Roman road which runs between the Roman fort at Brough in Derbyshire (the Roman name was Navio) and the Roman settlement at Buxton. When first recorded the length of the Grey Ditch was about 1.7 km long but it now has substantial gaps, caused by ploughing and by development. It currently survives as four sections. The monument runs across the contours and runs along the division between the White Peak and the Dark Peak. The ditch lies on the side towards the northeast. The bank seems to have a single phase while the ditch showed evidence of up to five re-cuts. Importantly the bank lay over a plough soil, which contained sherds of Roman-British pottery. B H O'Neil suggested the Grey Ditch once went as far as the slopes of Mam Tor but there is no firm evidence for this. This area is the boundary between the Pecsaetna (people of the Peak district) and the kingdom of Mercia and the Grey Ditch could be a boundary marker between these groups but again there is no evidence for this.
