= Marshalls plc =

UK construction materials company

- Formerly: Marshalls Group Limited (April–May 2004); Marshalls Group plc (May–July 2004)
- Type: Public limited company
- Traded as: LSE: MSLH
- Industry: Natural stone and concrete hard landscaping
- Founded: 1890; 136 years ago
- Headquarters: Elland, West Yorkshire
- Key people: Vanda Murray (Chair); Simon Bourne (CEO)
- Revenue: ▲£632.1 million (2025)
- Operating income: ▼£32.0 million (2025)
- Net income: ▼£14.4 million (2025)
- Website: marshalls.co.uk

Marshalls plc is a United Kingdom based manufacturer of natural stone and concrete hard landscaping products, supplying the construction, home improvement and landscape markets. It is based in Elland, West Yorkshire. It is listed on the London Stock Exchange.

== History ==
The company was established by Solomon Marshall in 1890. The company acquired Stancliffe Stone for £10 million in June 2001. Marshalls was acknowledged as a Superbrand for the eighth year running in 2017. Marshalls acquired roof manufacturer Marley for £535 million in April 2022.

In December 2023, the company announced the appointment of Matt Pullen as its new chief executive from March 2024, following the departure of Martyn Coffey. Pullen stepped down with immediate effect in November 2025; chief commercial officer Simon Bourne was made interim CEO, and in January 2026 took on the post on a permanent basis.

== Operations ==
The company is also a manufacturer and supplier of water management systems, street furniture and landscape protection products. It operates its own quarries and manufacturing sites in the United Kingdom. It also operates Marshalls NV in Belgium, covering Benelux and Northern France.

The Marshalls Register of approved Landscape Contractors and Driveway Installers is a national network of over 1,150 recommended professionals. Although the contractors are not employed by Marshalls, they agree to abide by the Marshalls installation guidelines and are vetted by Marshalls assessors. The network has an annual awards ceremony.
