= Hope, Derbyshire =

Village in Derbyshire, England

Coordinates: 53.347°N 1.74°W

Hope
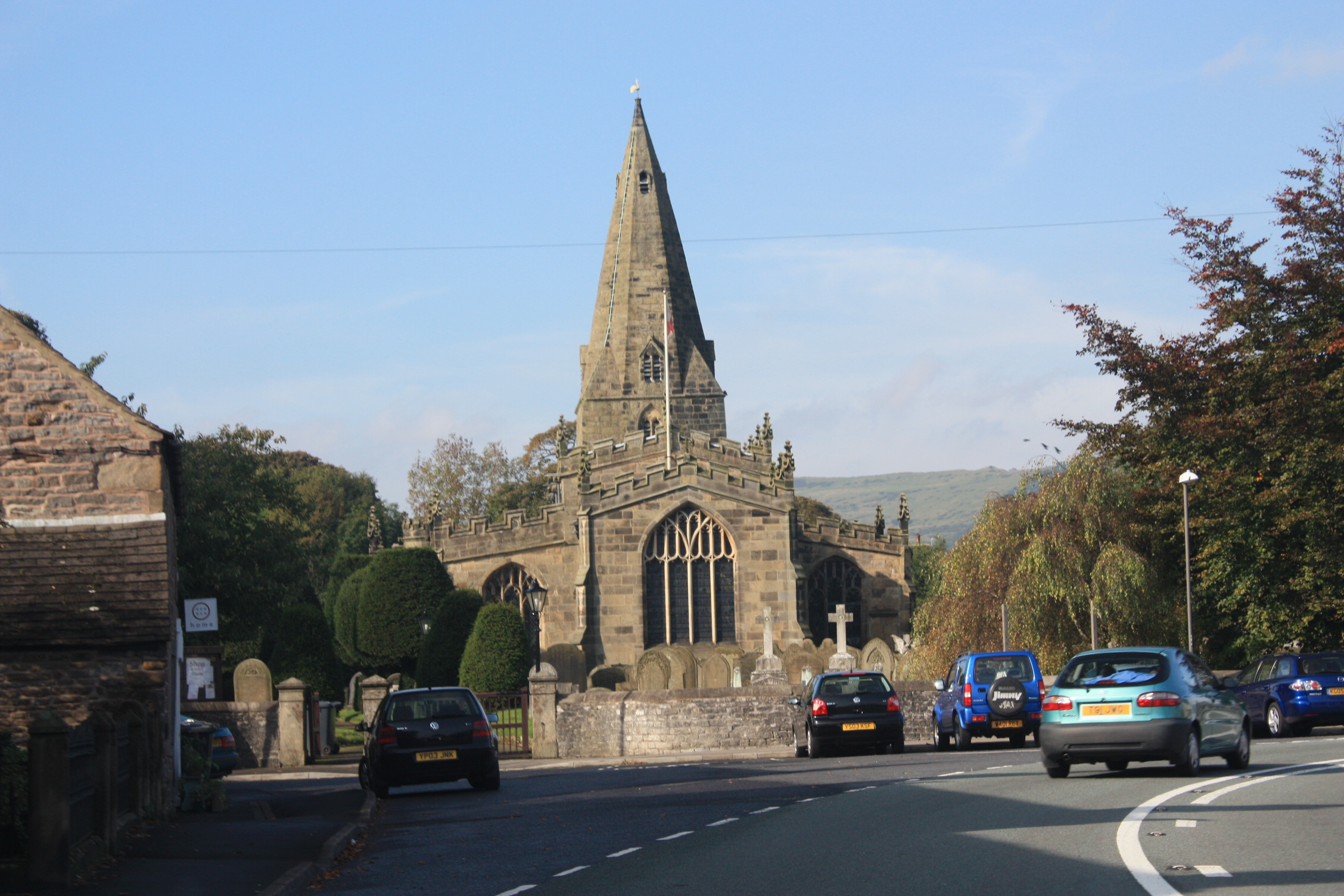
- Parish church of St Peter

- Location within Derbyshire
- Population: 864 (2011)
- District: High Peak
- Shire county: Derbyshire
- Region: East Midlands
- Country: England
- Sovereign state: United Kingdom
- Post town: HOPE VALLEY
- Postcode district: S33
- Dialling code: 01433
- Police: Derbyshire
- Fire: Derbyshire
- Ambulance: East Midlands
- UK Parliament: High Peak

Hope is a village and civil parish in the Derbyshire Peak District, in England. The population at the 2011 Census was 864. It lies in the Hope Valley, at the point where Peakshole Water flows into the River Noe. To the north, Win Hill and Lose Hill stand either side of the Noe.

== History ==
=== Pre-history ===
There is evidence of ancient human occupation of the area around Hope. Mesolithic implements were found by a footpath at Win Hill. A sandstone or ironstone Neolithic axe was found near Hope before 1877 and is now held in the collection at Bolton Museum. The village is close to the Mam Tor hillfort in the adjacent parish of Castleton and human remains and Bronze Age urns were found along with a possible barrow close to the summit of Lose Hill. A Bronze Age barrow known as The Folly, with a diameter of 23 metres (75 ft), is located within the parish, close to Pindale Road.

=== Roman period ===
Traces of a Roman road, Batham Gate, and a Roman fort, Navio, can be found near the hamlet of Brough-on-Noe, just east of the village. There are many remains from the site in Buxton Museum.

=== Saxon period ===
The Anglo-Saxon name of the village, hop, means a small enclosed valley. The name is recorded from 926 AD and in the 1086 AD Domesday Book.

The Roman name of the fort Navio was later changed to the Old English word for fort, brough. Edward the Elder granted lands at Hope to Uhtred, son of Eadulf of Bamburgh. These grants were confirmed by Æthelstan. The Old English gives its name to the adjacent parish of Brough and Shatton, although the fort lies within Hope parish.

=== Medieval period ===
Hope Motte, an earthwork on the bank of the Peakshole Water, is thought to have been constructed during the Norman period and is mentioned in a deed dating from the reign of Edward I. The earthwork is a scheduled monument.

The Domesday Book records that Hope had a church although the present parish church, the Grade I listed Church of St Peter, dates from the 14th and 15th century with modifications to the chancel dating from 1882. The church has two ancient crosses in its grounds. The shaft of a sandstone cross dating from the Anglo-Saxon period stands seven feet high and is carved on all faces. The cross may well have originated in the church grounds and a possible base now supports a sundial, but from the English Civil War until 1858 it was hidden in the village school. The stump of the Eccles Cross, originally near Eccles House, south of Hope, is also in the graveyard. Between 2 and 28 July 2011, the church was broken into and about 15 items dating as far back as 1662, including two silver chalices and a pewter plate, were found to have been stolen.

=== Eighteenth century ===
From 1715 a weekly market was held, along with four annual fairs, one being a hiring fair.

=== Industrial Revolution ===
Lead mining took place in Pindale in the 19th century. The Pindale mine was producing more lead than the Odin Mine between 1800 and 1802. The mine's pumping engine house is still intact.

=== Tin Town ===
Between 1902 and 1916 a "Tin Town" was built at Birchinlee for the workers (and their families) who constructed the Derwent and Howden Dams. In 2014 it was reported that one of these buildings had been salvaged and was now located at Hope where it housed a beauty parlour.

=== World War II ===
On 5 October 1943, a RAF Handley Page Halifax Mark II bomber, HR727, returning to Snaith airfield after a raid over Frankfurt crashed in the Blackden Edge/Ashop Moor area to the east of the Kinder plateau. One of its engines was disabled by an enemy night fighter's guns. Five of the seven crewmen lost their lives.

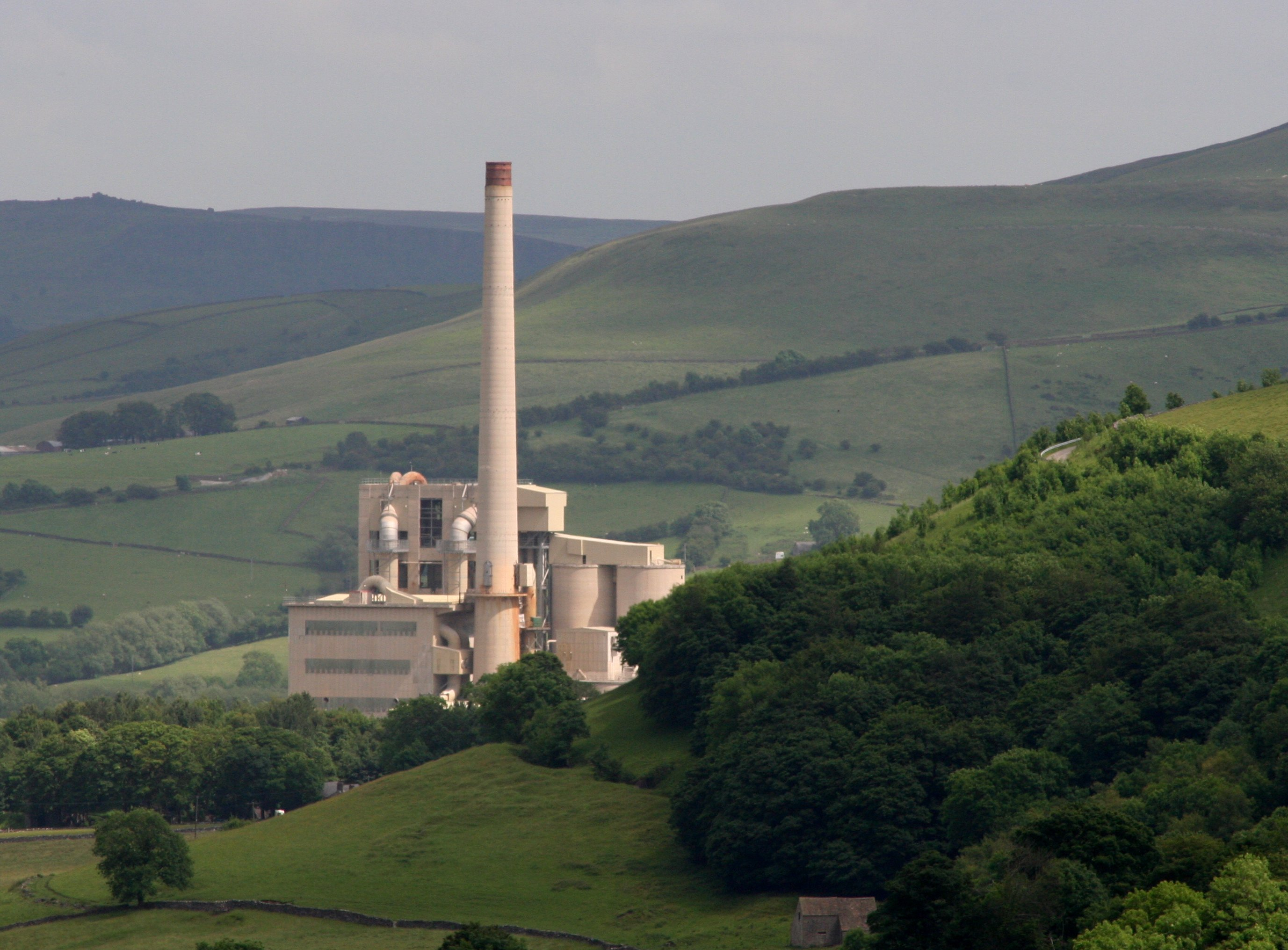
Hope cement works

== Economy ==
Hope is the site of Hope Cement Works, supplied with raw materials by the adjacent quarry in the parish of Bradwell. This cement works is the location of the local volunteer mountain rescue team, Edale Mountain Rescue.

== Culture ==
The village is known for its well dressing.

== Transport ==
Hope railway station lies on the Hope Valley Line between Sheffield and Manchester Piccadilly. Services are generally hourly each way, operated by Northern Trains.

A main road, the old A625, followed the route of the Sheffield & Chapel-en-le-Frith Turnpike Company's road of 1802 through the village and then over Little Mam Tor. The old truncated section of the A625 to Castleton has been re-designated as the A6187, after the Mam Tor section of the road was closed to all traffic in 1979 following one of many landslips.

== Sport ==
In 1944, Hope Sports Club was founded to provide facilities for the village and nearby Aston and Brough.

The village is also home to Hope Valley RUFC, who play their home games at Hope Sports Club. Formed in 1979, after rugby enthusiasts from the local villages organised a match with a barrel of beer for the winners, the club saw success in the 1990s in both the Notts, Lincs & Derbyshire league and cup competitions. Several players went on to represent national league clubs, whilst 2009 to 2011 saw two successive league titles. The club currently competes in the NOWIRUL Division 3 South.

== Education ==
Hope Primary School, built in 1912 to a design by George H. Widdows, serves the village. The building is listed at Grade II. Hope has a small secondary school, Hope Valley College.

== See also ==
- Listed buildings in Hope, Derbyshire
- Hope Cement Works
- Former Hope Cement Works Nunlow, steam locomotive, now at Keighley.
- Hope War Memorial
