= Toponymy =

Study of place names

Toponymy, toponymics, or toponomastics is the study of toponyms (names of places, also known as place names and geographical names), including their origins, meanings, usage, and types. Toponym is the general term for the name of any geographical feature, and the full scope of the term also includes names of all cosmographical features.

In a more specific sense, the term toponymy refers to an inventory of toponyms, while the discipline researching such names is referred to as toponymics or toponomastics. Toponymy is a branch of onomastics, the study of names of all kinds. A person who studies toponymy is called toponymist.

== Etymology ==
The term toponymy comes from Ancient Greek: τόπος / tópos 'place' and ὄνομα / onoma 'name'. The Oxford English Dictionary records toponymy (meaning 'place name') first appearing in English in 1876 in the context of geographical studies. Since then, toponym has come to replace the term place-name in professional discourse among geographers.

== Toponymic typology ==
Toponyms can be divided in two principal groups:

- geonyms: names of all geographical features on Earth
- cosmonyms: names of cosmographical features outside Earth

Various types of geographical toponyms (geonyms) include, in alphabetical order:

- agronyms: names of fields and plains
- choronyms: names of regions or countries
- dromonyms: names of roads or any other transport routes by land, water, or air
- drymonyms: names of woods and forests
- econyms: names of inhabited locations, such as houses, villages, towns, or cities, including:
  - astionyms: names of towns and cities
  - comonyms: names of villages
- hydronyms: names of various bodies of water, including:
  - helonyms: names of swamps, marshes, and bogs
  - limnonyms: names of lakes and ponds
  - oceanonyms: names of oceans
  - pelagonyms: names of seas
  - potamonyms: names of rivers and streams
- insulonyms: names of islands
- metatoponyms: names of places containing recursive elements (e.g., Red River Valley Road)
- oronyms: names of relief features, such as mountains, hills, and valleys, including:
  - speleonyms: names of caves or some other subterranean features
  - petronyms: names of rock formations; also of climbing routes
- urbanonyms: names of urban elements (streets, squares, etc.) in settlements, including:
  - agoronyms: names of squares and marketplaces
  - hodonyms: names of streets and roads

Various types of cosmographical toponyms (cosmonyms) include:

- asteroidonyms: names of asteroids
- astronyms: names of stars and constellations
- cometonyms: names of comets
- meteoronyms: names of meteors
- planetonyms: names of planets and planetary systems

== Toponymic structure ==
Toponyms are often composed of two elements, described as the "generic" and the "specific". The generic identifies the kind of place denoted by the name, while the specific distinguishes the place from others in the same class. In the toponyms Oldham and Newham, for example, the generic is ham (meaning "homestead"), while the specifics are old and new. There are also "simplex" names, which consist of a generic only. English examples include Bath, Chester, and Poole.

== History ==
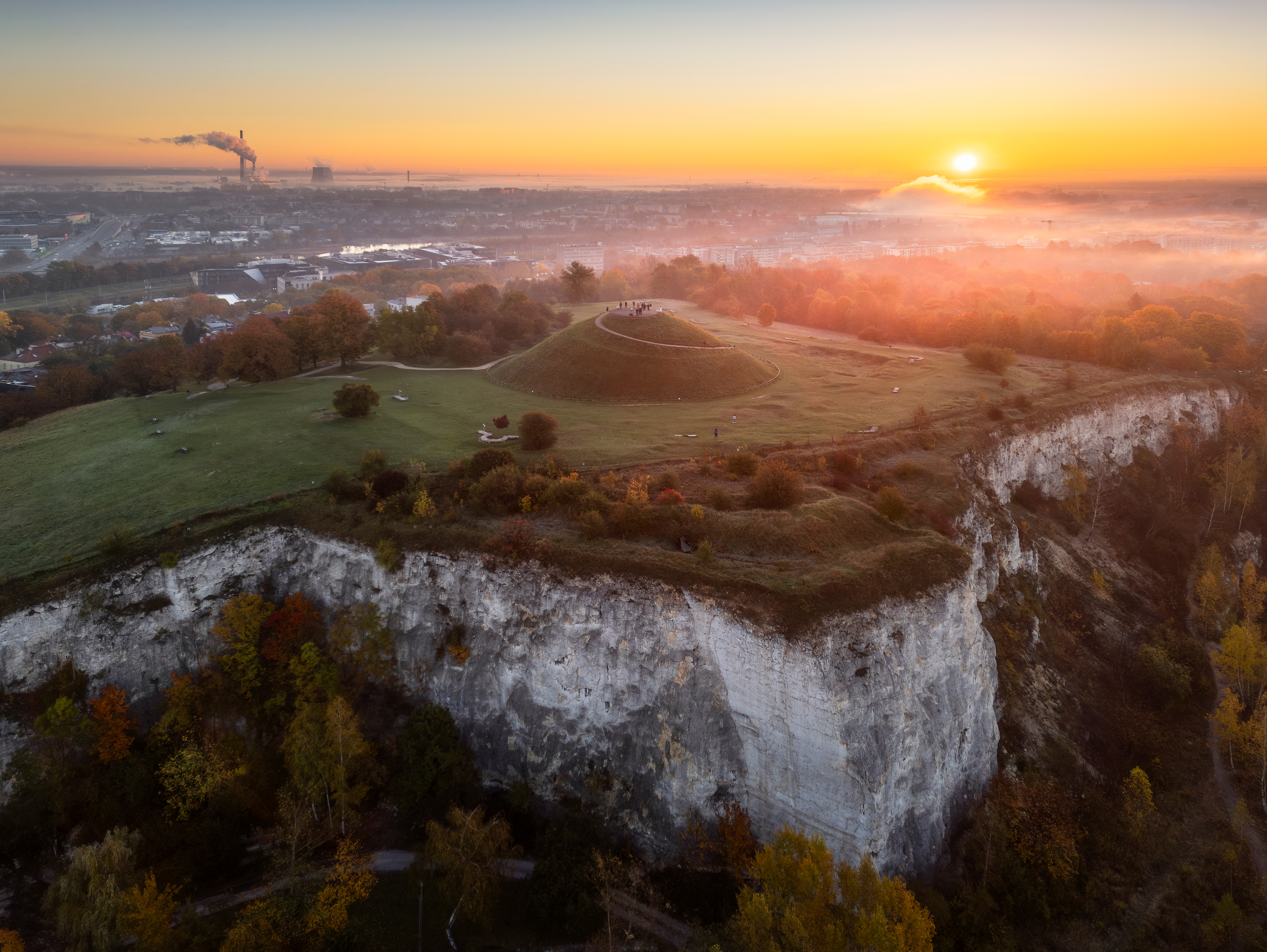
Krakus Mound commemorating Krak, Lechitic founder of Kraków; the ending -ów means possession in Polish

Probably the first toponymists were the storytellers and poets who explained the origin of specific place names as part of their tales; sometimes place-names served as the basis for their etiological legends. The process of folk etymology usually took over, whereby a false meaning was extracted from a name based on its structure or sounds. Thus, for example, the toponym of Hellespont was explained by Greek poets as being named after Helle, daughter of Athamas, who drowned there as she crossed it with her brother Phrixus on a flying golden ram. The name, however, is probably derived from an older language, such as Pelasgian, which was unknown to those who explained its origin. In his Names on the Globe, George R. Stewart theorizes that Hellespont originally meant something like 'narrow Pontus' or 'entrance to Pontus', Pontus being an ancient name for the region around the Black Sea, and by extension, for the sea itself.

Especially in the 19th century, the age of exploration, a lot of toponyms got a different name because of national pride. Thus the famous German cartographer Petermann thought that the naming of newly discovered physical features was one of the privileges of a map editor, especially because he was fed up with forever encountering toponyms such as Victoria, Wellington, Smith, Jones, and so on. He writes: "While constructing the new map to specify the detailed topographical portrayal and after consulting with and authorization of messr. Theodor von Heuglin and count Karl Graf von Waldburg-Zeil I have entered 118 names in the map: partly they are the names derived from celebrities of arctic explorations and discoveries, arctic travellers anyway as well as excellent friends, patrons, and participants of different nationalities in the newest northpolar expeditions, partly eminent German travellers in Africa, Australia, America ...".

Toponyms may have different names through time, due to changes and developments in languages, political developments and border adjustments to name but a few. More recently many postcolonial countries revert to their own nomenclature for toponyms that have been named by colonial powers.

== Toponomastics ==
A toponymist, through well-established local principles and procedures developed in cooperation and consultation with the United Nations Group of Experts on Geographical Names (UNGEGN), applies the science of toponymy to establish officially recognized geographical names. A toponymist relies not only on maps and local histories, but interviews with local residents to determine names with established local usage. The exact application of a toponym, its specific language, its pronunciation, and its origins and meaning are all important facts to be recorded during name surveys.

Scholars have found that toponyms provide valuable insight into the historical geography of a particular region. In 1954, F. M. Powicke said of place-name study that it "uses, enriches and tests the discoveries of archaeology and history and the rules of the philologists."

Toponyms not only illustrate ethnic settlement patterns, but they can also help identify discrete periods of immigration.

Toponymists are responsible for the active preservation of their region's culture through its toponymy. They typically ensure the ongoing development of a geographical names database and associated publications, for recording and disseminating authoritative hard-copy and digital toponymic data. This data may be disseminated in a wide variety of formats, including hard-copy topographic maps as well as digital formats such as geographic information systems, Google Maps, or thesauri like the Getty Thesaurus of Geographic Names.

== Toponymic commemoration ==
In 2002, the United Nations Conference on the Standardization of Geographical Names acknowledged that while common, the practice of naming geographical places after living persons (toponymic commemoration) could be problematic. Therefore, the United Nations Group of Experts on Geographical Names recommends that it be avoided and that national authorities should set their own guidelines as to the time required after a person's death for the use of a commemorative name.

In the same vein, writers Pinchevski and Torgovnik (2002) consider the naming of streets as a political act in which holders of the legitimate monopoly to name aspire to engrave their ideological views in the social space. Similarly, the revisionist practice of renaming streets, as both the celebration of triumph and the repudiation of the old regime is another issue of toponymy. Also, in the context of Slavic nationalism, the name of Saint Petersburg was changed to the more Slavic sounding Petrograd from 1914 to 1924, then to Leningrad following the death of Vladimir Lenin and back to Saint-Peterburg in 1991 following the dissolution of the Soviet Union. After 1830, in the wake of the Greek War of Independence and the establishment of an independent Greek state, Turkish, Slavic and Italian place names were Hellenized, as an effort of "toponymic cleansing." This nationalization of place names can also manifest itself in a postcolonial context.

In Canada, there have been initiatives in recent years "to restore traditional names to reflect the Indigenous culture wherever possible". Indigenous mapping is a process that can include restoring place names by Indigenous communities themselves.

Frictions sometimes arise between countries because of toponymy, as illustrated by the Macedonia naming dispute in which Greece has claimed the name Macedonia, the Sea of Japan naming dispute between Japan and Korea, as well as the Persian Gulf naming dispute. On 20 September 1996 a note on the internet reflected a query by a Canadian surfer, who said as follows: 'One producer of maps labeled the water body "Persian Gulf" on a 1977 map of Iran, and then "Arabian Gulf", also in 1977, in a map which focused on the Gulf States. I would gather that this is an indication of the "politics of maps", but I would be interested to know if this was done to avoid upsetting users of the Iran map and users of the map showing Arab Gulf States'. This symbolizes a further aspect of the topic, namely the spilling over of the problem from the purely political to the economic sphere.

== Geographic names boards ==
A geographic names board is an official body established by a government to decide on official names for geographical areas and features.

Most countries have such a body, which is commonly (but not always) known by this name. In some countries (especially those organised on a federal basis), subdivisions such as individual states or provinces have individual boards.

Individual geographical names boards include:

- Antarctic Place-names Commission
- Commission nationale de toponymie (National toponymy commission - France)
- Geographical Names Board of Canada
- Geographical Names Board of New South Wales
- New Zealand Geographic Board
- South African Geographical Names Council
- United States Board on Geographic Names

== Notable toponymists ==
- Marcel Aurousseau (1891–1983), Australian geographer, geologist, war hero, historian and translator
- Andrew Breeze (born 1954), English linguist
- William Bright (1928–2006), American linguist
- Richard Coates (born 1949), English linguist
- Joan Coromines (1905–1997), etymologist, dialectologist, toponymist
- Albert Dauzat (1877–1955), French linguist
- Eilert Ekwall (1877–1964, Sweden)
- Yoel Elitzur
- Henry Gannett (1846–1914), American geographer
- Margaret Gelling (1924–2009), English toponymist
- Michel Grosclaude (1926–2002), philosopher and French linguist
- Ernest Nègre (1907–2000), French toponymist
- W. F. H. Nicolaisen (1927–2016), folklorist, linguist, medievalist
- Oliver Padel (born 1948), English medievalist and toponymist
- Robert L. Ramsay (1880–1953), American linguist
- Adrian Room (1933–2010), British toponymist and onomastician
- Charles Rostaing (1904–1999), French linguist
- Henry Schoolcraft (1793–1864), American geographer, geologist and ethnologist
- Walter Skeat (1835–1912), British philologist
- Petar Skok (1881–1956), Croatian etymologist and toponymist
- Albert Hugh Smith (1903–1967), scholar of Old English and Scandinavian languages
- Frank Stenton (1880–1967), historian of Anglo-Saxon England
- George R. Stewart (1895–1980), American historian, toponymist and novelist
- Jan Paul Strid (1947–2018), Swedish toponymist
- Isaac Taylor (1829–1901), philologist, toponymist and Anglican canon of York
- James Hammond Trumbull (1821–1897), American scholar and philologist
- William J. Watson (1865–1948), Scottish scholar

== See also ==
=== Related concepts ===
- Anthroponymy
- Demonymy
- List of demonyms for U.S. states and territories
- Estate name
- Ethnonymy
- Endonym and exonym
- Gazetteer
- Lists of places

=== Toponymy ===
- Toponymic surname
- Planetary nomenclature

=== Hydronymy ===
- Latin names of European rivers
- Latin names of rivers
- List of river name etymologies
- Old European hydronymy

=== Regional toponymy ===
- Biblical toponyms in the United States
- Celtic toponymy
- German toponymy
- Germanic toponymy
- Historical African place names
- Japanese place names
- Korean toponymy and list of place names
- List of English exonyms for German toponyms
- List of Latin place names in Europe
- List of modern names for biblical place names
- List of renamed places in the United States
- List of U.S. place names connected to Sweden
- List of U.S. States and Territorial demonyms
- List of U.S. state name etymologies
- List of U.S. state nicknames
- Maghreb toponymy
- Names of European cities in different languages
- New Zealand place names
- Norman toponymy
- Oikonyms in Western and South Asia
- Place names of Palestine
  - Hebraization of Palestinian place names
- Place names in Sri Lanka
- Roman place names
- Toponyms of Finland
- Toponyms of Turkey
- Toponymy in the United Kingdom and Ireland
  - List of British places with Latin names
  - List of generic forms in place names in the British Isles
  - List of places in the United Kingdom
  - List of Roman place names in Britain
  - Place names in Irish
  - Welsh place names
  - Territorial designation
- Toponymy of the Kerguelen Islands

=== Other ===
- Labeling (map design)
- List of adjectival forms of place names
- List of double placenames
- List of long place names
- List of places named after peace
- List of places named after Lenin
- List of places named after Stalin
- List of places named for their main products
- List of political entities named after people
- List of short place names
- List of tautological place names
- List of words derived from toponyms
- Lists of things named after places
- List of geographic acronyms and initialisms
- List of geographic portmanteaus
- List of geographic anagrams and ananyms
- United Nations Group of Experts on Geographical Names
- UNGEGN Toponymic Guidelines

== Sources ==
- Room, Adrian (1996). An Alphabetical Guide to the Language of Name Studies. Lanham and London: The Scarecrow Press. ISBN 978-0-8108-3169-8.
