= List of Roman place names in Britain =

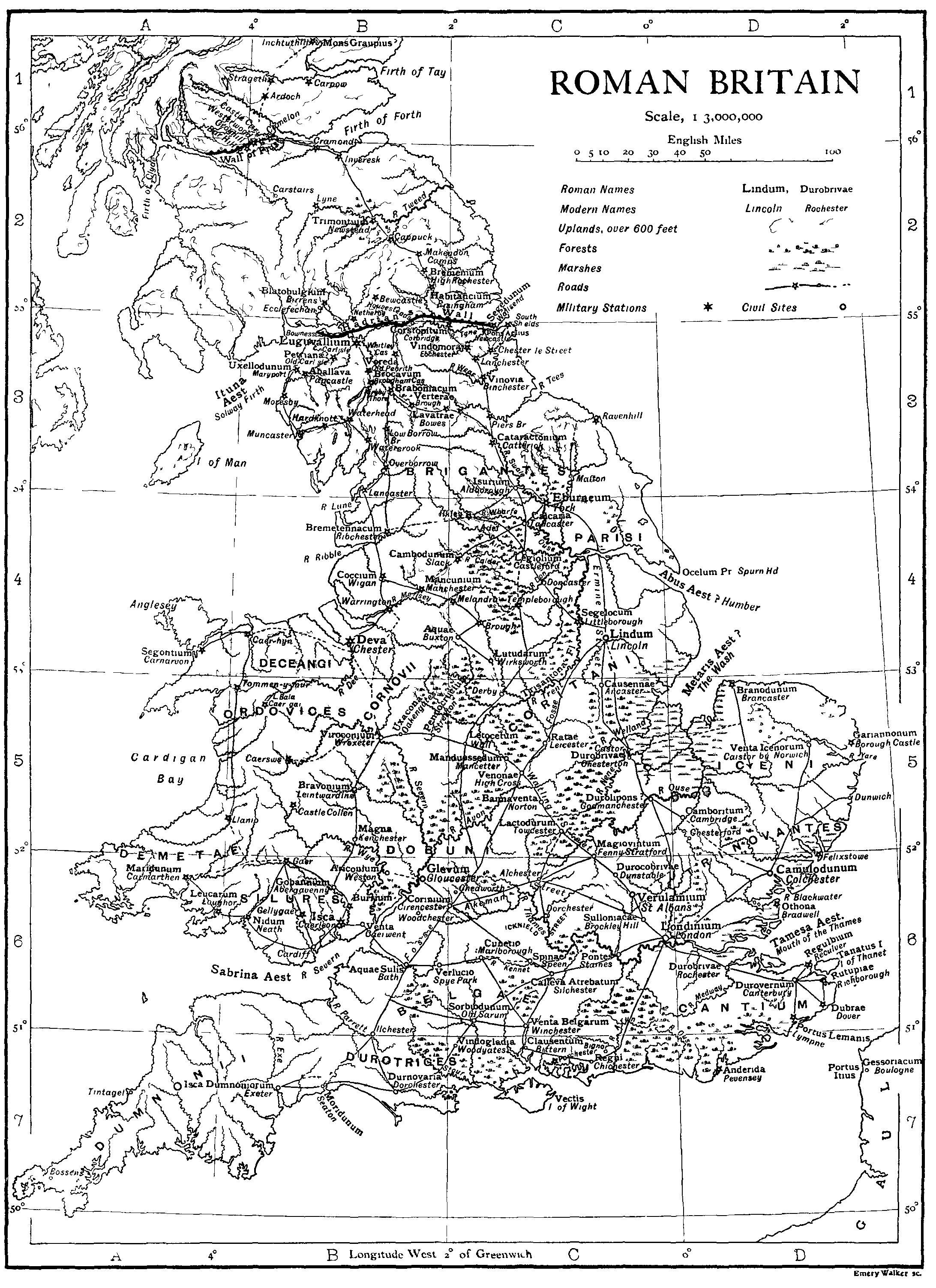
Roman Britain. Map from 1911 Encyclopædia Britannica

A partial list of Roman place names in Great Britain.

This list includes only names documented from Roman times. For a more complete list including later Latin names, see List of Latin place names in Britain.

The early sources for Roman names show numerous variants and misspellings of the Latin names. Moreover, Ptolemy, one of the principal authorities, wrote in Greek, so names that he records need to be transliterated back into Latin to reveal the original form.

Note that in general only one source is shown below for each name, although many of the names are recorded in more than one of the sources.

== Lists ==
=== Geographic regions ===
Roman name	Modern region	Appearance
Britannia	Great Britain	T
Hibernia	Ireland	T
Caledonia	Scotland	T

=== Settlement names ===
Roman name	Modern name	Appearances
Aballava	Burgh by Sands, Cumbria	ND, T
Ad Ansam	Unknown (Higham, Suffolk?)	AI
Ad Pontem	East Stoke, Nottinghamshire	AI
Ad Pontes or Pontibus	Staines-upon-Thames, Middlesex	AI
Aesica	Great Chesters, Northumberland	ND, T
Alaunodunum	Maidenhead, Berkshire	other
Alione or Alavana	Watercrook or Low Borrowbridge, Cumbria?	ND, AI
Alauna	Maryport, Cumbria	ND
Alaune	Alcester, Warwickshire	RC, T
Anderitum	Pevensey, East Sussex	ND, T
Aquae Arnemetiae	Buxton, Derbyshire	RC
Aquae Sulis	Bath, Somerset	AI, P
Arbeia	South Shields, Tyne & Wear	ND, T
Ardotalia	Gamesley, Glossop, Derbyshire	RC
Argistillum	Unknown (Tewkesbury, Gloucestershire?)	RC
Ariconium	Weston under Penyard, Herefordshire	AI
Banna	Birdoswald, Cumbria	ND
Bannavem Taburniae	unknown	SP
Bannaventa	Norton, near Daventry, Northamptonshire	AI
Belgic oppidum	Braintree, Essex	other
Blatobulgium	Birrens, Dumfriesshire	AI
Blestium	Monmouth	AI
Bomium	Cowbridge, South Glamorgan?	AI
Bovio	Tilston, Cheshire	AI
Branodunum	Brancaster, Norfolk	ND, T
Bravonium	Leintwardine, Herefordshire	AI
Bremenium	High Rochester, Northumberland	AI
Bremetennacum Veteranorum	Ribchester, Lancashire	AI, ND, RC, T
Brige	Ashley or Stockbrigde, Hampshire?	AI
Brocavum	Brougham, Cumbria	AI
Brocolitia or Procolitia	Carrawburgh, Northumberland	ND, T
Brovonacae or Bravoniacum	Kirkby Thore, Cumbria	AI, T
Burrium	Usk, Monmouthshire	AI
Caesaromagus	Chelmsford, Essex	AI, RC
Calcaria	Tadcaster, North Yorkshire	AI
Calleva Atrebatum	Silchester, Hampshire	AI, P, RC
Camboduno	unknown (Huddersfield?)	AI
Camboglanna	Castlesteads, Northumberland	RC, T
Camborico	Lackford or Hockwold, Norfolk	AI
Camulodunum	Colchester, Essex	AI, P, RC
Canonium	Kelvedon, Essex	AI
Caromago	Cramond, Edinburgh	RC
Castra Exploratorum	Netherby, Cumbria	AI
Cataractonium	Catterick, North Yorkshire	AI, P, RC
Causennis	Unknown (Sapperton, Lincolnshire?)	AI
Cilurnum	Walwick Chesters, Northumberland	ND, T
Clausentum	Bitterne, Hampshire	AI
Coccium	Wigan, Lancashire	AI
Colonia	Colchester, Essex	AI, RC
Conbretovium	Coddenham, Suffolk	AI
Concangis	Chester-le-Street, County Durham	ND, RC, T
Congavata or Coggabata	Drumburgh, Cumbria	ND, T
Condercum	Benwell, Newcastle upon Tyne	ND, T
Condate	Northwich, Cheshire	AI
Conovium	Caerhun, Clwyd	AI, RC
Corinium Dobunnorum	Cirencester, Gloucestershire	AI, P, RC
Coria or Corstopitum	Corbridge, Northumberland	AI, P, RC
Crocolana	Brough, Nottinghamshire	AI
Cunetione	Mildenhall, Wiltshire	AI
Curia	Traprain Law, East Lothian	P
Danum	Doncaster, South Yorkshire	AI, ND, T
Delgovicia or Devovicia	Malton, North Yorkshire	AI, RC
Deva Victrix	Chester	AI, P, RC
Derventione	Papcastle, Cumbria	ND, T
Derventio Brigantum	Stamford Bridge or Malton, Yorkshire	AI
Derventio Coritanorum	Little Chester, Derby	RC, T
Dictim	near Sunderland	ND, T
Dubris	Dover, Kent	AI, ND, RC, T
Durnovaria	Dorchester, Dorset	AI, RC
Durobrovis	Rochester, Kent	AI, RC
Durobrivae	Water Newton, Cambridgeshire	AI, RC
Durocobrivis	Dunstable, Bedfordshire	AI
Durocornovium	Swindon, Wiltshire	AI
Durolevum	Unknown (Ospringe or Sittingbourne?)	AI
Durolipons	Cambridge	AI, RC
Durolitum	Little London, Essex	AI
Durovernum Cantiacorum	Canterbury	AI, RC
Durovigutum	Godmanchester	RC
Eboracum	York	AI, P, RC
Evidensca	East Lothian	RC
Gabrosentum	Unknown (Moresby, Cumbria or Gateshead?)	ND, T
Galacum	Burrow-in-Lonsdale?	AI
Galava	Ambleside, Cumbria	AI
Garrianonum	Burgh Castle, Norfolk or Caister-on-Sea, Norfolk	ND, T
Glannoventa or Cantiventi	Ravenglass, Cumbria	AI, ND, RC, T
Glevum Colonia	Gloucester	AI, RC
Gobannium	Abergavenny, Monmouthshire	AI, RC
Hortonium	Halifax, West Yorkshire	other
Isca Dumnoniorum	Exeter, Devon	AI, P, RC
Isca Augusta	Caerleon, Gwent	AI
Isannavantia	Norton, Northamptonshire	AI
Isurium or Isubrigantum	Aldborough, North Yorkshire	AI, P
Lactodorum	Towcester, Northamptonshire	AI, RC
Lagentium or Legeolio	Castleford, West Yorkshire	AI, RC
Lavatris	Bowes Castle, County Durham	AI, ND, RC, T
Leodis or Loidis	Leeds	other
Leucarum	Loughor, Swansea	AI
Letocetum or Etoceto	Wall, Staffordshire	AI
Lindinis	Ilchester, Somerset	P, RC
Lindum Colonia	Lincoln	AI, P
Londinium	London	AI, P
Longovicium	Lanchester, County Durham	ND, RC, T
Luentinum	Pumsaint/Dolaucothi	P
Luguvalium	Carlisle, Cumbria	AI, RC
Lutudarum	Wirksworth or Carsington, Derbyshire	RC
Magiovinto	Fenny Stratford, Buckinghamshire	AI
Magis	near Workington, Cumbria	ND, T
Magnis	Kenchester, Herefordshire	AI, ND, RC, T
Maglona	Wigton, Cumbria	ND, T
Magnus Portus	Bosham, Sussex	P
Manduesedum	Mancetter, Warwickshire	AI
Mamucium or Mantio	Manchester	AI, RC
Maromago	Midlothian	RC
Margidunum	Bingham, Nottinghamshire	AI
Mediolanum	Whitchurch, Shropshire	AI, P, RC
Morbium	Piercebridge, County Durham	ND, T
Moridunum	Axminster, Devon	AI
Moridunum	Carmarthen	P
Navio or Anovius	Brough-on-Noe, Hope Valley, Derbyshire	RC
Nidum	Neath, West Glamorgan	AI
Noviomagus Reginorum	Chichester, Sussex	AI, P, RC
Noviomagus Cantiacorum	West Wickham, formerly supposed to be Crayford, both in the historic county of Kent	AI
Olenacum	unknown (Elslack, North Yorkshire?)	ND, T
Olicana	Ilkley, West Yorkshire	P
Onnum or Hunnum	Halton, Northumberland	ND, T
Othona	Bradwell-on-Sea, Essex	ND, T
Pennocrucium	Water Eaton, Staffordshire	AI
Petriana	Stanwix in Carlisle, Cumbria	ND, T
Petuaria	Brough, Yorkshire	P, RC
Pons Aelius	Newcastle upon Tyne	ND, T
Portus Abonae	Sea Mills, Bristol	AI
Portus Adurni	Portchester, Hampshire	ND, RC, T
Portus Felix	Filey, North Yorkshire	other
Portus Lemanis	Lympne, Kent	AI, ND, T
Praesidium	unknown (Newton Kyme, North Yorkshire?)	ND, T
Praetorium	unknown (Bridlington?)	AI
Ratae Corieltauvorum	Leicester	AI, P
Regulbium	Reculver, Kent	ND, T
Rutunium	Harcourt Park, Shropshire	AI
Rutupiae	Richborough, Kent	AI, ND, P, T
Salinae	Middlewich, Cheshire	RC
Segedunum	Wallsend, Tyne and Wear	ND, T
Segelocum or Agelocum	Littleborough, Nottinghamshire	AI
Segontium	Caernarfon	AI, RC
Sitomagus, Sitomagum, Sitomago, or Senomagus	Unknown, possibly Ixworth, Suffolk	AI
Sorbiodonum	Salisbury, Wiltshire	AI, RC
Spinae	Speen, Berkshire	AI
Sulloniacae	unknown (Brockley Hill?)	AI
Trajectus	Keynsham, Somerset	AI
Trimontium	Newstead, Scottish Borders	P
Tripontium	Churchover, Warwickshire	AI
Uxacona	Redhill, Shropshire	AI
Uxelodunum or Axelodunum	Bowness-on-Solway, Cumbria	ND, RC, T
Vagniacae	Springhead, Kent	AI
Varae	St Asaph, Denbighshire?	AI
Vectis	Isle of Wight	P
Venonae	High Cross, Leicestershire	AI
Venta Belgarum	Winchester, Hampshire	AI, P, RC
Venta Icenorum or Icinos	Caistor St Edmund, Norfolk	AI, P, RC
Venta Silurum	Caerwent, Monmouthshire	AI, RC
Vercovicium or Borcovicium	Housesteads, Northumberland	ND, T
Verlucione	Sandy Lane, Wiltshire	AI
Verterae or Verteris	Brough, Cumbria	AI, ND, T
Vertis	Unknown (Worcester?)	RC
Verulamium	St Albans, Hertfordshire	AI, P, RC, T
Verometum or Vernometum	Willoughby on the Wolds, Nottinghamshire	AI
Vindobala	Rudchester, Northumberland	ND, T
Vindocladia	Shapwick, Dorset	AI, RC
Vindolanda	Chesterholme, Northumberland	RC, T
Vindomis	Neatham, Hampshire	AI, RC
Vindomora	Ebchester, County Durham	AI
Vinovia	Binchester, County Durham	AI, P, RC
Viroconium Cornoviorum	Wroxeter, Shropshire	AI, RC
Virosidum	Bainbridge, North Yorkshire	ND, T
Voreda	Penrith, Cumbria	AI, RC

== See also ==
- List of Latin place names in Britain
- List of Latin place names in Continental Europe and Ireland
- Latin names of regions
- Latin names of European countries
- History of Britain
- History of Ireland
- Roman sites in the United Kingdom
- United Nations Group of Experts on Geographical Names

== Primary sources ==
1. AI: The Antonine Itinerary
2. P: Ptolemy's Geography
3. RC: The Ravenna Cosmography
4. T: Tacitus's On the Life and Character of Julius Agricola.
5. SP: Confession of St. Patrick
6. ND: Notitia Dignitatum
