= Names of European cities in different languages (A) =

Different names for European cities in neighbouring languages

The names used for some major European cities differ in different European and sometimes non-European languages. In some countries where there are two or more languages spoken, such as Belgium or Switzerland, dual forms may be used within the city itself, for example on signage. This is also the case in Ireland, despite a low level of actual usage of the Irish language. In other cases where a regional language is officially recognised, that form of the name may be used in the region, but not nationally. Examples include the Welsh language in Wales in the United Kingdom, and parts of Italy and Spain.

There is a slow trend to return to the local name, which has been going on for a long time. In English Livorno is now used, the old English form of Leghorn having become antiquated at least a century ago. In some cases, such as the replacement of Danzig with Gdańsk, the official name has been changed more recently. Since 1995, the government of Ukraine has encouraged the use of Kyiv rather than Kiev.

English name	Other names or former names
(Denmark) Aabenraa	Aabenraa or Åbenrå (Danish*), Āběnlā – 阿本拉 (Mandarin Chinese), Abenra (Kabyle*), Åbenrå (Norwegian*), Åbenrå (Swedish*), Abenra – Абенра (Macedonian), Affenråe or Affenrå (South Jutlandic), Àoběnluó – 奥本罗 (Simplified Chinese*), Àoběnluó – 奧本羅 (Traditional Chinese), Appenrade (French*), Ōbenrō – オーベンロー (Japanese*), Oben-ro – 오벤로 (Korean*), Obenro (Lithuanian*), Obenro (Azerbaijani*), Obenro – Обенро (Serbian*), Obenró – Обенро́ (Ukrainian*), Apenrade (German)
(Germany) Aachen	Aachen (Alemannisch*, Bavarian*, Bosnian*, Croatian*, Danish*, Estonian*, Finnish*, German*, Hungarian*, Icelandic*, Ido*, Indonesian*, Interlingue*, Irish*, Kurmanji Kurdish*, Norwegian Bokmål*, Norwegian Nynorsk*, Northern Frisian*, Quechua*, Romanian*, Saterland Frisian*, Scots*, Scottish Gaelic*, Serbo-Croatian*, Silesian*, Slovak*, Slovene*, Swedish*, Turkish*, Upper Sorbian*, Volapük*, Welsh*, Zaza*), Aac'hen (Breton*), Ahen – Ахен (Chechen*, Macedonian*, Serbian*, Tatar*, Kazakh*), Oche or Óche (Aachen dialect*, Ripuarian, Colognian*), Achen (Kashubian*), Aken (Dutch*, Low German*, West Frisian*, Zeelandic*), Cáchy (Czech*, old Slovak*), Aix-la-Chapelle (traditional English, French*), Āḵan – آخن (Arabic*, Persian*), Aquisgrana (Corsican*, Italian*, Lombard*, Sicilian*), Akhen – Ախեն or Aakhen – Աախեն (Armenian), Aaxen (Azerbaijani*), Akisgran (Basque*), Áchien – А́хен (Belarusian*), Àhen – А̀хен (Bulgarian*), Aquisgrà (Catalan*), Āhēn – 阿很 or Yàchēn – 亞琛 / 亚琛 (Chinese*), Akeno or Aĥeno (Esperanto*), Aakheni – აახენი (Georgian*), Áachen – Άαχεν (Greek*), Akyísgranon – Ακυίσγρανον (Greek Katharevousa), Oakens (Gronings), Aachen – אאכן (Hebrew*), Aachen or Aquisgrano (Interlingua*), Āhen – アーヘン (Japanese*), Ahen – 아헨 (Korean*), Aquæ Granni, Aquisgrana, Aquis Granum, Aquisgranum or Urbs Aquensis (Latin*), Āhene (Latvian*), Achenas (Lithuanian*), Aoke (Limburgish*), Oochen (Luxembourgish*), Aquisgran, Aisgran or Ais d'Alemanha (Occitan*), Takn (Old Norse), А́hen – А́хен (Ossetic*), Akwizgran (Polish*), Aquisgrano or Aquisgrão (Portuguese*), Áhen – А́хен (Russian*), Aquisgrán (Aragonese*, Asturian*, Galician*, Spanish*), `ākhen – อาเค่น (Thai*), Aáhen – Аа́хен (Ukrainian*), Åxhe (Walloon*)
(Denmark) Aalborg	Aalborg (Danish*, German, Dutch, Norwegian*, Spanish), Álaborg (Icelandic*), Alborg – Алборг (Serbian*), Olbor – Олбор (Bulgarian*), Ålborg (Swedish*), Oalbörg (Gronings), Olborga (Latvian*), Olborgas (Lithuanian*), Olborgi – ოლბორგი (Georgian*), Ōrubō – オールボー (Japanese*), Olboreu – 올보르 (Korean*), Àobǎo – 奥堡 (Mandarin)
(Belgium) Aalst	Aals (Limburgish*), Aalst (Dutch*), Åch (Walloon*), Aelst (Zeelandic*), Alost (French*, Spanish*), Alósti – Αλόστη (Greek), Alostum (Latin*) Àosītè – 奥斯特 (Mandarin*), Alst (Azerbaijani*), Alst – Алст (Macedonian, Serbian*), Ālsta (Latvian*), Alstas (Lithuanian*), Oilsjt (South Brabantian, used during Carnival*), Oalst (West Flemish*)
(Denmark) Aarhus	Aarhaus or Arenhusen (former German*), Aarhus (Danish*, Dutch*, Hungarian*, Norwegian*), Àoěrhúsī – 奥尔胡斯/奧爾胡斯 (Chinese*), Århus (alternative Danish, Finnish*, German*, Swedish*), Aros or Aarhusium (Latin*), Árósar (Icelandic*), Oarhoes (Gronings), Ōfusu – オーフス (Japanese*), Órchous – Ώρχους (Greek), Oreuhuseu / Orŭhusŭ – 오르후스 (Korean*), Orhus (Lithuanian*, Turkish), Orhus – Орхус (Bulgarian*, Macedonian, Russian, Serbian*), Orhūsa (Latvian*), Orhusi – ორჰუსი (Georgian*)
(Netherlands) Aardenburg	Aardenburg (Dutch*), Aerdenbourg (French*), Eirdnburg (West Flemish*), Erreburg (Zeelandic*)
(Belgium) Aarschot	Aarschot (Dutch*), Aerschot (French*), Arschotum (Latin), Arsxot (Azerbaijani*), Oarschot (Walloon)
(France) Abbeville	Abavila (archaic Portuguese), Abbatis Villa (Latin), Abbeville (French*, Dutch*, German, Romanian*), Abevil – Абевил (Serbian*), Abvil' – Абвиль (Russian*), Abvil – Абвил (Macedonian), Abvil (Turkish), Advile (Picard*), Ābócūn – 阿伯村 (Mandarin), Abbekerke (West Flemish*)
(United Kingdom) (Scotland) Aberdeen	Aberdea, Aberdona, Aberdonia*, Aberdonium, Aberdonum, Abredonia, Devana, Devanha or Verniconam (Latin*), Aberdin – Абердин (Russian*, Macedonian*, Serbian*), Aberdin (Turkish), Ābódīng – 阿伯丁 or Yàbódīng – 亚伯丁/亞伯丁 (Chinese*), Abadīn – アバディーン (Japanese*), Aiberdeen (Scots*), Obar Deathain (Irish), Obar Dheathain (Scottish Gaelic*)
(Romania) Adjud	Adjud (Romanian*), Egyedhalma (Hungarian), Adžud – Аџуд (Macedonian, Serbian)
(Romania) Aiud	Aiud (Romanian*), Ajud – Ајуд (Macedonian, Serbian*), Nagyenyed (Hungarian*), Straßburg am Mieresch (German*)
(France) Aix-en-Provence	Aikso Provenca (Esperanto*), Ais (Provençal), Ais de Provença (Catalan*, Occitan*, Portuguese*), Aix-en-Provence (Dutch*, French*, Romanian*, Finnish*), Aquae Sextiae (Latin*), Eksangpeurobangseu / Eksangp'ŭrobangsŭ – 엑상프로방스 (Korean*), Eks-an-Provans – Экс-ан-Прованс (Russian*), Eks an Provans – Екс ан Прованс (Serbian*), Eks-an-Provans (Turkish), Pǔluówàngsī de Āikèsí – 普罗旺斯的艾克斯/普羅旺斯的艾克斯 (Mandarin)
(France) Aix-les-Bains	Aix-les-Bains (Dutch*, French*, Finnish*), Aquae Allobrogum, Aquae Gratianae or Aquae Sabaudiae (Latin*), Eks le Ben – Екс ле Бен (Serbian*), Ekusureban – エクスレバン (Japanese), Èx-los-Bens (Franco-Provençal*)
(France) Ajaccio	Aiacciu (Corsican*), Aghjacciu (local Corsican name), Aiákio – Αιάκειο (Greek), Ajaccio (Catalan cs:Ajaccio, Dutch*, French*, Finnish*, Italian*, Spanish*), Ajácio (Portuguese*), Ajačio – Ајачио or Ažaksio – Ажаксио (Macedonian), Ajačo – Ајачо (Serbian*), Ajaksio – 아작시오 or Ayacho / Ayach'o – 아야초 (Korean*), Ajakushio – アジャクシオ (Japanese*), Ayachcho – Аяччо (Russian*), Āyǎkèxiāo – 阿雅克肖 (Chinese*), Ayaçço (Turkish), Adiacium (Latin*)
(Slovenia) Ajdovščina	Castra ad Fluvium Frigidum (Latin), Aidussina (Italian), Ajdovščina (Slovene*), Ajdovščina – Ајдовшчина (Serbian*), Haidenschaft (German)
(Romania) Alba Iulia	Alba Iulia (Romanian*), Alba-Julia (French), Alba Júlia (Portuguese*), Alba Julija – Алба Јулија (Serbian*, Macedonian), Apulon (Dacian*), Apulum or Alba Iulia (Latin*), Bălgrad (former name*), Erdel Belgradı (Ottoman Turkish), Gyulafehérvár (Hungarian*), Karlsburg or Weißenburg (German*), Àobā Yóulìyà - 奥巴尤利娅/奧巴尤莉雅 (Mandarin)
(Spain) Albacete	Albacete (Dutch, Indonesian, Finnish, German, Spanish*), Albacète (French), al-Basīt – البسيط (Arabic*), Albaset – Албасет (Macedonian), Albasete – Альбасете (Russian*), Albasete – Албасете (Serbian*), Arubasete – アルバセテ (Japanese*)
(Greece) Alexandroupolis	Alejandrópolis (Spanish), Alexandhroúpolis – Αλεξανδρούπολις (Greek Katharevousa), Aleksandropolis (Finnish), Aleksandrupolis (Lithuanian), Aleksandrupolis – Александруполис (Macedonian, Russian, Serbian*), Aleksandrupolis – Александруполіс (Ukrainian*), Alessandropoli (Italian), Alexandropolis (Latin*), Alexandrópolis (Portuguese*), Alexandhroúpoli – Αλεξανδρούπολη (Greek*), Alexandrúpoli (Catalan), Dedeağaç (Turkish*), Dedeagatch (former name*), Dedeagh (former French*), Yàlìkèshāndéluóbólìsī/Āléikésāndélǔpōulìsī - 亚历克山德罗波利斯/阿雷克三德鲁剖利斯 (Mandarin), Dedeagach - Дедеагач (Bulgarian*)
(Spain) Algeciras	Al-Jazirah Al-Khadra (Arabic*), Algeciras (Dutch, Finnish*, German, Spanish*), Algesiras (Lithuanian), Algésiras (French*), Algesires (Catalan*), Alhesiras – Алхесирас (Macedonian, Serbian*), Al'khesiras – Альхесирас (Russian*), Àohéxīlāsī - 奥和西拉斯 (Mandarin), Iulia Traducta (Latin)
(Italy) Alghero	Algero – Алгеро (Macedonian, Serbian*), Alghero (Finnish*, Italian*), Alĝiro (Esperanto), Algueiro (Portuguese, rare*), Alguer (Spanish*), Alguero (Ladino*), L'Alguer (Algherese dialect*, Catalan*, Gallego*, Occitan*), L'Aliera (Sassarese language*), S'Alighèra (Sardinian*)
(Spain) Alicante	Ákra Leuká – Ἄκρα Λευκά, Ákra Leukḗ – Ἄκρα Λευκὴ or Leukḕ Ákra – Λευκὴ Ἄκρα*, Loukéntoi – Λουκέντοι or Loúkenton – Λούκεντον (Ancient Greek*), al-Laqant – اللقنت (Arabic*), Alacant (Catalan*), Alakanto (Esperanto*), Alicante (Dutch*, Finnish*, French*, German*, Portuguese*, Romanian*, Spanish*), Alikánte – Αλικάντε or Alakánt – Αλακάντ (Modern Greek*), Alikante (Ladino*, Latvian*), Alikantė (Lithuanian*), Alikante – Аликанте (Macedonian, Russian*, Serbian*), Lucentum (Latin*), Ālìkǎntè - 阿利坎特 (Mandarin)
(Netherlands) Alkmaar	Alcmære (Anglo-Saxon*), Alcmaria (Latin*), Alkmaar (Dutch*), Alkmar (Azerbaijani*, Western Frisian*), Alkmāra (Latvian*), Alkmaras (Lithuanian*)
(Netherlands) Almelo	Almelas (Lithuanian*), Almelo (Dutch*)
(Spain) Almería	al-Mariyya (Arabic), Almeria (Catalan, Portuguese*), Almería (Spanish), Almeria (Portuguese), Almerija – Алмерија (Serbian*), Al'meriya – Альмерия (Russian*), Portus Magnus (Latin), Ā'ōuméilìyà - 阿欧梅利亚 (Mandarin)
(Lithuania) Alytus	Alita - Аліта (Belarusian), Alīta (Latvian), Alite (Yiddish), Alitten (German*), Alitus – Алитус (Serbian*), Alit'usi – ალიტუსი (Georgian*), Allituseu / Allit'usŭ – 알리투스 (Korean*), Olita (Polish), Olita – Олита (Russian)
(Netherlands) Amersfoort	Amersfoart (Western Frisian*), Amersfoort (Dutch*), Amersforta (Latvian*), Amersfortas (Lithuanian*), Amersforto (Esperanto*), Amesfoort (Low Saxon*)
(Netherlands) Amsterdam	Amestelledamme, Aemstelredamme or Amstelredam (former Dutch), Amseutereudam / Amsŭt'erŭdam – 암스테르담 (Korean*), Amstardam (Irish), Amstardām – أمستردام (Arabic*), Amstelodamum (Latin*), Amstelodhámon – Αμστελόδαμον (Greek Katharevousa), Amsterdam (Azeri*, Catalan*, Croatian*, Dutch*, Estonian*, Finnish*, French*, German, Indonesian*, Italian*, Limburgish*, Maltese, Polish*, Romanian*, Scottish Gaelic*, Swedish*, Tagalog*, Turkish*, West Frisian*) Amsterdam – Амстердам (Bulgarian*, Macedonian, Russian*, Serbian*, Ukrainian*), Amsterdam – אמסטרדם (Hebrew*), Ámsterdam (Spanish*), Ámsterdam – Άμστερνταμ (Greek*), Amsterdam – אַמסטערדאַם (Yiddish*), Amsterdama (Latvian*), Amsterdamas (Lithuanian*), Amstèrdame (Arpitan*), Amsterdamo (Esperanto*), Âmesterdâm – آمستردام (Persian), Amsterdão, Amsterdã or Amesterdão (Portuguese*), Amsterodam (Czech*), Amstyerdam – Амстэрдам (Belarusian*), Amst'erdami – ამსტერდამი (Georgian*), Amszterdam (Hungarian*), Āmǔsītèdān – 阿姆斯特丹 (Chinese*), Amusuterudamu – アムステルダム (Japanese*), Mokum or Mokum Aleph or Groot-Mokum (Yiddish, informal*)
(Italy) Ancona	Ancona (Croatian, Dutch, German, Italian, Latin), Ancône (French*), Ānkēnà – 安科納/安科纳 (Chinese*), Ankóna – Αγκώνα (Greek), Ankōna – アンコーナ (Japanese*), Ankona / Ank'ona – 안코나 (Korean*), Ankona (Maltese, Polish*), Ankona – Анкона (Russian*, Serbian*), Jakin (older Croatian*)
(Belgium) Andenne	Andenas (Lithuanian*), Andenna (Latin), Andene (Walloon*), Andenne (French*)
Andorra la Vella	Andora (Polish*, Silesian*), Andòra a Vella (Ligurian*), Andora la Velja (Latvian*, Lithuanian*), Andora Tua (Betawi*), Andorr la Vel'j (Veps*), Andorra-a-Velha (Portuguese*), Andorra la Velja (Talysh*), Andorra la Vieja (Spanish*, Tagalog*), Andòrra la Vièlha (Occitan*), Andorra la Viella (Aragonese*), Andorra-la-Vielye (Arpitan*), Andorra la Vieya (Asturian*), Andorra sa Vella (Sardinian*), Andorra Tuan (Tetum*), Andorra Vetus (Latin*), Andorre-la-Vieille (French*), Andoro Malnova (Esperanto*), Anduora (Samotigian*), Eandorreburg (Old English*)
(France) Angers	Andecāvis/Juliomagus (Latin), Angers (French*), Angieus (Occitan), Añje (Breton*)
(Germany) Anklam	Anclam (former German spelling*), Anklam (German*), Anklam – Анклам (Macedonian, Serbian), Nakło nad Pianą (Polish*), Tanglim or Wendenburg (older German*)
(Belgium) Antoing	Antoing (French*), Antonium (Latin), Antweon (Picard*) Antwon (Walloon*)
(Belgium) Ans	Ans (French*), Ansa (Latvian), Anse (Walloon*)
(Belgium) Antwerp	Amberes (Spanish*), Amvérsa – Αμβέρσα (Greek), Anteubereupeon / Ant'ŭberŭp'ŏn – 안트베르펀 (Korean*), Āntèwèipǔ – 安特衛普/安特卫普 (Chinese*), Antorf (former German*), Antowāpu – アントワープ (Japanese*), Antuairp (Irish), Antuérpia (Portuguese*), Antverpen – Антверпен (Macedonian, Russian*, Serbian*, Ukrainian*), Antverpen – אנטוורפן (Hebrew), Antverpenas (Lithuanian), Antverpene (Latvian), Antverpeno (Esperanto*), Antverpy (Czech, Slovak), Antwaarp (Gronings), Antwerpe (neighbouring dialect, Limburgish), Antwerpen (Croatian*, Dutch*, Estonian*, Finnish*, German*, Hungarian*, Norwegian*, Swedish*), Antwerpia (Polish*), Antwīrb (Arabic), Antƿerpen (Anglo-Saxon*), Anveres (Ladino), Anvers (French*, Catalan*, Romanian*, Turkish*), Anversa (Italian*), Anviesse (Walloon)
(Italy) Aosta	Aosta (Italian*), Aoste* (French), Aoûta (Arpitan), Augschtal (Walser German), Ohta (Variant Arpitan*), Osta (Piedmontese*), Osten (German, obsolete), Augusta Praetoria Salassorum (Latin*), Veulla (Variant Arpitan*)
(Netherlands) Appingedam	Apingedamas (Lithuanian), Appingedam (Dutch*), n Daam (Low Saxon*)
(Italy) Aquileia	Ākuíláiyà – 阿奎萊亞/阿奎莱亚 (Chinese*), Akvileja – Аквилеја (Macedonian, Serbian*), Akvilia (Finnish), Akwileja (Polish*), Akyliía – Ακυληία or Akouiliía – Ακουιληία (Greek*), Aquilea (Spanish), Aquileia (Italian*, Portuguese*, Catalan, Romanian), Aquilea, Aquileia, Aglar(-n) or Agley (German*), Aquilée (French*), Aquilee (Friulian*), Aquiłeja (Venetian*), Oglej (Slovene*)
(Sweden) Åre	Ååre (Southern Sami), Åre (Swedish), Orė (Lithuanian)
(Sweden) Arjeplog	Aarjepluevie (Southern Sami), Árjapluovve (Pite Sami alternate), Árjeluovve (Pite Sami alternate), Arjeplog (Swedish), Árjepluovve (Lule Sami, Pite Sami), Árjepluovvi (Northern Sami), Árjiepluövvie (Ume Sami)
(Russia) Arkhangelsk	Arcangel (Portuguese*), Arcangelo (Italian*), Archandělsk (Czech*), Archangel (former English), Archángelos – Αρχάγγελος (Greek*), Arkhànguelsk (Catalan), Arcàngel (old Catalan), Archangelsk (Dutch*, German*), Archangelsk – ארחנגלסק (Hebrew*), Archangelskas (Lithuanian*), Archangeľsk (Slovak*), Archangielsk (Polish*), Areuhangelseukeu / Arŭhan'gelsŭk'ŭ – 아르한겔스크 (Korean*), Arhangelsk (Croatian*, Estonian*), Arhangelsk – Архангелск (Macedonian*, Serbian*), Arhangeļska (Latvian*), Arhangelszk (Hungarian), Āěrhàngéěrsīkè – 阿爾漢格爾斯克/阿尔汉格尔斯克 (Chinese, phonetic*), Dàtiānshǐ - 大天使 (Mandarin, lit.), Arhanghelsk (Romanian*, Turkish*), Arjángelsk (Spanish*), Arkángel (variant in Spanish*), Arkangeli (Finnish*), Arkangelsko (Esperanto*), Arkhangel (French*), Arkhangel'sk – Архангельск (Russian*), Arxangelsk (Azeri*), Sint-Michiel (Dutch, antiquated*)
(Belgium) Arlon	Aarle (Limburgish*), Aarlen (Dutch*), Aerlen (Zeelandic*), Arel (German*, Luxembourgish*), Arlona (Latvian*) Arlonas (Lithuanian*), Arlon (French*, Finnish*), Arlon – Арлон (Macedonian*, Russian*, Serbian*), Årlon (Walloon*), Oarlen (West Flemish*), Orolaunum Vicus (Latin*)
(Netherlands) Arnemuiden	Arnemuiden (Dutch*), Arnemeidenas (Lithuanian), Erremu (Zeelandic*)
(Netherlands) Arnhem	Ānàmǔ – 阿納姆/阿纳姆 (Chinese*), Arecanum (Latin*), Arnheim (Alemannic, German*), Arnhem Dutch*), Arnema (Latvian*), Arnhemas (Lithuanian*), Arnhem – Арнхем (Macedonian*), Ārnhema (Latvian*), Arnhim (West Frisian*), Arnem (Azerbaijani*, Low German*, Low Saxon*, Uzbek*), Arnem – Арнем (Serbian*), Èrnem (Ernems)
(France) Arras	Aras – Арас (Macedonian*, Serbian*), Arasu – アラス (Japanese*), Arazzo (medieval Italian*), Arracht (Gronings), Arràs (Catalan), Arras (French*, German*, Italian*, Portuguese*, Romanian*, Swedish*), Atrecht (Dutch*), Āhā – 阿哈 (Mandarin), Aros (Picard*)
(Sweden) Arvidsjaur	Aerviesjaevrie (Southern Sami), Árvehávvre (Pite Sami), Árvesjávri (Northern Sami), Árvesjávrre (Lule Sami), Arvidsjaur (Swedish*), Árviesjávrrie (Ume Sami)
(Germany) Aschaffenburg	Ašafenburg – Ашафенбург (Macedonian*, Serbian), Aschaffenbourg (French*), Aschaffenburg (Dutch*, German*, Catalan), Aschaffenburgo (Spanish*), Āshāfēnbǎo - 阿莎芬堡 (Mandarin), Aschaffenburgum (Latin*)
(Sweden) Åsele	Åsele (Swedish), Sjeltie (Southern Sami)
(Netherlands) Asperen	Asperen (Dutch*), Caspingium (Latin)
(Netherlands) Assen	Asena (Latvian*), Asenas (Lithuanian*), Assen (Dutch*, Low Saxon*)
(Italy) Assisi	Ascesi (Central Italian*), Asís (Spanish*), Āxīxī – 阿西西 or Yàxīxī – 亞西西 (Chinese*), Asisi – 아시시 (Korean*), Asisi (Romanian*), Asisi – Асиси (Macedonian*), Asizi – Асизи (Serbian*), Asizo (Esperanto*), Assis (Portuguese*), Assís (Catalan), Assise (French*), Assisien (older German*), Assisië (older Dutch*), Assisi (Dutch*, Italian*, Maltese), Assízi – Ασσίζη (Greek*), Assizi – Ассизи (Russian*), Asyż (Polish*), Asisium (Latin*)
(Russia) Astrakhan	an Astracáin (Irish), Aseuteurahan / Asŭt'ŭrahan – 아스트라한 (Korean*), Ästerxan (Tatar*), Astracã (Portuguese*), Astracanum (Latin*), Astrachan (Dutch*, German*), Astrachań (Polish*), Astrachán (Slovak*), Astrachán – Αστραχάν (Greek*), Astrahan (Croatian*, Estonian*, Finnish*, Turkish*), Astrahan – Астрахан (Serbian*), Astraĥano (Esperanto*), Astraján or Astracán (Spanish*), Astrakhan (French*, Italian*), Astrakhan – Астрахань (Russian*), Âstrâkhân – آستراخان (Persian), Asutorahan – アストラハン (Japanese*), Asztrahány (Hungarian*), Hâjitarkhân – حاجیترخان (former Persian), Həştərxan (Azeri*), Xacitarxan (former Tatar), Āsītèlāhǎn – 阿斯特拉罕 (Chinese*)
(Belgium) Ath	Aat (Dutch*, Limburgish*), Aet (Zeelandic*) Ât (Picard*), Atas (Lithuanian), Ate (Walloon*), Ath (French*), Athum (Latin*)
(Greece) Athens	Afina (Azeri*), Afiny – Афины (Russian*), Afiny – Афіни or (old form) Ateny – Атени ((Ukrainian*)), An Aithin (Irish*), An Àithne (Scottish Gaelic*), Ateena (Estonian*, Finnish*), Aten (Norwegian*, Swedish*), Aten – אַטען (Yiddish*), Atena (Croatian*, Indonesian*, Romanian*), Atėnai (Lithuanian*), Atenas (Ladino, Portuguese*, Spanish*, Tagalog*), Atēnas (Latvian*), Atene (Frisian*, Italian*, Slovene*), Atene – アテネ (Japanese*), Atene / At'ene – 아테네 (Korean*), Atenes (Catalan*), Atênes (Arpitan*), Ateni – ათენი (Georgian*), Ateni (Maltese), Atenk – Աթենք (Armenian*), Ateno (Esperanto*), Ateny (Polish*), Atény (Czech*, Slovak*), Athen (Danish*, German*, Norwegian*, Welsh*), Athén (Hungarian*), Atena (Icelandic, rare*), Athenae (Latin*), Athḗnai – Ἀθῆναι (Ancient Greek), Athene (Dutch*, Limburgish*), Athènes (French*), Athény (alternate Czech*), Athína – Αθήνα (Greek*), Athíne – Ἀθῆναι (Greek Katharevousa), Atīnā (Arabic), Atina – Атина (Bulgarian*, Macedonian*, Serbian*), Atina (Turkish*), Atinci – Атинци (Bulgarian alternate name), Atuna – אתונה (Hebrew*), Aþena (Icelandic*), Cetines (Old Catalan), Yǎdiǎn – 雅典 (Chinese, simplified*)
(Republic of Ireland) Athlone	Baile Átha Luain (Irish*), Atlon – Атлон (Serbian*), Atlona (Latin*)
(Belgium) Aubange	Åbindje (Walloon*), Aubange (French*), Éibeng (Luxembourgish*), Ibingen (German*), Obanža (Latvian)
(Germany) Augsburg	Ágosta (old Hungarian), Ágsborg (Icelandic*), Àogésībǎo – 奧格斯堡 (Chinese*), Áougsbourg – Άουγκσμπουργκ (Greek*), Augsbourg (French*), Augsburg (Dutch*, German*, Finnish*, Hungarian, Polish*, Catalan*, Romanian*, Turkish*), Augsburg – Аугсбург (Macedonian*, Russian*), Augsburg – אוגסבורג (Hebrew*), Augsburga (Latvian*), Augsburgi – აუგსბურგი (Georgian*), Augsburgo (Portuguese*, Spanish*), Aŭgsburgo (Esperanto*), Augšpurk or Aušpurk (Czech*), Augzburg – Аугзбург (Serbian*), Augusta (Italian*), Augusta Vindelicorum (Latin*), Aukusuburuku – アウクスブルク (Japanese*), Avgústa – Αυγούστα (alternate Greek*), Oogsborg (Low Saxon), Ougschburg (Swabian)
(Germany) Aurich	Aurich (German), Auerk (East Frisian, Low German), Aurich – אאוריך (Hebrew), Aurih – Аурих (Serbian*), Auwerk (Gronings, West Frisian), Aurk (Saterlandic)
(Ukraine) Avdiivka	Avdeyevka – Авде́евка (Russian), Avdiivk'a – ავდიივკა (Georgian*), Avdijivka - Авді́ївка (Ukrainian)
(France) Avignon	Abinyong – 아비뇽 (Korean*), Avenio (Latin*), Avignon (Croatian*, Dutch*, Finnish*, French*, German*, Romanian*), Avignone (Italian*), Avignoun (Provençal*), Avinhão (Portuguese*), Avinhon (Occitan*), Avinioni – ავინიონი (Georgian*), Avinjon – Авињон (Macedonian*, Serbian*, Bulgarian), Avinjono (Esperanto*), Aviñón (Spanish*), Aviņona (Latvian*), Avinyó (Catalan*), Avin'on – Авиньон (Russian*), Āwéiníwēng – 阿維尼翁/阿维尼翁 (Chinese*), Awinion (Polish*)
(Netherlands) Axel	Aksel (Western Frisian*, Zeelandic*), Akselis (Lithuanian), Axel (Dutch*)
