= Felix Oswald =

Felix Oswald may refer to:

- Felix Leopold Oswald (1845–1906), American naturalist and secularist
- Felix Oswald (archaeologist) (1866–1954), British geologist and archaeologist
