= List of Latin place names in Britain =

This list includes places in Great Britain (including neighbouring islands such as the Isle of Man), some of which were part of the Roman Empire, or were later given Latin place names in historical references.

== Background ==
Until the Modern Era, Latin was the common language for scholarship and mapmaking. During the nineteenth and twentieth centuries, German scholars in particular have made significant contributions to the study of historical place names, or Ortsnamenkunde. These studies have, in turn, contributed to the study of genealogy. For genealogists and historians of pre-Modern Europe, knowing alternative names of places is vital to extracting information from both public and private records. Even specialists in this field point out, however, that the information can be easily taken out of context, since there is a great deal of repetition of place names throughout Europe; reliance purely on apparent connections should therefore be tempered with valid historical methodology.

== Caveats and notes ==
Latin place names are not always exclusive to one place — for example, there were several Roman cities whose names began with Colonia and then a more descriptive term. During the Middle Ages, these were often shortened to just Colonia. One of these, Colonia Agrippinensis, retains the name today in the form of Cologne (from French, German Köln).

Early sources for Roman names show numerous variants and spellings of the Latin names.

The modern canonical name is listed first. In general, only the earliest source is shown for each name, although many of the names are recorded in more than one of the sources. Where the source differs in spelling, or has other alternatives, these are listed following the source. As an aid to searching, variants are spelled completely, and listed in most likely chronology.

== Cities and towns in England ==
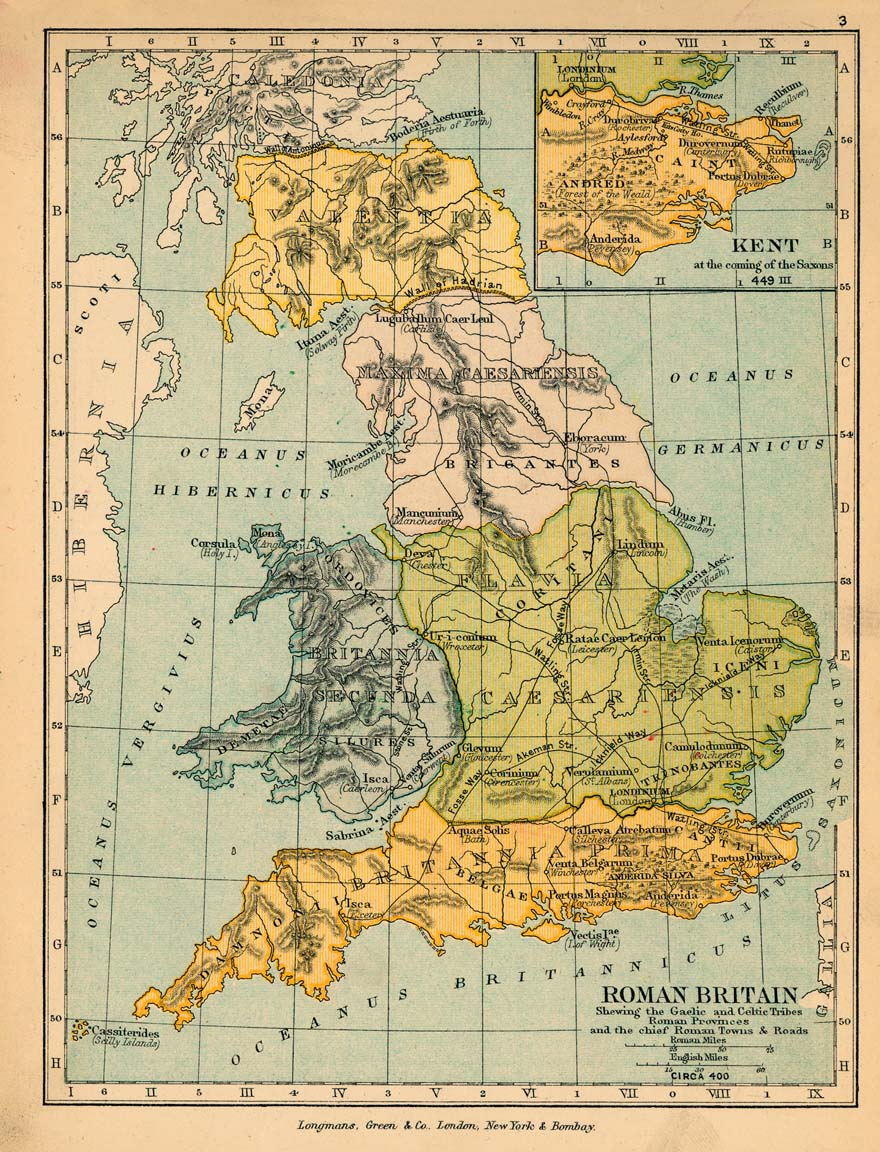
Roman Britain in 400 AD

Latin name	English name
Aquae Arnemetiae	Buxton
Aquae Sulis	Bath
Bremetennacum	Ribchester
Calleva Atrebatum	Silchester
Camulodunum	Colchester
Cantabrigia (medieval Latinisation)	Cambridge
Cataractonium	Catterick
Coria, Corspitium	Corbridge
Corinium	Cirencester
Danum	Doncaster
Deva	Chester
Derventio Coritanorum	Derby
Dunelmum	Durham
Durnovaria	Dorchester
Durocobrivis	Dunstable
Durobrivae	Rochester
Durovernum Cantiacorum, Cantuaria	Canterbury
Eboracum	York
Exonia	Exeter
Glevum	Gloucester
Isca Dumnoniorum	Exeter
Isurium Brigantum	Aldborough
Lindinis	Ilchester
Lindum Colonia	Lincoln
Londinium	London
Londonia	London
Luguvalium	Carlisle
Mamucium, Mancunium	Manchester
Margidunum	Bingham, Nottinghamshire
Noviomagus Reginorum	Chichester
Oxonium, Oxonia	Oxford
Petuaria	Brough
Pons Aelius, Novum Castrum	Newcastle upon Tyne
Ratae Corieltauvorum	Leicester
Rēgulbium, Rēgulvium	Reculver
Rutupiae	Richborough
Sobriodunum	Salisbury
Venta Belgarum, Wintonia	Winchester
Verulamium	St Albans
Vigornia	Worcester
Viroconium Cornoviorum	Wroxeter

== Cities and towns in Scotland ==
Canonical Latin name	Other Latin names	English name
Andreanae	Kirkruel?, Reguli Fanum, Andreopolis; GOL: Sanctae Andreae Coenobium, Kirkrule, Kilrule	St Andrews
Devana	Aberdonia, Aberdona, Verniconam; GOL: Aberdonum, Aberdonium, Abredonia), Devanha	Aberdeen
Dunedinum	Edinburgum, Edinum; GOL: Edimburgum, Edenburgum, Alata castra, Alatius burgus, Aneda, Puellarum castra)	Edinburgh
Glascouium	Glascovia, Glascum, Glascua, Glasgua	Glasgow
Trimontium		Newstead

== Cities and towns in Wales ==
Canonical Latin name	Other Latin names	English name
Alabum		Llandovery
Bangertium		Bangor
Blestium	Monemuta	Monmouth
Bovium		Cowbridge (disputed)
Burrium		Usk
Cambria		Wales
Canovium		Caerhun
Castra Diva		Chester
Cicutio		Pumsaint
Gobannium		Abergavenny
Isca Silurum	Isca, Iscae Isca Augusta, Isca Legio, Castra Legionis	Caerleon
Mediomanum		Caersws
Menevia	Meneva	St Davids
Moridunum		Carmarthen
Nidum		Neath
Segontium	Segontio, Seguntio, Seguntium	Caernarfon
Venta Silurum		Caerwent

== Island names ==
Island names
Latin name	English name
Botis	Bute
Caesarea	Jersey
Clota (Insula)	Arran
Ebudae	Hebrides
Malaeus	Mull
Mona	Anglesey
Monapia, Monaoeda	Isle of Man
Orcades	Orkney
Scetis	Skye
Taniatide	Thanet
Vectis	Isle of Wight

== Region or country names ==
Region or country names
Latin name	English name
Albion	Great Britain
Anglia	England
Britannia	Great Britain
Caledonia	Scotland
Cambria	Wales
Cornubia	Cornwall
Hibernia	Ireland
Orientalium Anglorum	East Anglia
Scotia	Scotland, and formerly applied to Ireland
Salopia	Shropshire

== See also ==
- List of Roman place names in Britain
- List of Latin place names used as specific names

== Sources ==
In order of likely publication:

- TA: Tacitus (Gaius Cornelius Tacitus), Agricola
- PNH: Pliny (Gaius Plinius Secundus), Naturalis Historia; book "PNH" chapter (that is, "37PNH81" instead of the usual "N.H.xxxvii.81").
- PG: Ptolemy (Claudius Ptolemaeus), Geographia; book "PG" chapter (that is, "2PG3" instead of the usual "II.3"). Ptolemy wrote in Greek, so names are transliterated back into Latin to reveal the original form.
- AI: Antonine Itinerary
- ND: Notitia Dignitatum
- RC: Ravenna Cosmography, Ravennatis Anonymi Cosmographia
- BSH: Buchanan, George (1506–1582): Rerum Scoticarum Historia (1582)
- HLU: Hofmann, Johann Jacob (1635–1706): Lexicon Universale
- HD1851: Rejected by modern historians, but seen in this document from 1851 – and (bottom of one page to top of next)
- GOL: The standard reference to Latin placenames, with their modern equivalents, is Dr. J. G. Th. Grässe, Orbis Latinus : Lexikon lateinischer geographischer Namen des Mittelalters und der Neuzeit (1861), an exhaustive work of meticulous German scholarship that is available on-line in the second edition of 1909. To use it, one must understand German names of countries, as they were in 1909. The original was re-edited and expanded in a multi-volume edition in 1972.
- A.L.F. Rivet and Colin Smith, The place-names of Roman Britain, London, 1979 (reprinted by Book Club Associates, 1981).
