= List of Latin names of countries =

This list includes the Roman names of countries, or significant regions, known to the Roman Empire.

Latin Name	English name
Achaea	Greece
Africa	Tunisia
Aegyptus	Egypt
Aethiopia	Sub-Saharan Africa
Albania	Georgia, Azerbaijan
Anatolia	Turkey (East)
Anglia	England
Arabia	Arabian Peninsula
Ariana	Afghanistan, Iran (East) and Central Asia (West)
Armenia	Armenia
Armorica	Brittany
Asia	Turkey (West)
Baetica	Andalusia
Batavia	Part of the Netherlands
Belgae	Belgium and the Netherlands
Bithynia	Turkey (North West)
Bohemia	Bohemia
Borussia	Prussia
Britannia	Britain
Caledonia	Scotland
Cambria	Wales
Cilicia	Turkey (South East)
Colchis	Georgia (Western)
Cornubia	Cornwall
Creta	Crete
Cyprus	Cyprus
Cyrenaica	Libya (East)
Dacia	Romania, Moldova
Dalmatia	Montenegro
Dania	Denmark
Dalmatia	Croatia (South), Bosnia and Herzegovina (West and South)
D(i)ocle(ti)a	Montenegro
Dumnonia	Devon
Epirus	Epirus: composed of the Albanian South and Greek Epirus
Foenicia or Phoenicia	Lebanon
Formosa	Taiwan
Galatia	Turkey (Central)
Gallaecia	Galicia and Portugal (North)
Gallia	France
Germania	Germany
Graecia	Greece
Helvetia	Switzerland
Hibernia	Ireland
Hispania	Spain
Hungaria	Hungary
Iberia	Iberian Peninsula
Iberia	Georgia (Eastern)
India	India and the Indian subcontinent
Islandia	Iceland
Illyria, Illyricum	Croatia, Bosnia and Herzegovina (South), Serbia (South West), Montenegro, Albania (North West)
Italia	Italy
Iudaea	Judea, Israel
Lappia	Lapland
Lechia, Polonia	Poland
Libani	Lebanon
Libya	Libya (Eastern), Egypt (Western)
Lituania	Belarus, Lithuania
Livonia	Estonia and Latvia
Lusitania	Portugal (Central and South)
Macedonia	Macedonia, Greek Macedonia
Mauretania	Morocco (North), Algeria (North West)
Melitae, Melitensium, Melitensis	Malta
Meridia	South Pacific
Moesia	Bulgaria, Serbia
Moravia	Moravia
Noricum	mainly Austria (South) and Slovenia (North)
Norvegia	Norway
Numidia	Algeria (North East)
Palaestina	Palestine
Pannonia	Hungary, Croatia (North), Slovenia (North East)
Parthia	Iran
Phoenicia	Lebanon
Pontus	Turkey (North East)
Raetia	Switzerland (North)
Ruthenia	Russia, Ukraine, Belarus
Sarmatia	Eastern Europe: Poland, Ukraine, Russia
Scandinavia	Scandinavian Peninsula
Scotia	Ireland, Scotland
Scythia	Ukraine, South Russia, Kazakhstan, Uzbekistan (East), Turkmenistan (North)
Scythia Minor	Dobruja
Seres, Sinae	China
Sicilia	Sicily
Silesia	Silesia
Suecia	Sweden
Syria	Syria
Taprobane	Sri Lanka
Tarraconensis	Spain (North East)
Thracia	Greece, Bulgaria, Turkey
Transylvania	Romania, Hungary
Tingitana	Morocco
Tripolitania	Libya
