= List of places named for their main products =

The following places were named for their main products:

- Açailândia, Brazil (from the açaí palm)
- Alumínio, Brazil
- Apatity, Russia
- Argentina (from argentum, "silver" in Latin)
- Asbest, Russia
- Asbestos, Canada (changed in 2021 to Val-des-Sources)
- Batu Arang, Selangor, Malaysia (from Batu Arang, "coal" in Malay)
- Birżebbuġa, Malta (from żebbuġ, "olives")
- Brazil, from brazilwood.
- Carbon County, Utah from the coal mined there.
- Coal Center, Pennsylvania
- Coal City, Illinois
- Copperton, Utah named for the copper processing plants build there
- Côte d'Ivoire
- Diamantina, Brazil
- El Nido, Palawan, Philippines (Spanish for nest, or edible bird's nest)
- Elektrėnai, Lithuania
- Elektrostal, Russia (from the plant of the same name, stal meaning "steel")
- Fermont, Canada (French contraction of "Fer Mont", meaning "Iron Mountain" named for exploited iron ore deposits in Mont Wright)
- Gangcheng, Shandong, China (钢城, literally "the town of steel", gang 钢 meaning "steel" and cheng 城 meaning "city" or "town")
- Gas, Kansas
- Glassport, Pennsylvania
- Gloversville, New York
- Irondale Township, Minnesota and Ironton, Minnesota
- Iron City, Tennessee
- Iron County, Utah named for the iron mines operating there
- Iron Mountain, Michigan
- Kant, Kyrgyzstan (from kant, "sugar")
- Kappara, Malta (Maltese for "caper")
- Lime Ridge, Pennsylvania, a supplier of limestone.
- Mastichochoria, Greece, from the mastic tree and resin.
- Mellieħa, Malta (from melħ, "salt")
- Mountain Iron, Minnesota, named after Mountain Iron Mine
- Neftegorsk, Sakhalin Oblast, Russia (from нефть or neft, "oil") (destroyed in 1995)
- Neftegorsk, Samara Oblast, Russia (from нефть or neft, "oil")
- Nefteyugansk, Russia (from нефть or neft, "oil" and Yugan River)
- Nikel, Russia
- Nitro, West Virginia
- Nowa Sól, Poland (from sól, "salt")
- Oil City, Pennsylvania
- Oildale, California
- Ouro Preto, Brazil (Portuguese for "black gold")
- Saffron Walden, Essex, UK
- Salihorsk, Belarus (from sol, "salt")
- Salzburg, Austria, and many other German-speaking places beginning with Salz- (salt)
- Silverton, New South Wales, Australia
- Srebrna Góra, Lower Silesian Voivodeship, Poland (from srebro, "silver")
- Stalowa Wola, Poland (from stal, "steel")
- Steelton, Pennsylvania
- Szklarska Poręba, Poland (from szkło, "glass")
- Tabaco, Philippines (Spanish for tobacco, the city's traditional product)
- Tongling, Anhui, China (铜陵, literally "copper hills", tong 铜 meaning "copper" and ling 陵 meaning "hills")
- Uglegorsk, Sakhalin Oblast, Russia (from ugol, "coal")
- Uranium City, Saskatchewan, Canada
- Vale do Aço, Brazil (Portuguese for "steel valley")
- Vuhlehirsk, Ukraine (from вугіль, or vuhil, "coal")
- Węgliniec, Poland (from węgiel, "coal")
- Żebbuġ, Malta and Żebbuġ, Gozo (Maltese for "olives")
- Żejtun, Malta (Siculo-Arabic for "olives")
- Zernograd, Russia (from зерно, or zerno, "grain" or "corn")
