= Sitomagus =

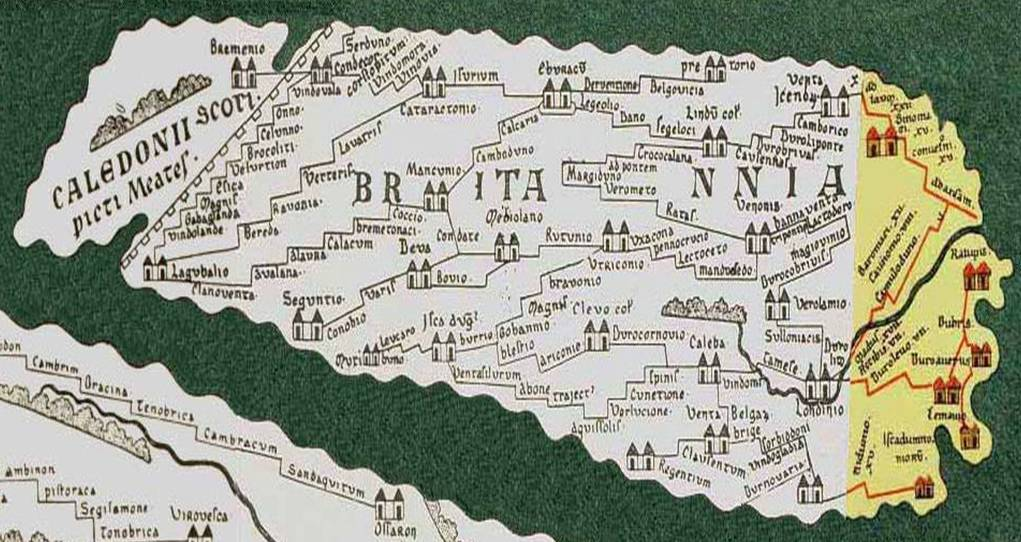
Senomagus (top right) in Britannia in the Tabula Peutingeriana

Sitomagus (also known as Sitomagum, Sitomago, and Senomagus) was a town in Roman Britain located in the province Flavia Caesariensis (now East Anglia) about 30 miles south of Venta Icenorum (now Caistor St Edmund) on the road to Londinium (now London) on route IX in the Antonine Itinerary, the location of which in Suffolk or Norfolk is uncertain.

The town has been associated with the Iceni. Proposed locations include Thetford, Ixworth, Stowmarket, Dunwich, Southwold, and Saxmundham.

The name "sito-" may derive from the Celtic for "wide" or "long", or "seno-" meaning "old", and "magus" meaning "market" or "plain". The version of the name as Senomagus appears in the Tabula Peutingeriana, an inaccurate 13th-century copy of a Roman map.
