= Historical African place names =

Names previously used for regions in Africa

This is a list of historical African place names. The names on the left are linked to the corresponding subregion(s) from History of Africa.

- Axum - Eritrea and Ethiopia
- Africa (province) - Tunisia
- Barbary Coast - Algeria
- Bechuanaland - Botswana
- Belgian Congo - Democratic Republic of the Congo
- Carthage - Tunisia
- Central African Empire - Central African Republic
- Congo Free State - Democratic Republic of the Congo
- Dahomey - Benin
- Equatoria - Sudan and Uganda
- Fernando Pó - Bioko
- French Congo - Gabon and Republic of the Congo
- French Equatorial Africa - Chad, Central African Republic, Gabon, Republic of the Congo
- French Sudan - Mali
- French West Africa - Mauritania, Senegal, Mali, Guinea, Ivory Coast, Niger, Burkina Faso, and Benin
- German East Africa - Tanzania and Zanzibar
- German South-West Africa - Namibia
- The Gold Coast - Ghana
- Guinea
- Grain Coast or Pepper Coast - Liberia
- Malagasy Republic - Madagascar
- Mauritania Tingitana-Morocco
- Mdre Bahri -Eritrea
- Monomotapa - Zimbabwe, South Africa, Lesotho, Swaziland, Mozambique and parts of Namibia and Botswana
- Middle Congo - Republic of the Congo
- Nubia - Sudan and Egypt
- Numidia - Algeria, Libya and Tunisia
- Nyasaland - Malawi
- Western Pentapolis - Libya
- Portuguese Guinea - Guinea-Bissau
- Rhodesia -

- Northern Rhodesia - Zambia
- Southern Rhodesia - Zimbabwe

- (Southern Rhodesia was commonly referred to simply as Rhodesia from 1964 to 1980)

- Rwanda-Urundi - Rwanda and Burundi
- The Slave Coast - Benin
- Somaliland - Somalia
- South-West Africa - Namibia
- Spanish Sahara - Western Sahara
- Swaziland - Eswatini
- French Upper Volta - Republic of Upper Volta - Burkina Faso
- Zaire - Republic of the Congo - Democratic Republic of the Congo

== See also ==
- List of former sovereign states
