= Libani =

Latin term

Libani is the genitive form of the Latin Libanus, meaning Lebanon, referring to the country and the two mountain ranges, Mount Lebanon and the Anti-Lebanon. During classical antiquity, the country of Lebanon was known as Phoenicia.

== Modern usage ==
The best example of the usage of the term in modern times is Opus Libani, which refers to Pope John Paul II's Apostolic Guidance No. 111, “A New Hope for Lebanon" and Synod for the Sake of Lebanon.
