= Felix Oswald (archaeologist) =

British geologist and archaeologist

Felix Oswald DSc, FSA, FGS (3 November 1866 – 3 November 1954) was a geologist and archaeologist who specialised in the study of Roman samian pottery and was notable for his study of the geology of the Caucasus and central Africa.

He was the son of Dr Oswald, founder of the Carlye society. His mother was a notable pianist and a friend of Clara Schumann.

After studying at the University of London he graduated with a BA degree in 1889. He then joined the civil service and studied geology, botany and zoology in his spare time. He was then awarded a BSc degree with first class honours from London in 1897.

In 1898 he toured Turkish Armenia with H F B Lynch and wrote a book "The Geology of Armenia" which he submitted for the degree of DSc at the University of London. The cost of providing copies for the examiners was too high so he set up a press and printed 200 copies with the assistance of his wife at their home in Dulwich.

In 1911 he went to Central Africa, for the British Museum, to investigate Mid-Tertiary Age fossil beds of that had been discovered near Victoria Nyanza. In 1915 he travelled to the Caucasus, to study the geology of oilfields for The Anglo-Maikop Company. He then produced a geological map of the Caucasus.

He was appointed as the Probate Registrar for Nottingham, Leicester, Lincoln, and Derbyshire and moved to Nottingham. Between 1910 and 1936 he excavated the Roman camp of Margidunum in Nottinghamshire. This site produced a large amount of samian or Terra Sigillata pottery. Oswald wrote several works on samian pottery and donated his pottery collection to the University of Nottingham.

He retired in 1936 and moved to Solva in Pembrokeshire.

== Honours and awards ==
Oswald was elected a Fellow of the Geological society in 1907. He received an award from the society's Murchison fund for his work in Armenia.

He was a fellow of the Society of Antiquaries of London and he was made an honorary Reader in the History of Roman Britain at the University of Nottingham.

== Select Bibliography ==
Oswald, Felix (1905). A treatise on the geology of Armenia : [thesis]. London: [Felix Oswald].

Oswald, Felix (1907), A Geological Map of Armenia, and its border-ranges with indications of minerals & mineral-springs. Drawn and hand- coloured by Felix Oswald, D.SC., F.G.S. ... Scale, 16 miles= 1 inch. (1: 1,013,760.) (Explanatory Notes to accompany a Geological Map of Armenia ... By Felix Oswald, etc. pp. 16)., London: Dulau & Co

Oswald, Felix (1914), A Geological Map of the Caucasus... by Felix Oswald ... Scale, 1: 1,000,000. (Explanatory Notes to accompany the Geological Map of the Caucasus. pp. 16)., Nottingham

Oswald, Felix (1915). Alone in the sleeping-sickness country. London: Kegan Paul, Trench Trubner.

Oswald, Felix (1915), British East Africa. The district between the Victoria Nyanza and the Kisii Highlands. By Dr. F. Oswald. Scale, 1: 400,000 or 1 inch = 6.31 stat. miles., London: Kegan Paul, Trench, Trübner & Co

Oswald, Felix (1920). An introduction to the terra sigillata: treated from a chronological standpoint. S.l: Longmans.

Nottingham Castle Museum (1928). Margidunum. An account of the excavations on the site of the Roman station on the Fosse Way, near Bingham, Notts. By Felix Oswald. [With illustrations.] Nottingham.

Oswald, Felix Arthur Clair. (1931). Index of Potters' stamps on Terra Sigillata "Samian Ware". With a supplement (to be consulted in conjunction with the index) of stamps obtained or recorded during the period of printing the index (with corrections.). East Bridgford, Notts.

University of Liverpool Institute of Archaeology (1936). Index of Figure-types on Terra Sigillata-"Samian Ware." By Felix Oswald. Issued as a Supplement to The Annals of Archaeology and Anthropology. Liverpool.

Oswald, Felix; University College (Nottingham, England); Oswald, Felix. (1948). The terra sigillata (samian ware) of Margidunum. Nottingham: University College.

Oswald, Felix; University College (Nottingham, England); Oswald, Felix.; University College (Nottingham, England). Department of Classics. (1948). The Commandant's House at Margidunum. Nottingham: University College.
