= List of Latin names of regions =

Here is a list of principalities and regions written in the Latin language and English and other names on the right.

- cty. - county
- dept. - department
- dist. - district
- isl. -island
- kdom. - kingdom
- pen - peninsula
- pref. - prefecture
- prin. - principality
- prphy. - periphery
- prov. - province
- reg. - region
- state - state

== List of names ==
Latin	English name(s) [other name(s)] or [older name(s)] of subdivisions
Alandia	Åland
Alberta	Alberta (prov.)
Amazon (state)	Amazonas, most pref. Amazon
Angermannia	Ångermanland, Sweden
Antverpia	Antwerp (prov.)
Apulia	Apulia (Puglia)
Arcadia	Arcadia (pref.), Greece
Argolis	Argolis, Argolida (pref.), Greece
Australia Australis	South Australia
Australia Occidentalis	Western Australia (state)
Badenia-Virtembergia	Baden-Württemberg (reg.), Germany
Bahusia	Bohuslän, Sweden
Blechingia	Blekinge, Sweden
Boeotia	Boeotia (pref.), Greece
Bohemia	Bohemia (Čechy/Böhmen) (reg.), Czech Republic
Borussia, Prussia	Prussia
Brabantia Flandrica	Flemish Brabant (prov.)
Brabantia Vallonica	Walloon Brabant (prov.)
Brosella	Brussels (reg.)
Calabria	Calabria, Italy
California Superior	Alta California, now California (state)
California	California (state) United States, (2 states) Mexico
Campania	Campania (reg.)
Cansa, Cansae, Cansas	Kansas (state), United States (America)
Carinthia	Carinthia (reg.), Austria
Carolina Australis	South Carolina (state), United States
Carolina Borealis	North Carolina (state), United States
Cassubia	Kashubia
Caucasia	Caucasus (reg.), Russia, Armenia, Azerbaijan and Georgia
Chodovia	Chod region (Chodsko/Chodenland) (reg.), Czech Republic
Ciscaucasia	Ciscaucasia (reg.), Russia
Cisjordania	West Bank (reg.), Palestine
Columbia Britannica	British Columbia (prov.)
Corinthia	Corinthia (pref.), Greece
Creta	Crete (prphy.)
Cuiavia	Kuyavia (reg.), Poland
Dacota Australis	South Dakota (state), United States
Dacota Borealis	North Dakota (state), United States
Dalecarlia	Dalarna, Sweden
Dalia	Dalsland, Sweden
Dalmatia	Dalmatia (reg.), Croatia
Demetae (fmr. kdom. and prin.)	Dyfed cty.
Elea, Elia?	Ilia, Elia (pref, fmr. dept.), Greece
Epirus Borealis	Southern Albania, (Northern Epirus)
Epirus	Epirus (prphy.)
Estonia	Estonia
Euboea	Euboea (pref.), (isl.), Greece
Eurytania	Eurytania, Evrytania (pref.), Greece
Finlandia	Finland
Finlandia Australis-Occidentalis	Southwest Finland (South Finland/Egentliga Finland/Varsinais-Suomi), Finland
Finlandia Borealis	Satakunda (North Finland/Satakunta), Finland
Fionia	Funen, Denmark
Flandria	Flanders (reg.)
Flandria Occidentalis	West Flanders (prov.)
Flandria Orientalis	East Flanders (prov.)
Flumen Januarii (state)	Rio de Janeiro (state) some RJ metro
Forum Iulii et Venetia Iulia	Friuli-Venezia Giulia
Forum Iulii	Friuli
Galicia	Galicia (reg.), Ukraine and Poland
Georgia (state)	Georgia
Gestricia	Gästrikland, Sweden
Gothia	Götaland, Sweden also Gothenburg
Gotlandia	Gotland, Sweden
Graecia Centralis	Central Greece (prphy.)
Hallandia	Halland, Sweden
Hanakia, Hana, Hanna	Hanakia (reg.), Czech Republic
Hannonia	Hainaut (prov.)
Helsingia	Hälsingland, Sweden
Herdalia	Härjedalen, Sweden
Hungaria Superior	Upper Hungary (Felvidék) (reg.), Slovakia and Ukraine
Ingria	Ingria (Ingermanland/Inkeri), Estonia and Russia
Ionia (dist.)	Ionia (Western Turkey)
Istria	Istria (reg.), Croatia
Jemtia	Jämtland, Sweden
Jutlandia	Jutland, Denmark
Karelia	Karelia (Karelen/Karjala), Finland and Russia
Lachia	Lachia (reg.), Czech Republic
Lacinia Gazetica	Gaza Strip (reg.), Palestine
Laconia, Lacedaemonia	Laconia (pref.), Greece
Lalandia	Lolland, Denmark
Langobardia	Lombardy (Lombardia), Italy (reg.)
Lappa, Lappia, Lapponia, Loppia	Lapland, Finland and Sweden
Lasithia	Lasithia (pref.), Greece
Latium (reg.)	Lazio (reg.)
Leodium	Liège (prov.)
Liguria	Liguria
Limburgum	Limburg (prov.)
Limburgum	Limburg (prov.)
Livonia	Livonia (Livland), Latvia and Estonia
Lucania	Basilicata, some prefer Lucania
Lusatia Inferior	Lower Lusatia
Lusatia Superior	Upper Lusatia
Luxemburgum	Luxemburg (prov.)
Macedonia	Macedonia
Magnesia	Magnesia Prefecture, Greece
Marchiæ	Marche (reg.), Italy
Masovia, Mazovia	Masovia (Mazowsze), prov. of Poland
Medelpadia	Medelpad, Sweden
Michigania	Michigan (state), United States
Moravia	Moravia, (Morava) (reg.), Czech Republic
Moravia Slovaca	Moravian Slovakia, (Slovácko) (reg.), Czech Republic
Namurcum	Namur (prov.)
Nericia	Närke, Sweden
Nigeria	Nigeria
Nova Belgica	New Netherland
Nova Caesarea	New Jersey (state)
Nova Cambria Australis	New South Wales
Nova Hantonia	New Hampshire (state)
Nova Scotia	Nova Scotia (prov.)
Nova Terra et Labrador	Newfoundland and Labrador (prov.)
Nova Terra	formerly Newfoundland (prov.)
Nova Zelandia	New Zealand
Nova Brunsvicum	New Brunswick (prov.), Canada
Nova Eboracum	New York (state)
Nylandia	Nyland (Uusimaa), Finland
Oelandia	Öland, Sweden
Ostrobothnia	Österbotten (Pohjanmaa), Finland
Ostrogothia	Östergötland, Sweden
Patagonia	Patagonia, Argentina, Chile
Pedemontium	Piedmont, Italy
Pella	Pella Prefecture, Greece
Peloponnesus (pen.)	Peloponnesus, Peloponnese (prphy.) / (pen.)
Pennsylvania	Pennsylvania (state)
Phocis	Phocis (Phokida, Phokis) (pref.), Greece
Phthotis	Phthotis, Phthotida (pref.), Greece
Pieria	Pieria, Greece
Podlachia	Podlaskie (reg.), Poland and Belarus
Podolia	Podolia (reg.), Ukraine
Polonia Maior	Greater Poland (Wielkopolska), prov. of Poland
Polonia Minor	Lesser Poland (Małopolska), prov. of Poland
Pomerania Inferior	Hither Pomerania (Vorpommern), reg. of Germany
Pomerania Superior	Farther Pomerania (Pomorze Zaodrzańskie), reg. of Poland
Pomerania	Pomerania (Pomorze/Pommern) (reg.), Poland and Germany
Principis Eduardi, Insula	Prince Edward Island
Prussia, Borussia	Prussia
Respublica Africa Centralis	Central African Republic
Rhodope	Rhodope (p.), Greece
Ruthenia Alba	White Ruthenia (reg.), Belarus
Ruthenia Nigra	Black Ruthenia (reg.), Belarus
Ruthenia Rubra	Red Ruthenia (reg.), Ukraine and Poland
Ruthenia Subcarpathanea	Subcarpathian Ruthenia (reg.), Ukraine
Salisburgium	Salzburg (reg.), Austria
Sambia	Sambia (Baltic) pen., Russia
Samogitia	Samogitia (Žemaitija) (reg.), Lithuania
Sanctus Paulus	São Paulo (state) some SP metro
Savonia	Savonia (Savolaks/Savolax/Savo), Finland
Saxonia-Anhaltinum	Saxony-Anhalt (reg.), Germany
Scania	Skåne, Sweden
Zelandia	Zealand, Denmark
Sicilia	Sicily
Silesia Inferior	Lower Silesia (Dolny Śląsk), prov. of Poland
Silesia Superior	Upper Silesia (Górny Śląsk), prov. of Poland
Silesia	Silesia (Śląsk/Slezsko) reg., Poland and Czech Republic
Smalandia	Småland, Sweden
Styria	Styria (reg.), Austria
Sudermannia	Södermanland, Sweden
Sudetia	Sudetenland (Sudety/pohraniční území) (reg.), Czech Republic
Suecia	Sweden
Tasmania	Tasmania, Australia
Tavastia	Tavastia (Tavastland, Häme), Finland
Terra Nova et Labrador	Newfoundland and Labrador
Terra Scania	Terra Scania (Skåneland), Sweden
Territoria Borealis	Northern Territory
Territoria Borealis-Occidentalis	Northwest Territories, Northwest Territory
Thesprotia	Thesprotia (pref.), Greece
Thessalia	Thessaly (prphy.)
Thracia	Thrace (prphy.), Southern Bulgaria, Western Turkey
Transcarpathia	Transcarpathia (reg.), Ukraine
Transcaucasia	Transcaucasia (reg.), Armenia, Azerbaijan and Georgia
Transnistria	Transnistria (reg.), Moldova
Tridentinum et Tirolum Meridionale	Trentino-Alto Adige/Südtirol
Tuscia	Tuscany
Tzechia	Bohemia (Čechy)
Ucraina Transcarpathanea	Transcarpathian Ukraine (reg.), Ukraine
Umbria	Umbria (reg.)
Uplandia	Uppland, Sweden
Valachia	Wallachia (reg.), Romania
Valachia Moravica	Moravian Wallachia (reg.), Czech Republic
Vallis Augustana	Val d'Aosta
Vallonia	Wallonia (reg.)
Vasingtonia (state)	Washington (state)
Victoria (Regna)	Victoria (state)
Volhynia	Volhynia (reg.), Ukraine
Wermelandia	Värmland, Sweden
Westmannia	Västmanland, Sweden
Westrobothnia	Västerbotten, Sweden
Westrogothia	Västergötland, Sweden

Latinized form of a Greek derived name

== See also ==
- Polish historical regions
