= Margidunum =

Roman settlement in Nottinghamshire

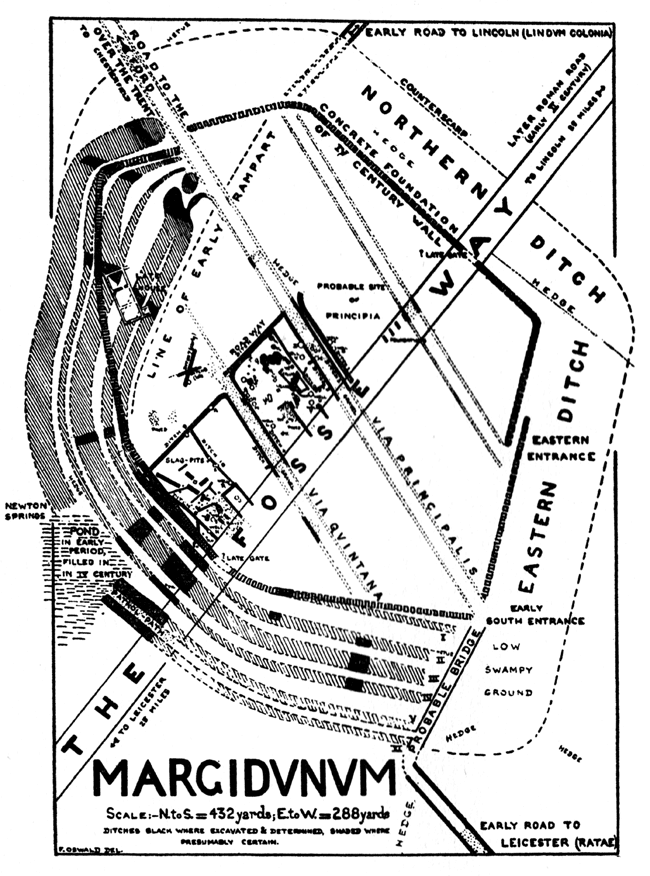
- 1927 plan of Margidunum
- Interactive map of Margidunum
- 52°58′2″N 0°57′35″W
- Type: Settlement
- Periods: Romano-British
- Location: Bingham
- Region: Nottinghamshire, England

Site notes
- Condition: Buried remains
- Public access: Footpath

Scheduled monument
- Official name: Margidunum Roman Station
- Reference no.: 1006395

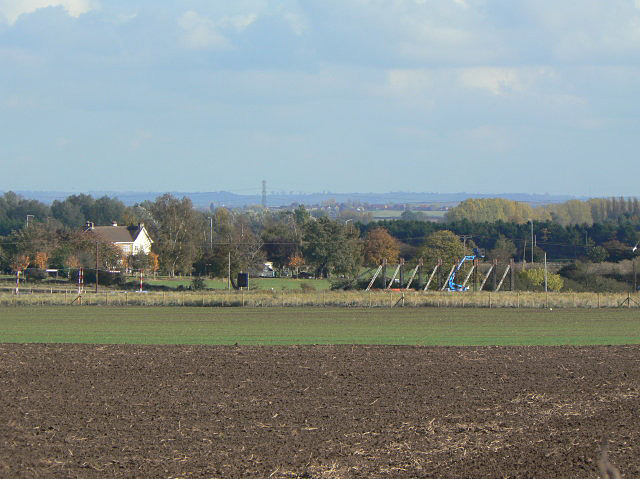
View towards Margidunum

Margidunum was a Roman settlement on the Fosse Way at Castle Hill near present-day Bingham, in Nottinghamshire, England. The site is a protected Scheduled Monument.

== Description ==
Margidunum in Latin means 'marly fort' (marl is a lime-rich clay soil). However, archaeologist Felix Oswald expected that the Romans would have adopted an existing place name and he determined its Celtic meaning to be "the fort of the king's plain", the raised ground being a suitable position for the hill-fort of the king of the Coritani tribe.

The Antonine Itinerary, a 2nd-century Roman register of places and roads, (Iter Britanniarum VI and VIII) locates Margidunum as MARGIDVNO midway between Ratae (Leicester) and Lindum (Lincoln) on the Fosse Way. Finds of military equipment established that it was initially a military post in about 55–60 AD, although no parts of a fort structure have been found. Forts were sited at close intervals along the Fosse Way to protect the Roman territory from the hostile Brigantes and Iceni tribes.

A civilian settlement then developed in about 70–80 AD on either side of the Fosse Way, indicated by several simple rectangular buildings along about a 1 km stretch of the road. Two Roman villas have been found within 3 km of the settlement, as well as Roman farms in the surrounding area. A rhomboid-shaped earthwork defence was built in the late 2nd century around the camp, enclosing about 7 or 8 acres. A stone wall nearly 3m wide was later built in front of the earth rampart, with two ditches beyond it. The fort was protected to the south and east by marshland. The site remained occupied until about 500 AD.

== Investigations ==
In 1722 William Stukeley visited the site and documented, in his 1724 book Itinerarium Curiosum, his observations of Roman foundations of walls, floors of houses and regularly-spaced oak posts. In 1896 'Castle Hill Close' field on the 'Foss Road' was reported as the supposed site of the important Roman station of Margidunum, with Roman pottery and coins found there.

Excavations were conducted by Nottingham University in the 1920s by Felix Oswald, and again in the 1960s by Malcolm Todd. Oswald found prehistoric artefacts including a Bronze Age flint arrowhead, polished stone axes and bronze socketed celts. The 20th-century excavations discovered the stone walls and stone slab floors or beaten clay floors of over 20 Roman buildings at the site. Foundations of three large adjacent buildings show that they were the most elaborate at the site. Numerous fragments of window glass, roof tiles and evidence of underfloor heating (floors raised on pillars and box flue tiles) indicate that one of these buildings was a bathhouse. It would have had stone walls, whereas the other buildings were timber-framed with wattle and daub walls. The largest building had no internal divisions, so it was likely to be a public building. Fragments of decorated wall plaster, mosaic floor tiles, pottery, a grid iron, charred timbers, several wells, water tanks and coins were also discovered. The oldest Claudian well was lined with oak planks encased in clay, whereas the later wells were stone-lined. The wells drew water from the underground source of the nearby Newton Springs.

Oswald identified the route of two other roads crossing the camp. He deduced that one of these was probably used to transport lead from the Lutudarum lead-mines in Derbyshire, because a large lead ingot inscribed C.IVL.PROTI.BRIT.LVT.EX.ARG. was found in 1848 at Hexgrave Park near Mansfield.

The site of Margidunum now lies mostly across three fields but it is partially covered by a roundabout built in 1968

== Nearby sites ==
The Roman fort of Ad Pontem (at East Stoke near Newark) was 10 miles further north along the Fosse Way. It was also a small 1st-century fort with a similar rhomboid-shaped earthwork enclosure. A settlement developed on the site and Roman occupation continued into the 4th century. Two Iron Age huts were also found there.

Roman camps have also been discovered at nearby Calverton and Farnsfield, and they too are Scheduled Monuments.
