= Mining =

Extraction of valuable minerals or other geological materials from the Earth

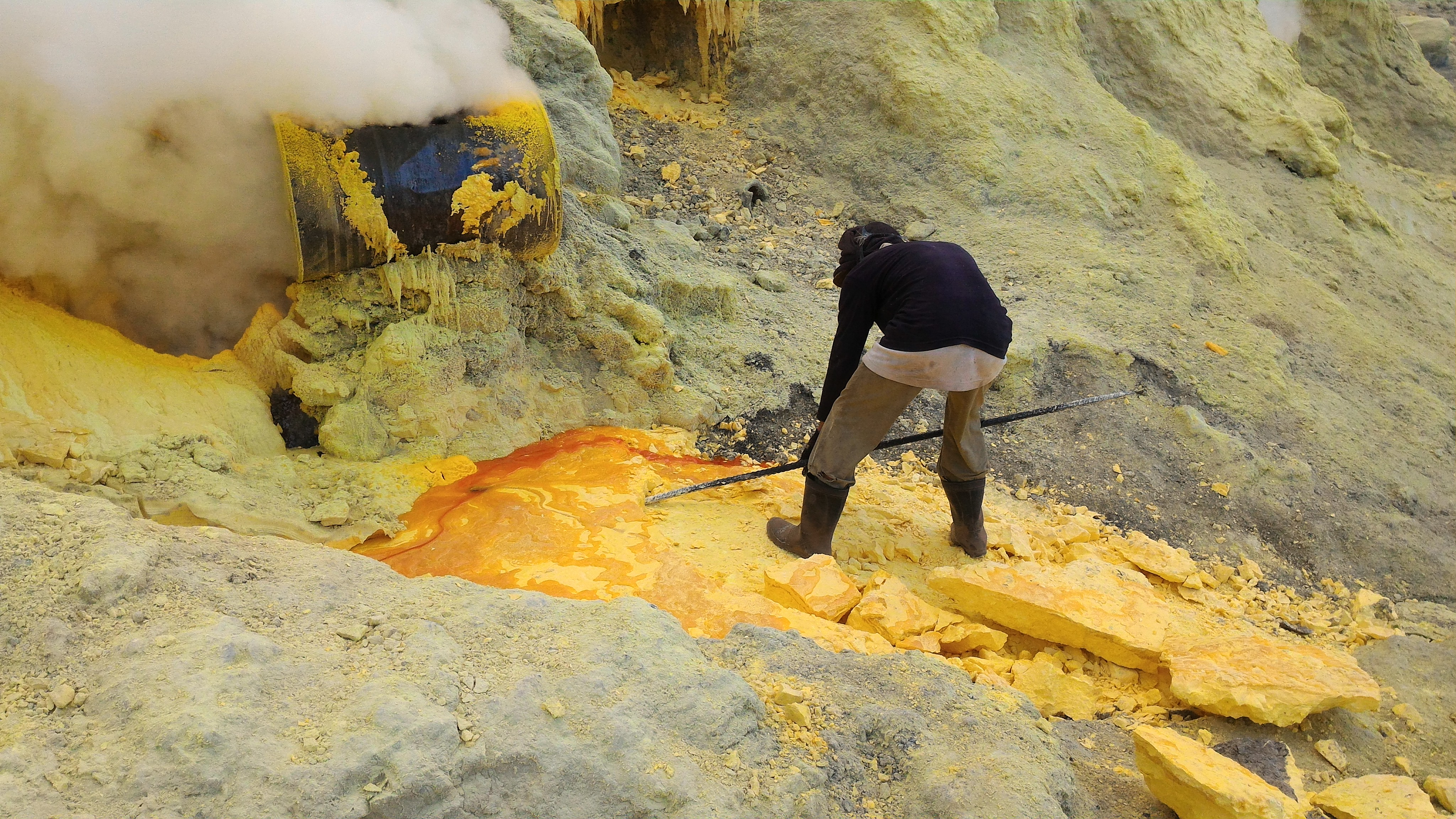
Mining of sulfur from a deposit at the edge of Ijen's crater lake, Indonesia

Mining is the extraction of geological materials and minerals from Earth's surface. Mining is required to obtain most materials that cannot be grown through agricultural processes, or feasibly made artificially in a laboratory or factory. Ores recovered by mining include metals, coal, oil shale, gemstones, limestone, chalk, dimension stone, rock salt, potash, gravel, and clay. The ore must be a rock or mineral that contains a valuable constituent, can be extracted or mined, and sold for profit. Mining in a wider sense includes extraction of any non-renewable resource such as petroleum, natural gas, or even water.

Mining is also associated with a range of environmental, health, and social impacts. Mining activities contribute to land degradation, water contamination, and habitat loss. In addition to environmental impacts, mining has been linked to occupational health risks and community displacement, and has affected low-income and marginalized populations.

Modern mining processes involve prospecting for ore bodies, analysis of the profit potential of a proposed mine, extraction of the desired materials, and final reclamation or restoration of the land after the mine is closed. Mining materials are often obtained from ore bodies, lodes, veins, seams, reefs, or placer deposits. The exploitation of these deposits for raw materials is dependent on investment, labor, energy, refining, and transportation costs.

Mining operations can have negative environmental impacts, both during mining and after the mine closes. Hence, most of the world's nations have enacted regulations to reduce the impact; however, the outsized role of mining in generating business for often rural, remote, or economically depressed communities means that governments frequently fail to enforce them fully.

Work safety has long been a concern as well, and where enforced, modern practices have significantly improved safety in mines. Unregulated, poorly regulated or illegal mining, especially in developing economies, frequently contributes to local human rights violations and environmental conflicts. Mining can also perpetuate political instability through resource conflicts.

== History ==
=== Prehistory ===
Since the beginning of civilization, people have used stone, clay, and, later, metals found near the Earth's surface. These were used to make early tools and weapons; for example, high-quality flint found in northern France, southern England, and Poland was used to create flint tools. Flint mines have been found in chalk areas where seams of the stone were followed underground by shafts and galleries. The mines at Grimes Graves and Krzemionki are especially famous, and like most other flint mines, are Neolithic in origin (c. 4000–3000 BC). Other hard rocks mined or collected for axes included the greenstone of the Langdale axe industry based in the English Lake District. The oldest-known mine in the archaeological record is the Ngwenya Mine in Eswatini (Swaziland), which radiocarbon dating indicates is about 41,000 - 43,000 years old. At this site Paleolithic humans mined hematite to make the red pigment ochre. Mines of a similar age in Hungary are believed to be sites where Neanderthals may have mined flint for weapons and tools.

=== Ancient Egypt ===
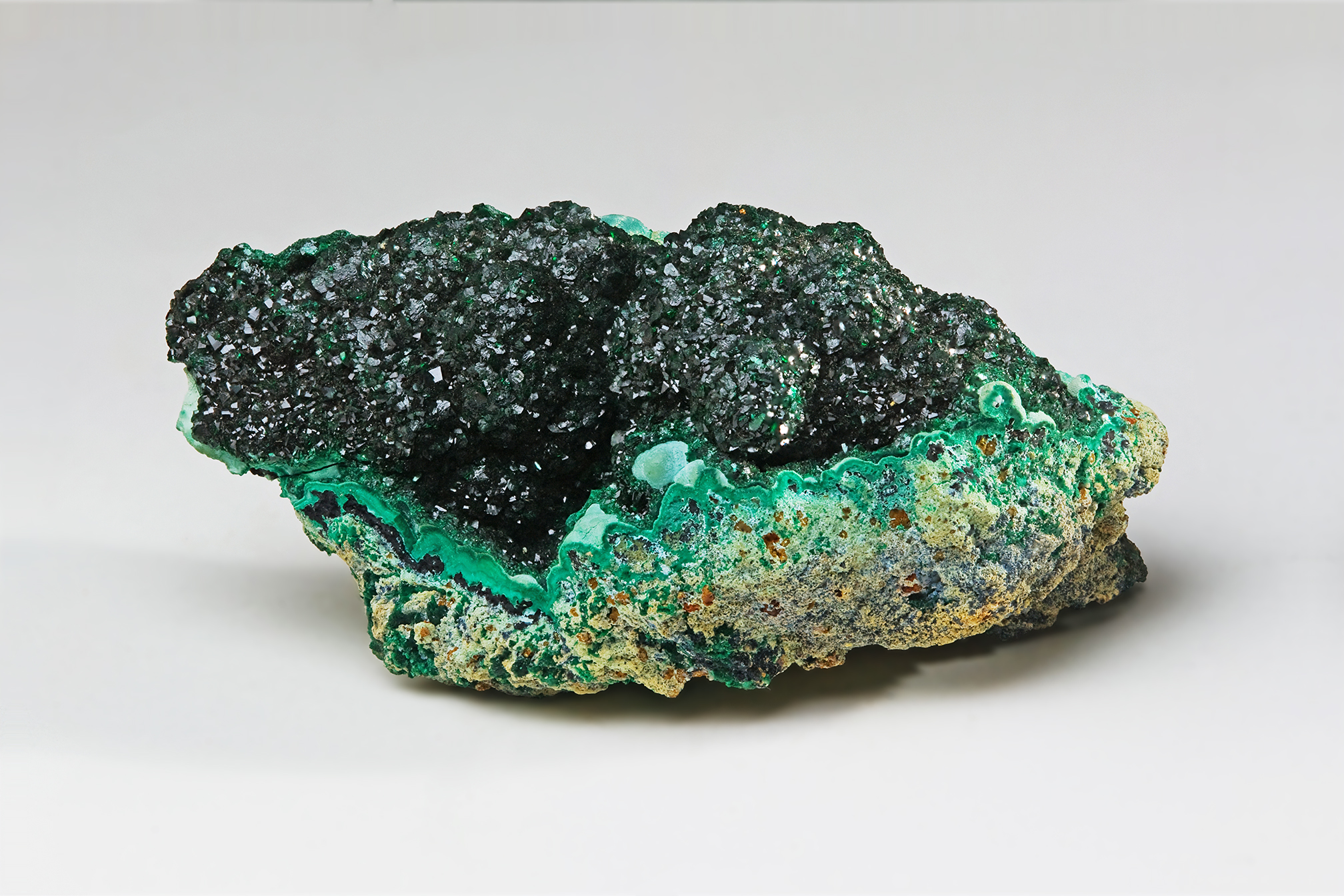
Malachite

Ancient Egyptians mined malachite at Maadi. At first, Egyptians used the bright green malachite stones for ornamentations and pottery. Later, between 2613 and 2494 BC, large building projects required expeditions abroad to the Wadi Maghareh region to secure minerals and other resources not available in Egypt itself. Quarries for turquoise and copper were also found at Wadi Hammamat, Tura, Aswan and various other Nubian sites, on the Sinai Peninsula, and at Timna. Quarries for gypsum were found at the Umm el-Sawwan site; gypsum was used to make funerary items for private tombs. Other minerals mined in Egypt from the Old Kingdom (2649–2134 BC) until the Roman Period (30 BC-AD 395) including granite, sandstone, limestone, basalt, travertine, gneiss, galena, and amethyst.

Mining in Egypt occurred in the earliest dynasties. The gold mines of Nubia were among the most extensive of any in Ancient Egypt. These mines are described by the Greek author Diodorus Siculus, who mentions fire-setting as one method used to break down the hard rock holding the gold. One of the complexes is shown in one of the earliest known mining maps. The miners crushed the ore and ground it to a fine powder before washing the powder for the gold dust known as the dry and wet attachment processes.

=== Ancient Greece and Rome ===
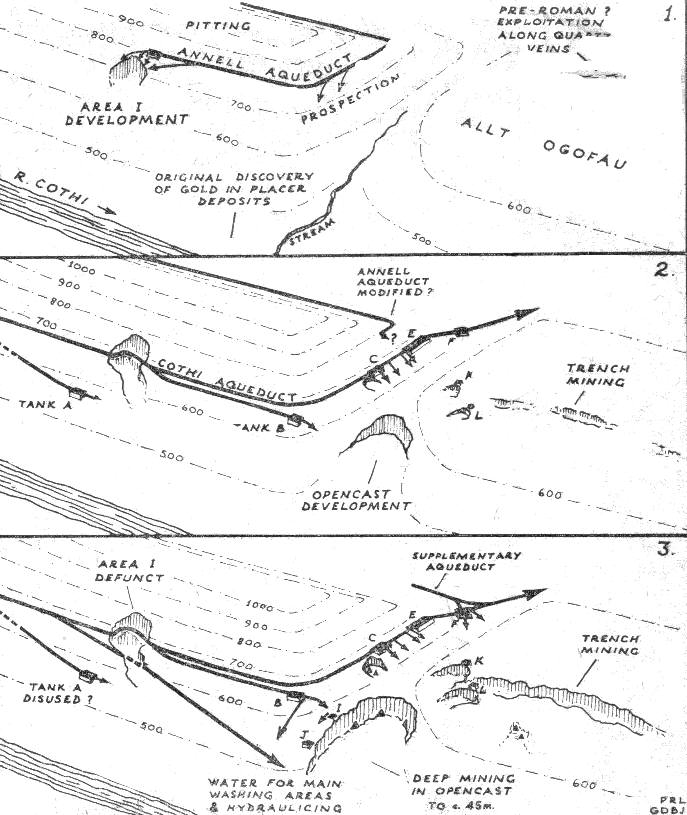
Ancient Roman development of the Dolaucothi Gold Mines, Wales

Mining in Europe has a very long history. Examples include the silver mines of Laurium, which helped support the Greek city state of Athens. Although they had over 20,000 slaves working them, their technology was essentially identical to their Bronze Age predecessors. At other mines, such as on the island of Thassos, marble was quarried by the Parians after they arrived in the 7th century BC. The marble was shipped away and was later found by archaeologists to have been used in buildings including the tomb of Amphipolis. Philip II of Macedon, the father of Alexander the Great, captured the gold mines of Mount Pangeo in 357 BC to fund his military campaigns. He also captured gold mines in Thrace for minting coinage, eventually producing 26 tons per year.

However, it was the Romans who developed large-scale mining methods, especially the use of large volumes of water brought to the minehead by numerous aqueducts. The water was used for a variety of purposes, including removing overburden and rock debris (a process called hydraulic mining), washing comminuted (or crushed) ores, and driving simple machinery.

The Romans used hydraulic mining methods on a large scale to prospect for the veins of ore, especially using a now-obsolete form of mining known as hushing. They built numerous aqueducts to supply water to the minehead, where the water was stored in large reservoirs and tanks. When a full tank was opened, the flood of water sluiced away the overburden to expose the bedrock underneath and any gold-bearing veins. The rock was then worked by fire-setting, heating it and then quenching it with a stream of water. The resulting thermal shock cracked the rock, enabling it to be removed by further streams of water from the overhead tanks. The Roman miners used similar methods to work cassiterite deposits in Cornwall and lead ore in the Pennines.

Sluicing methods were developed by the Romans in Spain in 25 AD to exploit large alluvial gold deposits, the largest site being at Las Medulas, where seven long aqueducts tapped local rivers and sluiced the deposits. The Romans also exploited the silver present in the argentiferous galena in the mines of Cartagena (Cartago Nova), Linares (Castulo), Plasenzuela and Azuaga, among many others. Spain was one of the most important mining regions, but all regions of the Roman Empire were exploited. In Great Britain the natives had mined minerals for millennia, but after the Roman conquest, the scale of the operations increased dramatically, as the Romans needed Britannia's resources, especially gold, silver, tin, and lead.

Roman techniques were not limited to surface mining. They followed the ore veins underground once opencast mining was no longer feasible. At Dolaucothi they stoped out the veins and drove adits through bare rock to drain the stopes. The same adits were also used to ventilate the workings, especially important when fire-setting was used. At other parts of the site, they penetrated the water table and dewatered the mines using several kinds of machines, especially reverse overshot water-wheels. These were used extensively in the copper mines at Rio Tinto in Spain, where one sequence comprised 16 such wheels arranged in pairs, and lifting water about 24 metres (79 ft). They worked as treadmills with miners standing on the top slats. Many examples of such devices have been found in old Roman mines, and some examples are now preserved in the British Museum and the National Museum of Wales.

=== Medieval Europe ===
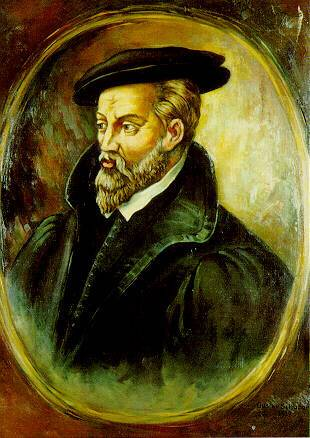
Agricola, author of De Re Metallica

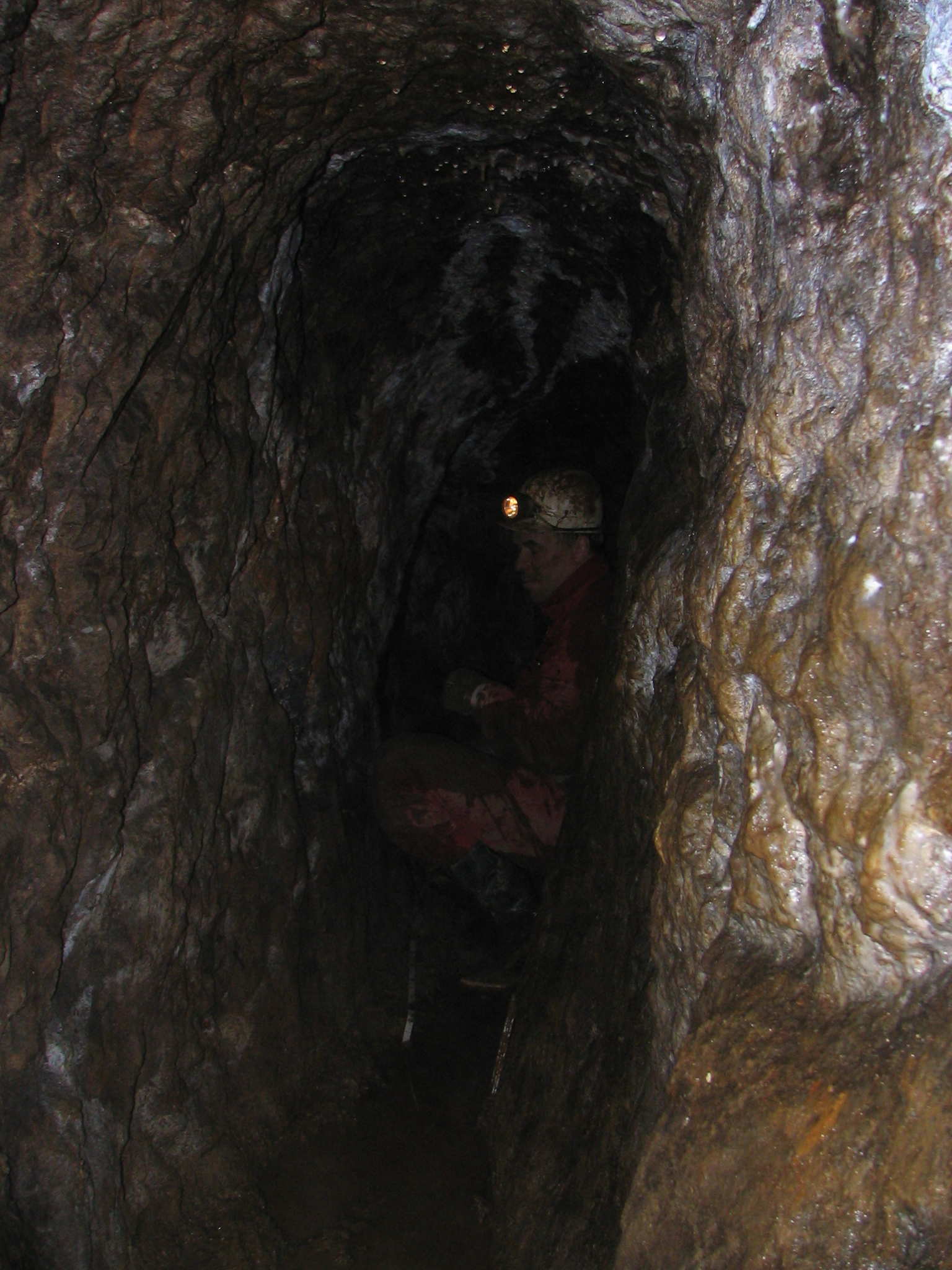
Gallery, 12th to 13th century, Germany

Mining as an industry underwent dramatic changes in medieval Europe. The mining industry in the early Middle Ages was primarily focused on extracting copper and iron. Other precious metals were also used, mainly for gilding or coinage. Initially, many metals were obtained through open-pit mining, and ore was primarily extracted from shallow depths, rather than through deep mine shafts. Around the 14th century, the growing use of weapons, armour, stirrups, and horseshoes greatly increased the demand for iron. Medieval knights, for example, were often laden with up to 100 pounds (45 kg) of plate or chain link armour in addition to swords, lances and other weapons. The overwhelming dependency on iron for military purposes spurred iron production and extraction processes.

The silver crisis of 1465 occurred when all mines had reached depths at which the shafts could no longer be pumped dry with the available technology. Although an increased use of banknotes, credit and copper coins during this period did decrease the value of, and dependence on, precious metals, gold and silver remained vital to the story of medieval mining.

Due to differences in social structure, the increasing extraction of mineral deposits spread from central Europe to England in the mid-sixteenth century. On the continent, mineral deposits belonged to the crown, and this regalian right was stoutly maintained. But in England, royal mining rights were restricted to gold and silver (of which England had virtually no deposits) by a judicial decision of 1568 and a law in 1688. England had iron, zinc, copper, lead, and tin ores. Landlords who owned the base metals and coal under their estates had a strong incentive to extract these metals or lease the deposits and collect royalties from mine operators. English, German, and Dutch capital combined to finance extraction and refining. Hundreds of German technicians and skilled workers were brought over; in 1642, a colony of 4,000 foreigners was mining and smelting copper at Keswick in the northwestern mountains.

Use of water power in the form of water mills was extensive. The water mills were employed to crush ore, raise ore from shafts, and ventilate galleries by powering giant bellows. Black powder was first used in mining in Selmecbánya, Kingdom of Hungary (now Banská Štiavnica, Slovakia) in 1627. Black powder allowed blasting of rock and earth to loosen and reveal ore veins. Blasting was much faster than fire-setting and allowed the mining of previously impenetrable metals and ores. In 1762, one of the world's first mining academies was established in the same town.

The widespread adoption of agricultural innovations such as the iron plowshare, as well as the growing use of metal as a building material, was also a driving force in the tremendous growth of the iron industry during this period. The Spanish often used inventions such as the arrastra to pulverize ore after mining. This device was powered by animals and employed the same principles as grain threshing.

Much of the knowledge of medieval mining techniques comes from books such as Biringuccio's De la pirotechnia and, probably most importantly, from Georg Agricola's De re metallica (1556). These books detail many different mining methods used in German and Saxon mines. A prime issue in medieval mines, which Agricola explains in detail, was the removal of water from mining shafts. As miners dug deeper to access new veins, flooding became a very real obstacle. The mining industry became dramatically more efficient and prosperous with the invention of mechanically- and animal-driven pumps.

=== Africa ===
Iron metallurgy in Africa dates back over four thousand years. Gold became an important commodity for Africa during the trans-Saharan gold trade from the 7th century to the 14th century. Gold was often traded to Mediterranean economies that demanded gold and could supply salt, even though much of Africa was abundant with salt due to the mines and resources in the Sahara. The trade of gold for salt was primarily used to promote trade between different economies. Since the Great Trek in the 19th century, after, gold and diamond mining in Southern Africa has had major political and economic impacts. The Democratic Republic of Congo is the largest producer of diamonds in Africa, with an estimated 12 million carats in 2019. Other types of mining reserves in Africa include cobalt, bauxite, iron ore, coal, and copper.

=== Oceania ===
Gold and coal mining started in Australia and New Zealand in the 19th century. Nickel has become important in the economy of New Caledonia.

In Fiji, in 1934, the Emperor Gold Mining Company Ltd. established operations at Vatukoula, followed in 1935 by the Loloma Gold Mines, N.L., and then by Fiji Mines Development Ltd. (aka Dolphin Mines Ltd.). These developments ushered in a "mining boom", with gold production rising more than a hundred-fold, from 931.4 oz in 1934 to 107,788.5 oz in 1939, an order of magnitude then comparable to the combined output of New Zealand and Australia's eastern states.

=== Americas ===
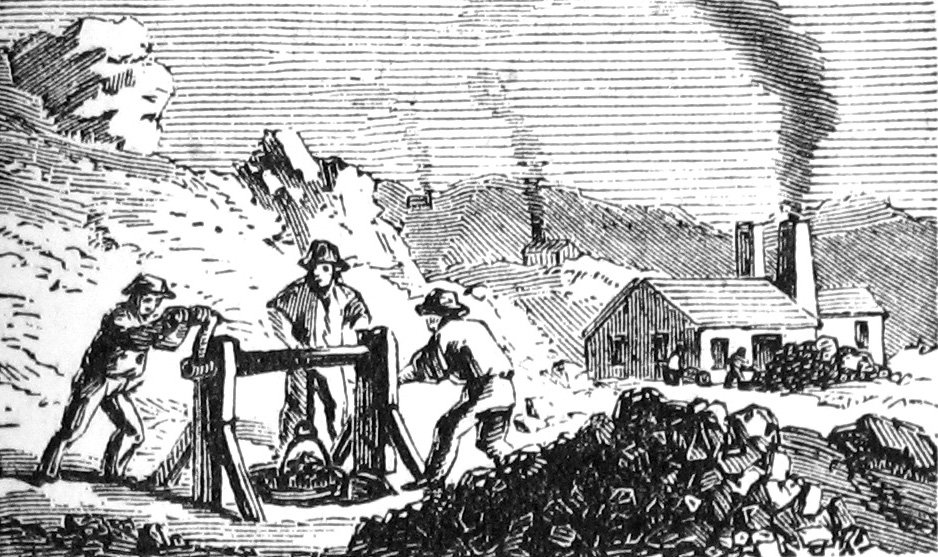
Lead mining in the upper Mississippi River region of the U.S., 1865

During prehistoric times, early Americans mined large quantities of copper along Lake Superior's Keweenaw Peninsula and on nearby Isle Royale; metallic copper remained near the surface into colonial times. Indigenous peoples used Lake Superior copper from at least 5,000 years ago; copper tools, arrowheads, and other artifacts that were part of an extensive native trade-network have been discovered. In addition, obsidian, flint, and other minerals were mined, worked, and traded. Early French explorers who encountered the sites made no use of the metals due to the difficulties of transporting them, but the copper was eventually traded throughout the continent along major river routes.

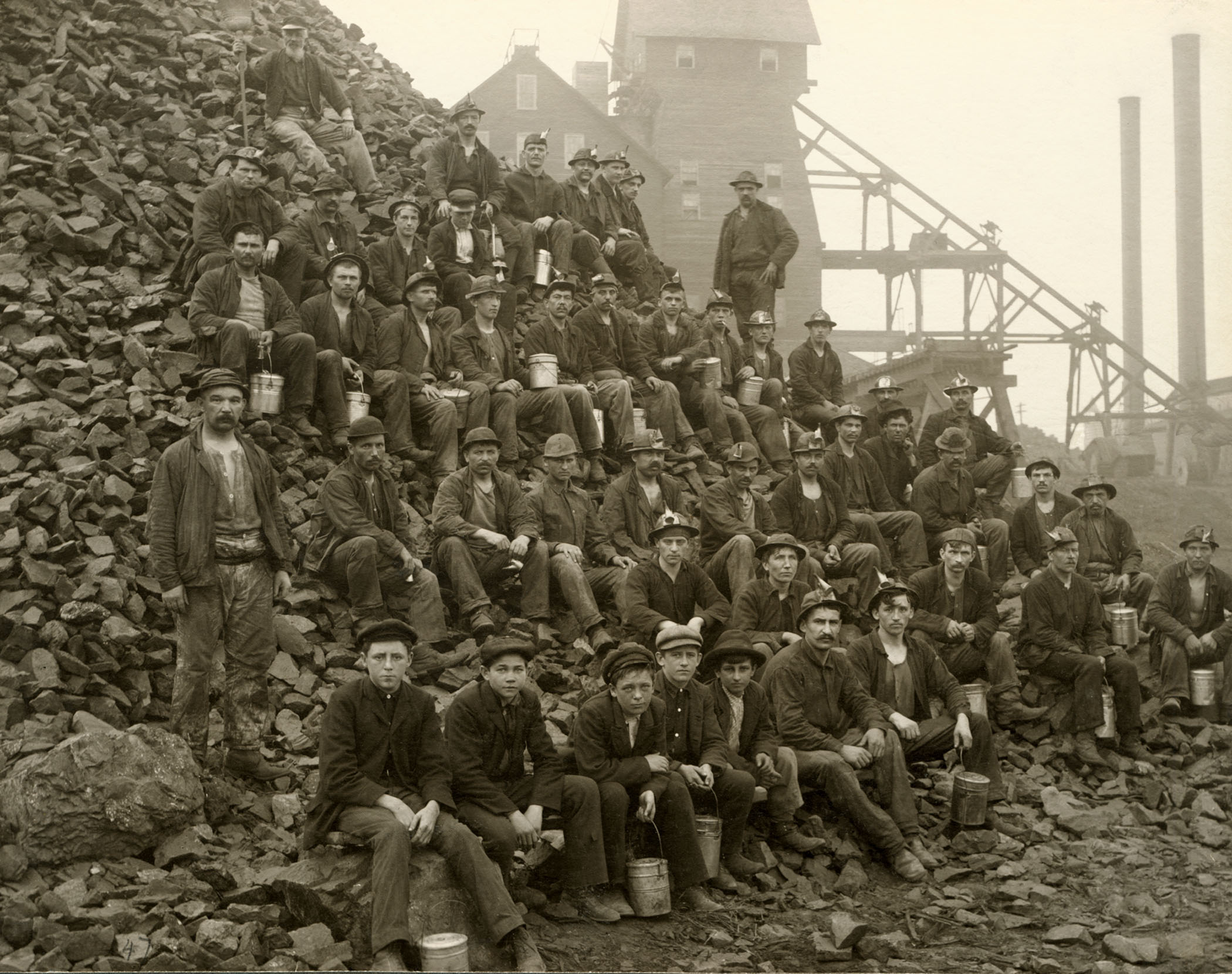
Miners at the Tamarack Mine in Copper Country, Michigan, U.S., in 1905

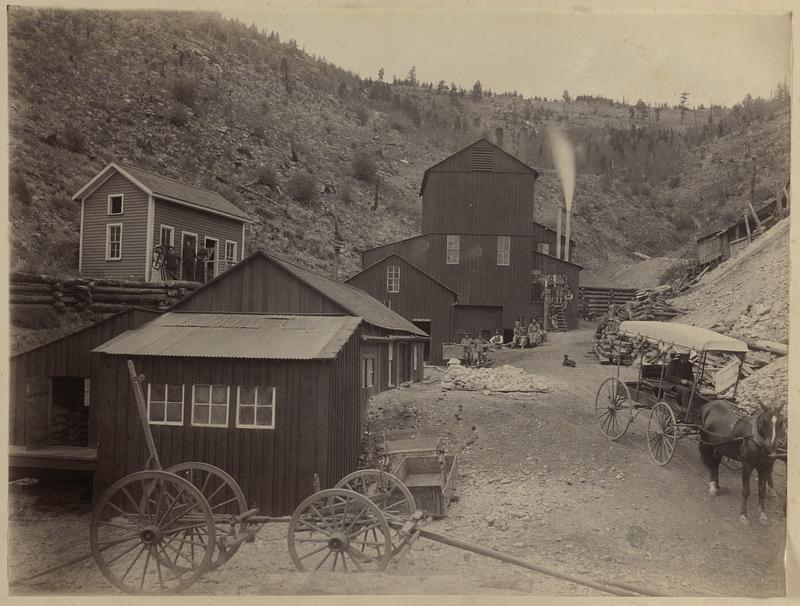
Mining factory, c. 1880–1885. Photographs of the American West, Boston Public Library

In the early colonial history of the Americas, "native gold and silver was quickly expropriated and sent back to Spain in fleets of gold- and silver-laden galleons", the gold and silver originating mostly from mines in Central and South America. Turquoise dated at 700 AD was mined in pre-Columbian America; in the Cerillos Mining District in New Mexico, an estimate of "about 15,000 tons of rock had been removed from Mt. Chalchihuitl using stone tools before 1700."

In 1727 Louis Denys (Denis) (1675–1741), sieur de La Ronde – brother of Simon-Pierre Denys de Bonaventure and the son-in-law of René Chartier – took command of Fort La Pointe at Chequamegon Bay; where natives informed him of an island of copper. La Ronde obtained permission from the French crown to operate mines in 1733, becoming "the first practical miner on Lake Superior"; seven years later, mining was halted by an outbreak between Sioux and Chippewa tribes.

Mining in the United States became widespread in the 19th century, and the United States Congress passed the General Mining Act of 1872 to encourage mining of federal lands. As with the California Gold Rush in the mid-19th century, mining for minerals and precious metals, along with ranching, became a driving factor in the U.S. Westward Expansion to the Pacific coast. With the exploration of the West, mining camps sprang up and "expressed a distinctive spirit, an enduring legacy to the new nation"; Gold Rushers would experience the same problems as the Land Rushers of the transient West that preceded them. Aided by railroads, many people traveled West for work opportunities in mining. Western cities such as Denver and Sacramento originated as mining towns.

When new areas were explored, it was usually the gold (placer and then lode) and then silver that were taken into possession and extracted first. Other metals would often wait for railroads or canals, as coarse gold dust and nuggets do not require smelting and are easy to identify and transport.

=== Modernity ===
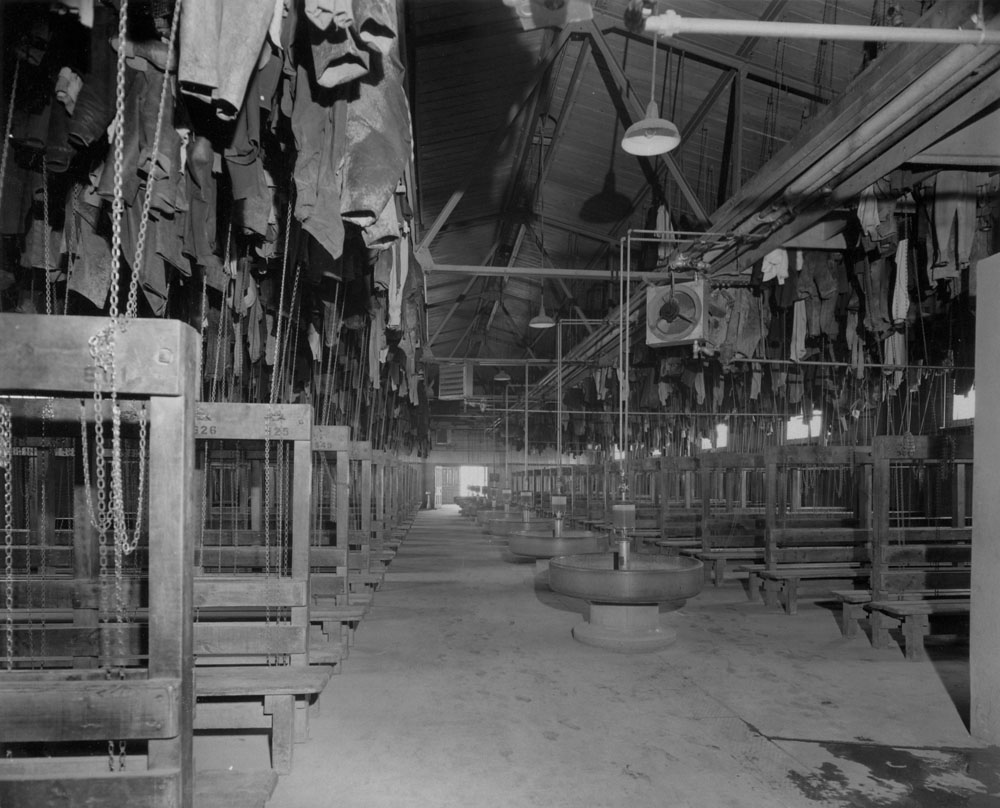
View showing miners' clothes suspended by pulleys, also wash basins and ventilation system, Kirkland Lake, Ontario, 1936

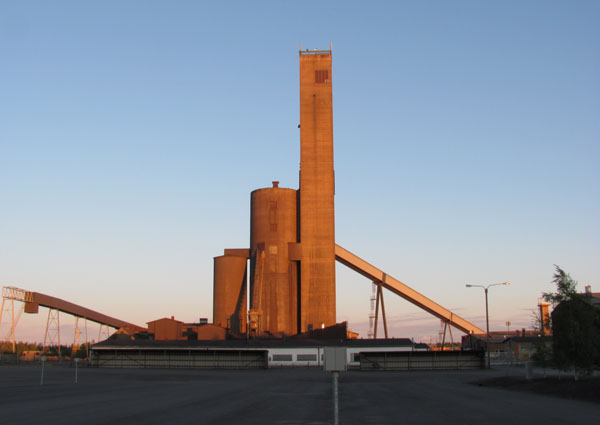
The Pyhäsalmi Mine, a metal mine in Pyhäjärvi, Finland

In the early 20th century, the gold and silver rush to the western United States also stimulated mining for coal as well as base metals such as copper, lead, and iron. Areas in modern Montana, Utah, Arizona, and later Alaska became major suppliers of copper to the world, which was increasingly in demand for electrical and household goods. Canada's mining industry grew more slowly than did the United States due to limitations in transportation, capital, and U.S. competition; Ontario was the major producer of the early 20th century with nickel, copper, and gold.

Meanwhile, Australia experienced the Australian gold rushes and by the 1850s was producing 40% of the world's gold, followed by the establishment of large mines such as the Mount Morgan Mine, which ran for nearly a hundred years, Broken Hill ore deposit (one of the largest zinc-lead ore deposits), and the iron ore mines at Iron Knob. After declines in production, another boom in mining occurred in the 1960s. In the early 21st century, Australia remains a major world mineral producer.

As the 21st century begins, a globalized mining industry dominated by large multinational corporations has emerged. Peak minerals and environmental impacts have also become a concern. Different elements, particularly rare-earth minerals, have begun to increase in demand as a result of new technologies.

In 2023, 8.5 billion metric tons of coal were extracted from the Earth's crust. However, as the global economy transitions away from fossil fuels and toward a more sustainable future, the demand for metals is set to skyrocket. Between 2022 and 2050, an estimated 7 billion metric tons of metals will need to be extracted. Steel will account for the largest portion of this total at 5 billion tons, followed by aluminum at 950 million tons, copper at 650 million tons, graphite at 170 million tons, nickel at 100 million tons, and other metals. Notably, the energy expenditure required to extract these metals will soon surpass that of coal mining, highlighting the growing importance of sustainable metal extraction practices.

== Mine development and life cycle ==
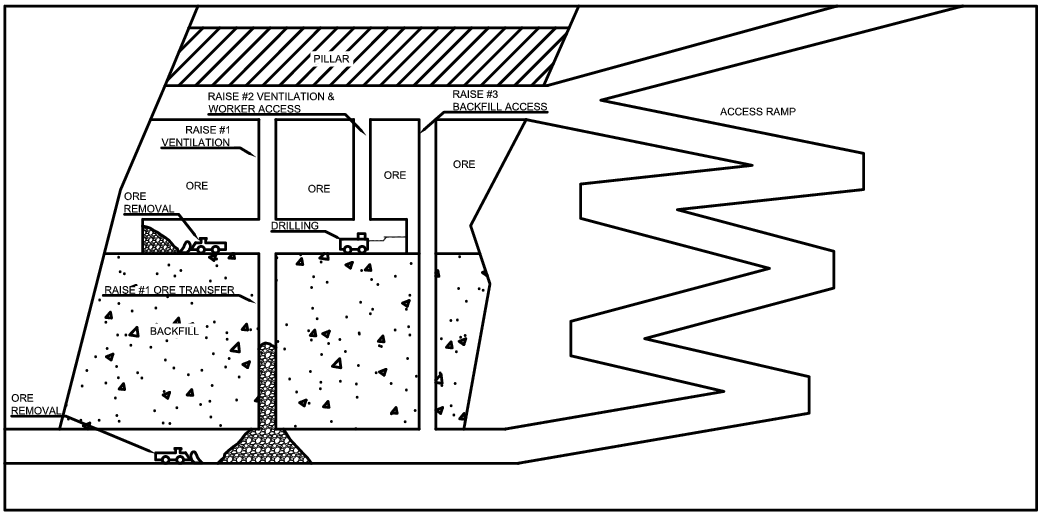
Schematic of a cut and fill mining operation in hard rock

The process of mining, from the discovery of an ore body through mineral extraction to the final return of the land to its natural state, consists of several distinct steps. The first is the discovery of the ore body, carried out through prospecting or exploration to identify and define its extent, location, and value. This leads to a mathematical resource estimation of the deposit's size and grade.

This estimation is used to conduct a pre-feasibility study to determine the theoretical economics of the ore deposit. This identifies early on whether further investment in estimation and engineering studies is warranted and highlights key risks and areas for further work. The next step is to conduct a feasibility study to evaluate the project's financial viability, technical and financial risks, and robustness. Commodity price volatility tends to reduce the feasibility of mining.

This is when the mining company decides whether to develop the mine or walk away from the project. This includes mine planning to evaluate the economically recoverable portion of the deposit, the metallurgy and ore recoverability, marketability and payability of the ore concentrates, engineering concerns, milling and infrastructure costs, finance and equity requirements, and an analysis of the proposed mine from the initial excavation all the way through to reclamation. The proportion of a deposit that is economically recoverable is dependent on the enrichment factor of the ore in the area.

To gain access to the mineral deposit within an area, it is often necessary to mine through or remove waste material, which is not of immediate interest to the miner. The total movement of ore and waste constitutes the mining process. Often, more waste than ore is mined during the life of a mine, depending on the nature and location of the ore body. Waste removal and placement are major costs to the mining operator, so a detailed characterization of the waste material forms an essential part of the geological exploration program for a mining operation.

Once the analysis determines that a given ore body is worth recovering, development begins to provide access to it. The mine buildings and processing plants are built, and any necessary equipment is obtained. The operation of the mine to recover the ore begins and continues as long as the company operating the mine finds it economical to do so. Once all the ore that the mine can produce profitably is recovered, reclamation can begin, to make the land used by the mine suitable for future use.

Technical and economic challenges notwithstanding, successful mine development must also address human factors. Working conditions are important to success, especially with respect to exposure to dust, radiation, noise, explosive hazards, and vibration, as well as illumination standards. Mining must increasingly address environmental and community impacts, including psychological and sociological dimensions. Thus, mining educator Frank T. M. White (1909–1971) broadened the focus to the "total environment of mining", including reference to community development around mining, and how mining is portrayed to an urban society, which depends on the industry, although seemingly unaware of this dependency. He stated, "[I]n the past, mining engineers have not been called upon to study the psychological, sociological, and personal problems of their own industry – aspects that nowadays are assuming tremendous importance. The mining engineer must rapidly expand his knowledge and his influence into these newer fields."

== Techniques ==
Mining techniques can be divided into two common excavation types: surface mining and sub-surface (underground) mining. Modern surface mining (also called open pit) is much more common and produces, for example, 85% of minerals (excluding petroleum and natural gas) in the United States, including 98% of metallic ores.

Targets are divided into two general categories of materials: placer deposits, consisting of valuable minerals contained within river gravels, beach sands, and other unconsolidated materials; and lode deposits, where valuable minerals are found in veins, in layers, or in mineral grains generally distributed throughout a mass of actual rock. Both types of ore deposit, placer or lode, are mined by both surface and underground methods.

Some mining, including much of the rare earth element and uranium mining, is done by less common methods, such as in-situ leaching. This technique involves neither digging at the surface nor underground. The extraction of target minerals by this technique requires that they be soluble, e.g., potash, potassium chloride, sodium chloride, sodium sulfate, which dissolve in water. Some minerals, such as copper minerals and uranium oxide, require acid or carbonate solutions to dissolve.

=== Explosives in mining ===
Explosives have been used in surface mining and sub-surface mining to blast out rock and ore intended for processing. The most common explosive used in mining is ammonium nitrate. Between 1870 and 1920, in Queensland, Australia, an increase in mining accidents led to more safety measures surrounding the use of explosives for mining. In the United States of America, between 1990 and 1999, about 22.3 billion kilograms of explosives were used in mining quarrying and other industries; Moreover "coal mining used 66.4%, nonmetal mining and quarrying 13.5%, metal mining 10.4%, construction 7.1%, and all other users 2.6%".

=== Artisanal ===
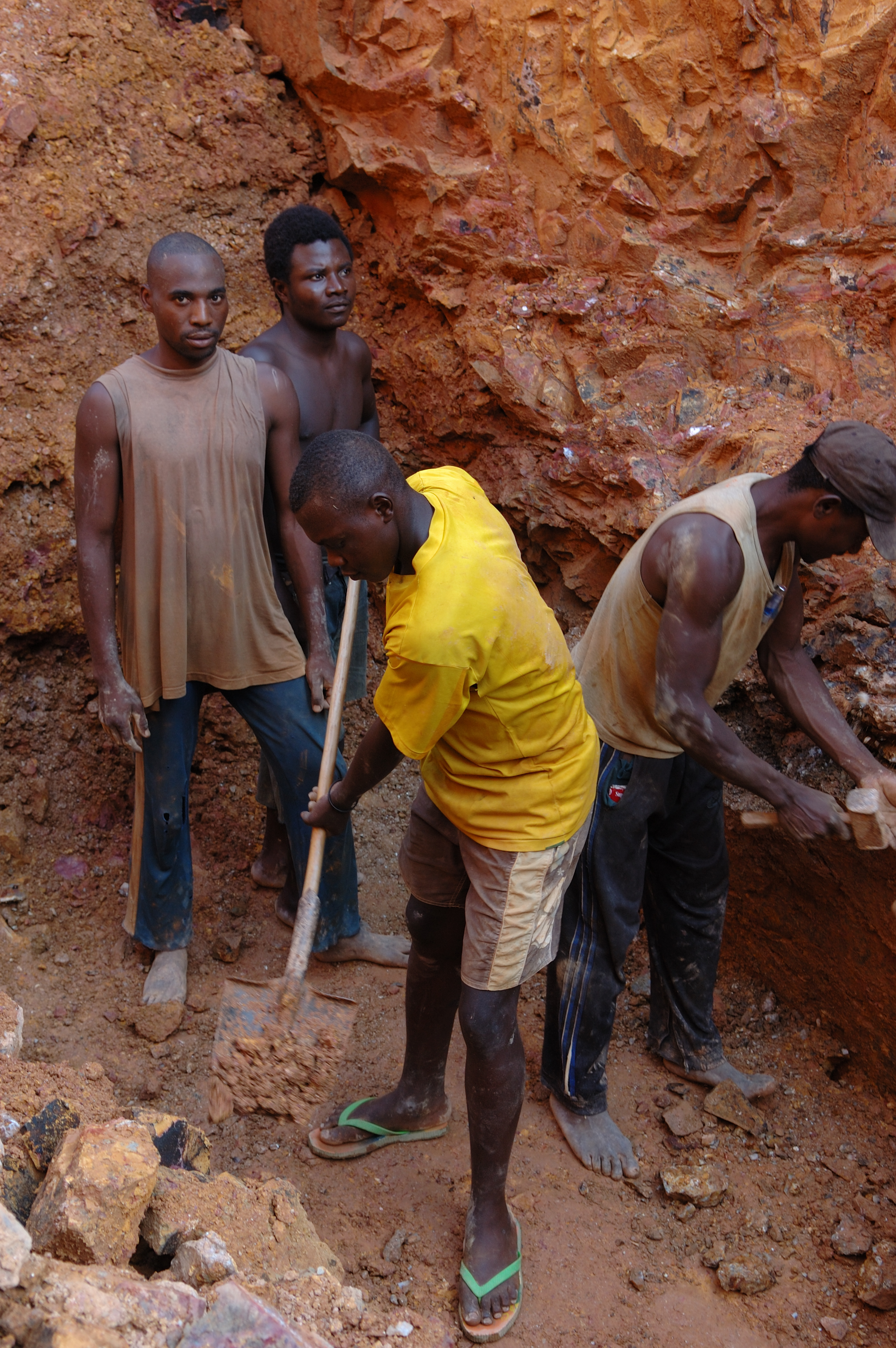
Artisanal wolframite mining in Kailo Territory, DRC

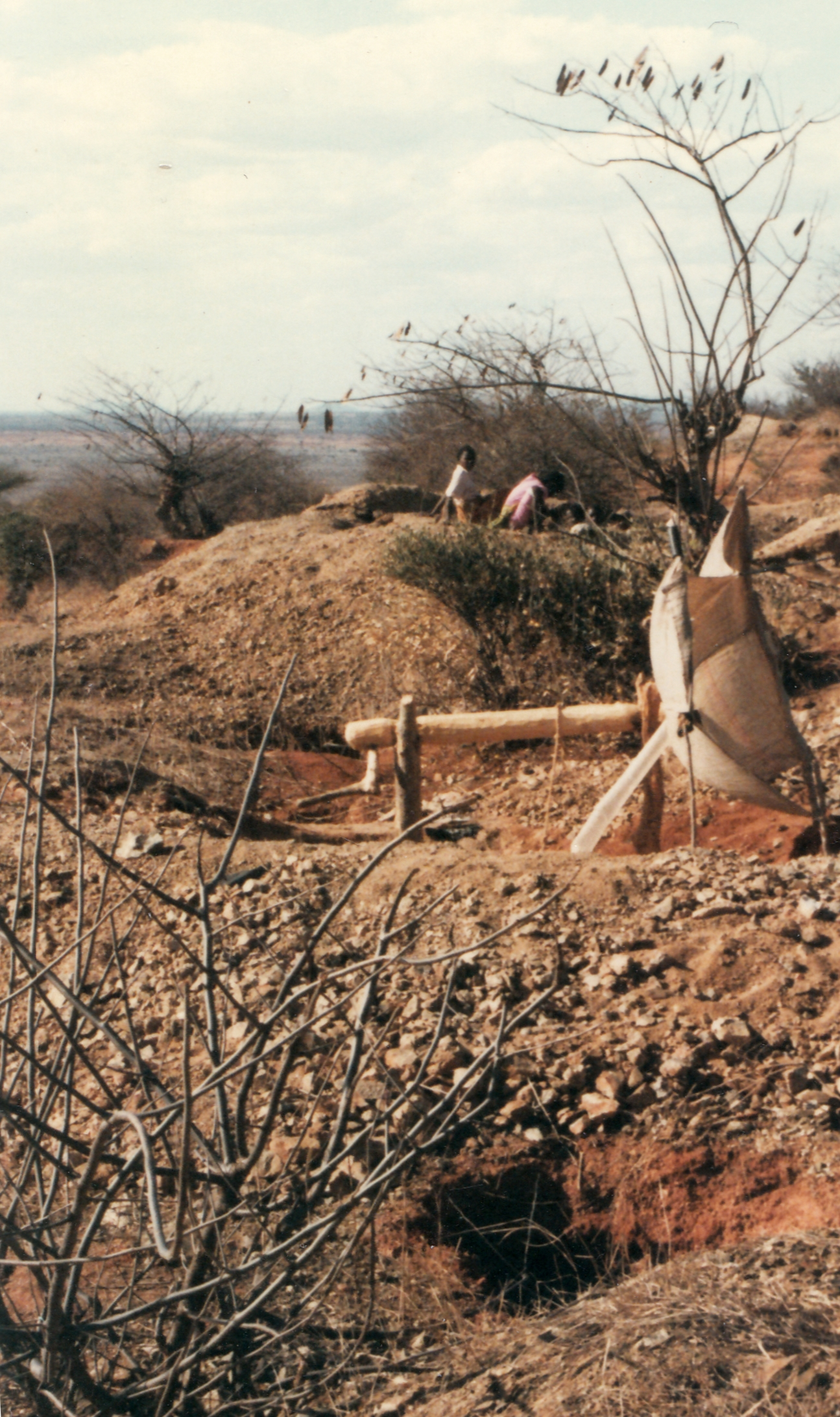
Artisanal gold mines near Dodoma, Tanzania. Makeshift sails lead fresh air underground.

Artisanal and small-scale mining (ASM) is a blanket term for a wide variety of types of small mining that range from manual subsistence mining using simple tools to vocational mining that is semi-mechanised involving light machinery such as generators, water pumps, and small motorized mills, through to organised mechanised mining that employs industrial equipment such as excavators and bulldozers. ASM involves miners who may or may not be officially employed. Although there can be large numbers of miners working at a mining site, they typically work in small teams according to a customary system of organisation that includes a manager, skilled and unskilled labour.

While the terms are generally used interchangeably or synonymously, by definition 'artisanal mining' refers to purely manual labor while 'small-scale mining' typically involves larger operations and some use of mechanical or industrial tools. While there is no completely coherent definition for ASM, artisanal mining generally includes miners who are not officially employed by a mining company and use their own resources to mine. As such, they are part of an informal economy. ASM also includes, in small-scale mining, enterprises or individuals that employ workers for mining, but who generally still use similar manually-intensive methods as artisanal miners (such as working with hand tools). In addition, ASM can be characterized as distinct from large-scale mining (LSM) by less efficient extraction of pure minerals from the ore, lower wages, decreased occupational safety, benefits, and health standards for miners, and a lack of environmental protection measures. ASM has on occasion been evaluated positively in terms of negligible capital outflow, the employment it generates and the connection it has with local society and economy in contrast with the enclave economies of some LSM.

Artisanal miners often undertake the activity of mining seasonally. For example, crops are planted in the rainy season, and mining is pursued in the dry season. However, they also frequently travel to mining areas and work year-round. There are four broad types of ASM:

1. Permanent artisanal mining
2. Seasonal (annually migrating during idle agriculture periods)
3. Rush-type (massive migration, pulled often by commodity price jumps)
4. Shock-push (poverty-driven, following conflict or natural disasters).

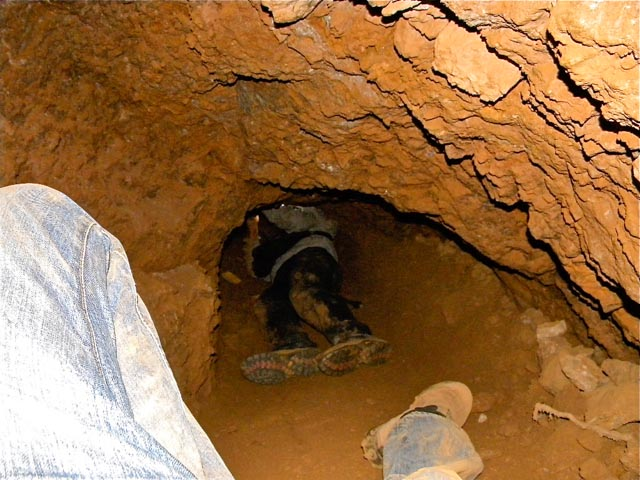
Interior of an artisanal mine near Low's Creek, Mpumalanga Province, South Africa. The human figures, exploring this mine, show the scale of tunnels driven entirely with hand tools (two-kilogram (4.4 lb) hammer and hand-forged scrap-steel chisel).

ASM is an important socio-economic sector for the rural poor in many developing nations, many of whom have few other options for supporting their families. Over 90% of the world's mining workforce are engaged in ASM, with an estimated 40.5 million people directly engaged in ASM, from over 80 countries in the global south. More than 150 million people indirectly depend on ASM for their livelihood. 70–80% of small-scale miners are informal, and approximately 30% are women, although this ranges in certain countries and commodities from 5% to 80%.

=== Surface ===
Surface mining is done by removing surface vegetation, dirt, and bedrock to reach buried ore deposits. Techniques of surface mining include: open-pit mining, which is the recovery of materials from an open pit in the ground; quarrying, identical to open-pit mining except that it refers to sand, stone and clay; strip mining, which consists of stripping surface layers off to reveal ore underneath; and mountaintop removal, commonly associated with coal mining, which involves taking the top of a mountain off to reach ore deposits at depth. Most placer deposits, because they are shallowly buried, are mined by surface methods. Finally, landfill mining involves excavating and processing landfill sites. Landfill mining has been thought of as a long-term solution to methane emissions and local pollution.

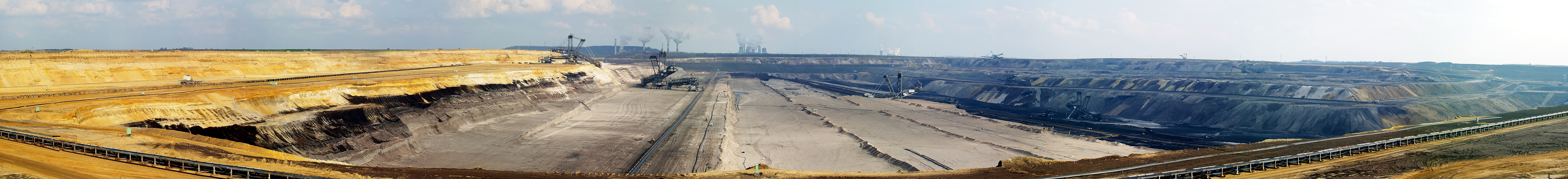
Garzweiler surface mine, Germany

=== High wall ===
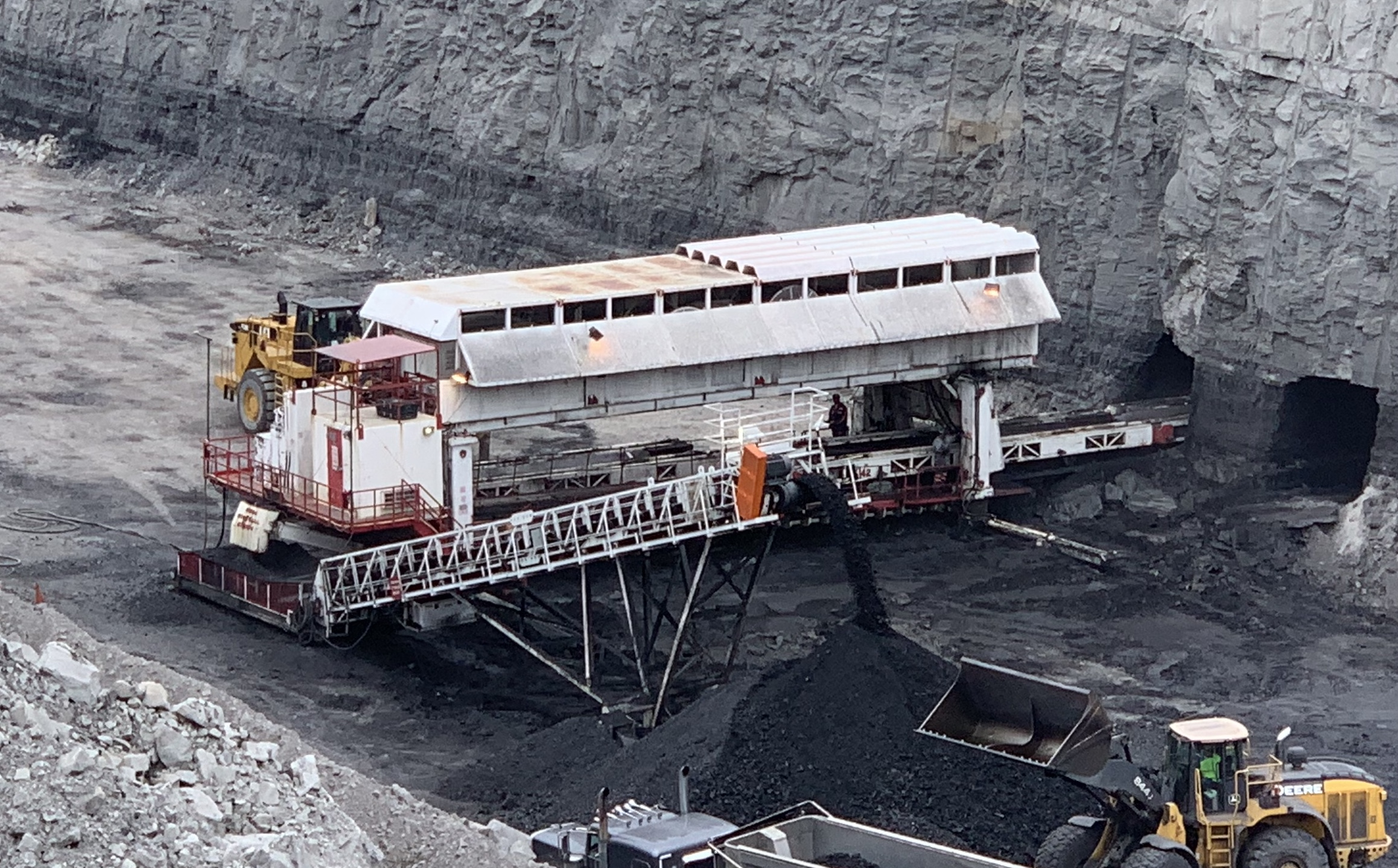
Coalburg Seam highwall mining at ADDCAR 16 Logan County WV

High-wall mining, which evolved from auger mining, is another form of surface mining. In high wall mining, the remaining part of a coal seam previously exploited by other surface-mining techniques has too much overburden to be removed but can still be profitably exploited from the side of the artificial cliff made by previous mining. A typical cycle alternates sumping, which undercuts the seam, and shearing, which raises and lowers the cutter-head boom to cut the entire height of the coal seam. As the coal recovery cycle continues, the cutter head is progressively advanced further into the coal seam. High wall mining can produce thousands of tons of coal in contour-strip operations with narrow benches, previously mined areas, trench mine applications, and steep-dip seams.

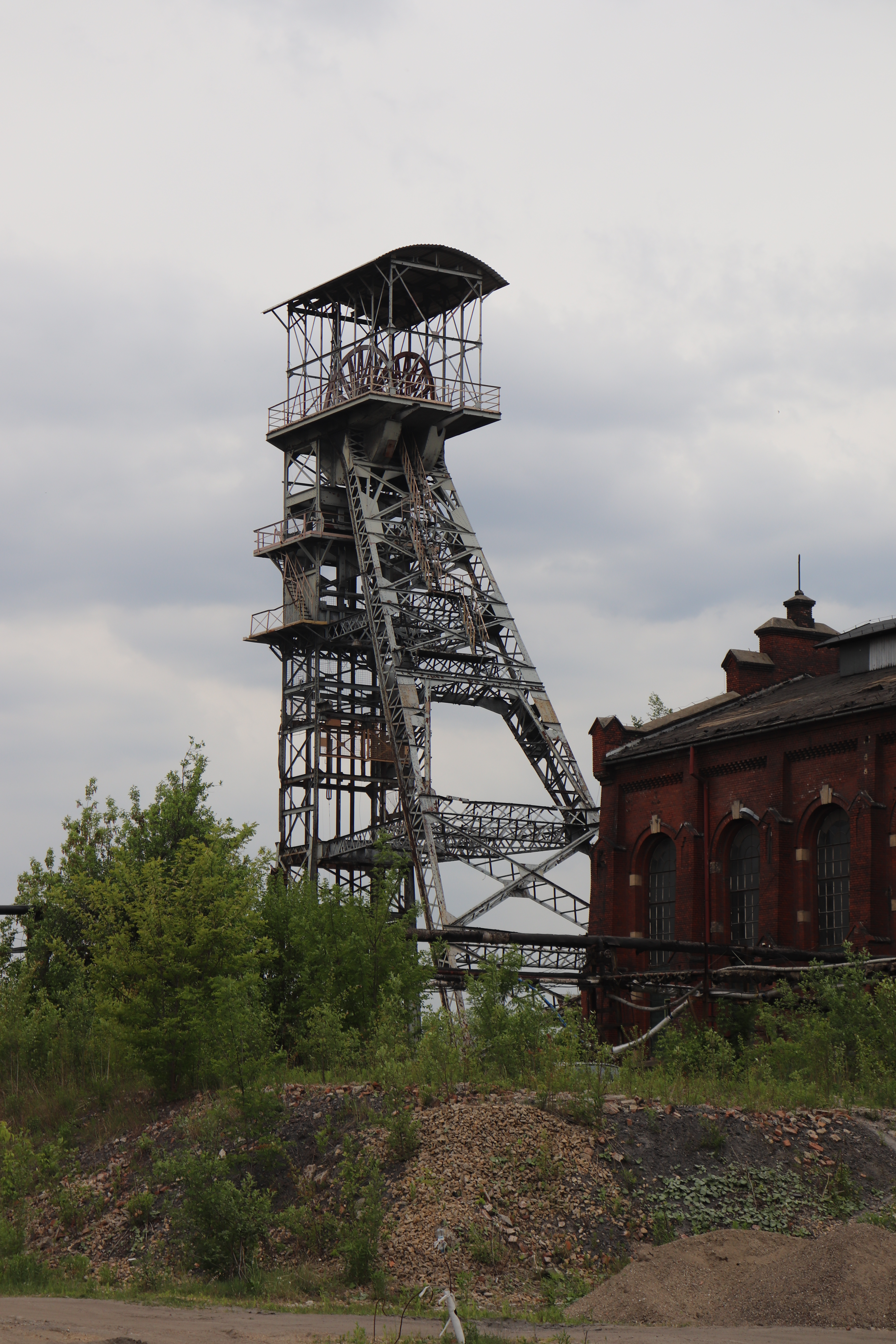
Mysłowice coal mine shaft tower, Upper Silesian Coal Basin

=== Underground mining ===
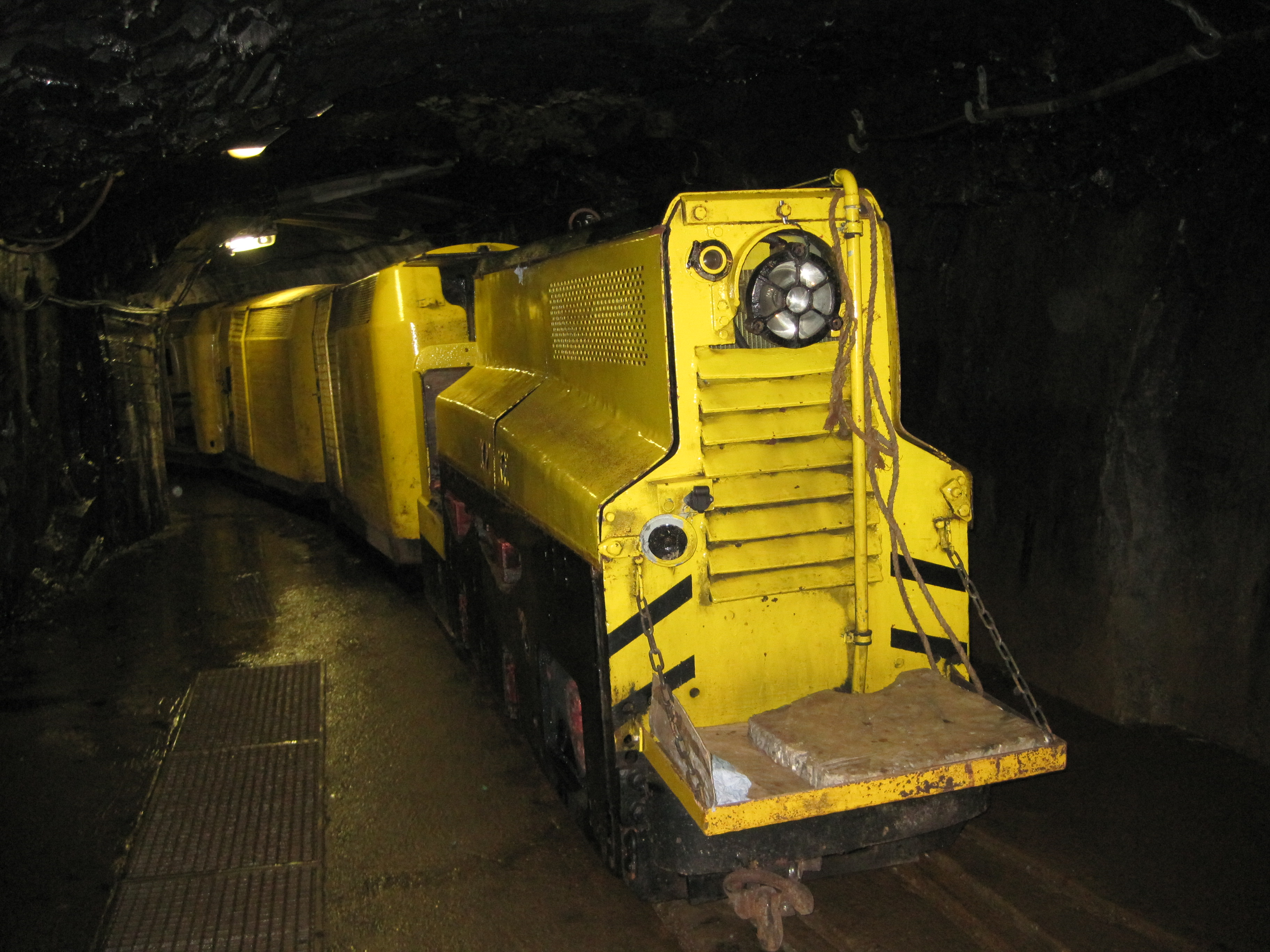
Mantrip used for transporting miners within an underground mine

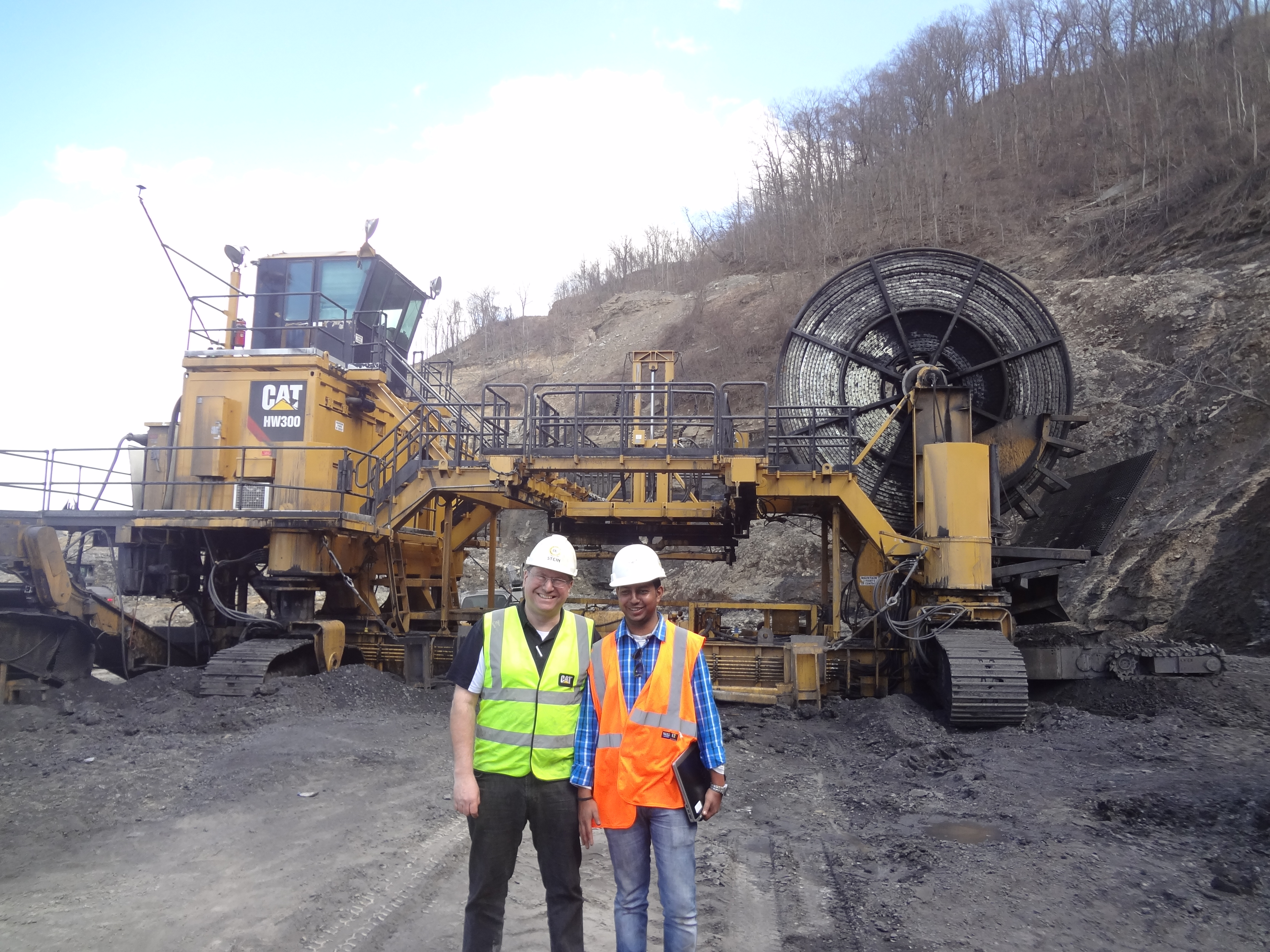
Caterpillar Highwall Miner HW300 – Technology Bridging Underground and Open Pit Mining

Subsurface mining involves digging tunnels or shafts into the earth to access buried ore deposits. Ore for processing and waste rock for disposal are brought to the surface through the tunnels and shafts. Subsurface mining can be classified by the type of access shafts used, the extraction method, or the technique for reaching the mineral deposit. Drift mining uses horizontal access tunnels, slope mining uses diagonally sloping access shafts, and shaft mining uses vertical access shafts. Mining in hard and soft rock formations requires different techniques.

Other methods include shrinkage stope mining, which is mining upward, creating a sloping underground room, long wall mining, which is grinding a long ore surface underground, and room and pillar mining, which is removing ore from rooms while leaving pillars in place to support the roof of the room. Room-and-pillar mining often leads to retreat mining, in which supporting pillars are removed as miners retreat, allowing the room to cave in and thereby loosening more ore. Additional sub-surface mining methods include hard rock mining, borehole mining, drift and fill mining, long hole slope mining, sub-level caving, and block caving.

== Machines ==
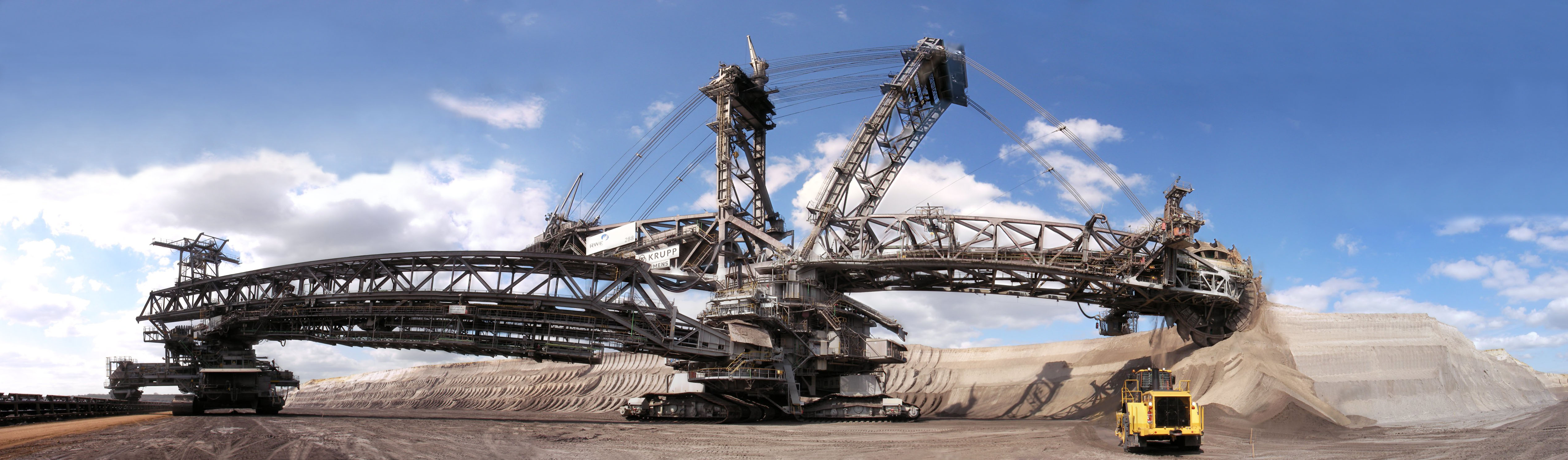
The Bagger 288 is a bucket-wheel excavator used in strip mining. It is also one of the largest land vehicles of all time.

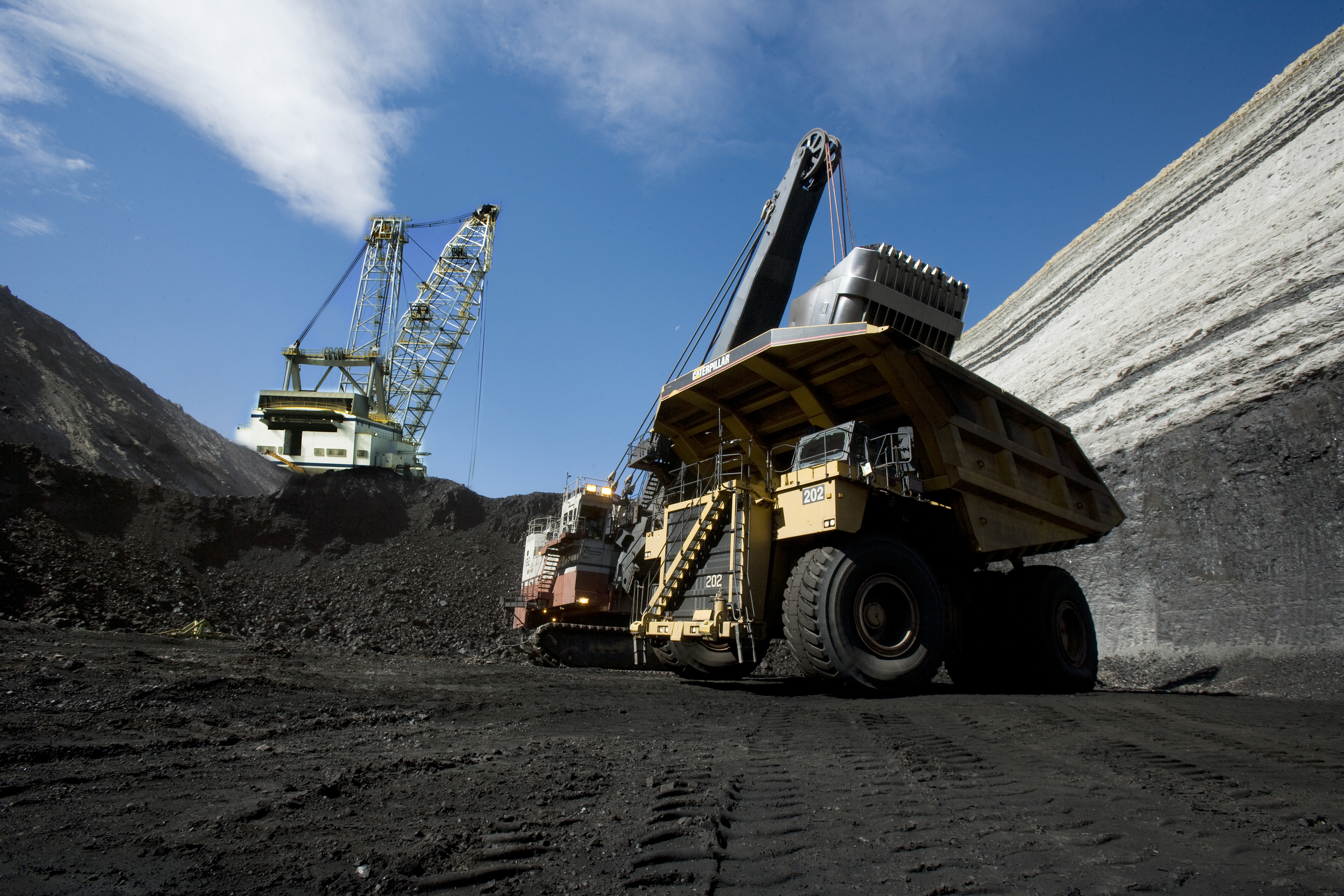
A Bucyrus Erie 2570 dragline and CAT 797 haul truck at the North Antelope Rochelle opencut coal mine

Heavy machinery is used in mining to explore and develop sites, to remove and stockpile overburden, to break and remove rocks of various hardness and toughness, to process the ore, and to carry out reclamation projects after the mine is closed. Bulldozers, drills, explosives, and trucks are all necessary for excavating the land. In the case of placer mining, unconsolidated gravel, or alluvium, is fed into machinery consisting of a hopper and a shaking screen or trommel, which frees the desired minerals from the waste gravel. The minerals are then concentrated using sluices or jigs.

Large drills are used to sink shafts, excavate stopes, and obtain samples for analysis, and to extract natural gas (see Fracking). Trams are used to transport miners, minerals, and waste. Lifts carry miners into and out of mines, move rock and ore out, and move machinery in and out of underground mines. Huge trucks, shovels, and cranes are employed in surface mining to move large quantities of overburden and ore. Processing plants use large crushers, mills, reactors, roasters, and other equipment to consolidate the mineral-rich material and extract the desired compounds and metals from the ore.

== Processing ==
Once the mineral is extracted, it is often then processed. The science of extractive metallurgy is a specialized branch of metallurgy that studies the extraction of valuable metals from ores, particularly by chemical or mechanical means.

Mineral processing (or mineral dressing) is a specialized area in the science of metallurgy that studies the mechanical means of crushing, grinding, and washing that enable the separation (extractive metallurgy) of valuable metals or minerals from their gangue (waste material). Processing of placer ore material consists of gravity-based separation methods, such as Sluice boxes. Only minor shaking or washing may be necessary to disaggregate (unclump) the sands or gravels before processing. Processing ore from a lode mine, whether surface or subsurface, requires crushing and pulverizing the ore before extraction of the valuable minerals begins. After the ore is crushed, the valuable minerals are recovered using one or a combination of mechanical and chemical techniques.

Since most metals are present in ores as oxides or sulfides, the metal needs to be reduced to its metallic form. This can be accomplished through chemical means such as smelting or through electrolytic reduction, as in the case of aluminium. Geometallurgy combines the geologic sciences with extractive metallurgy and mining.

In 2018, led by Chemistry and Biochemistry professor Bradley D. Smith, University of Notre Dame researchers "invented a new class of molecules whose shape and size enable them to capture and contain precious metal ions," reported in a study published by the Journal of the American Chemical Society. The new method "converts gold-containing ore into chloroauric acid and extracts it using an industrial solvent. The container molecules are able to selectively separate the gold from the solvent without the use of water stripping." The newly developed molecules can eliminate water stripping, whereas mining traditionally "relies on a 125-year-old method that treats gold-containing ore with large quantities of poisonous sodium cyanide... this new process has a milder environmental impact and that, besides gold, it can be used for capturing other metals such as platinum and palladium," and could also be used in urban mining processes that remove precious metals from wastewater streams.

== Industry ==
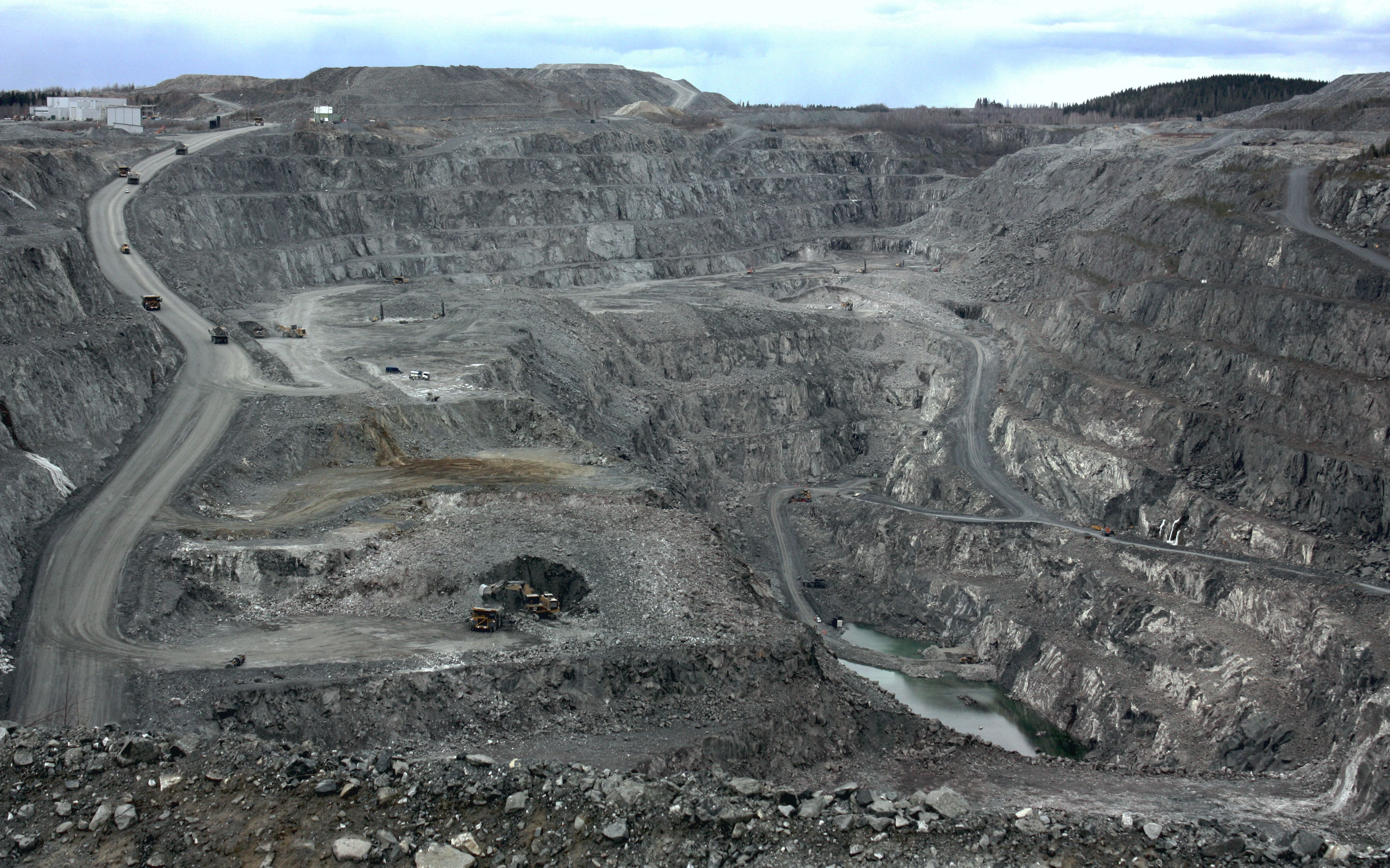
The Särkijärvi pit of the apatite mine in Siilinjärvi, Finland

Mining exists in many countries. London is the headquarters of Anglo American. Melbourne is the headquarters of the world's two largest mining companies BHP and Rio Tinto. The US mining industry is also large and dominated by extraction of coal and other nonmetal minerals (e.g., rock and sand), and various regulations have worked to reduce the significance of mining in the United States. In 2007, the total market capitalization of mining companies was reported at US$962 billion, which compares to a total global market cap of publicly traded companies of about US$50 trillion in 2007. In 2002, Chile and Peru were reportedly the major mining countries of South America. The mineral industry of Africa includes the mining of various minerals; it produces relatively little of the industrial metals copper, lead, and zinc, but according to one estimate has as a percent of world reserves 40% of gold, 60% of cobalt, and 90% of the world's platinum group metals. Mining in India is a significant part of that country's economy. In the developed world, mining in Australia, with BHP founded and headquartered in the country, and mining in Canada, are particularly significant. For rare earth minerals mining, China reportedly controlled 95% of production in 2013.

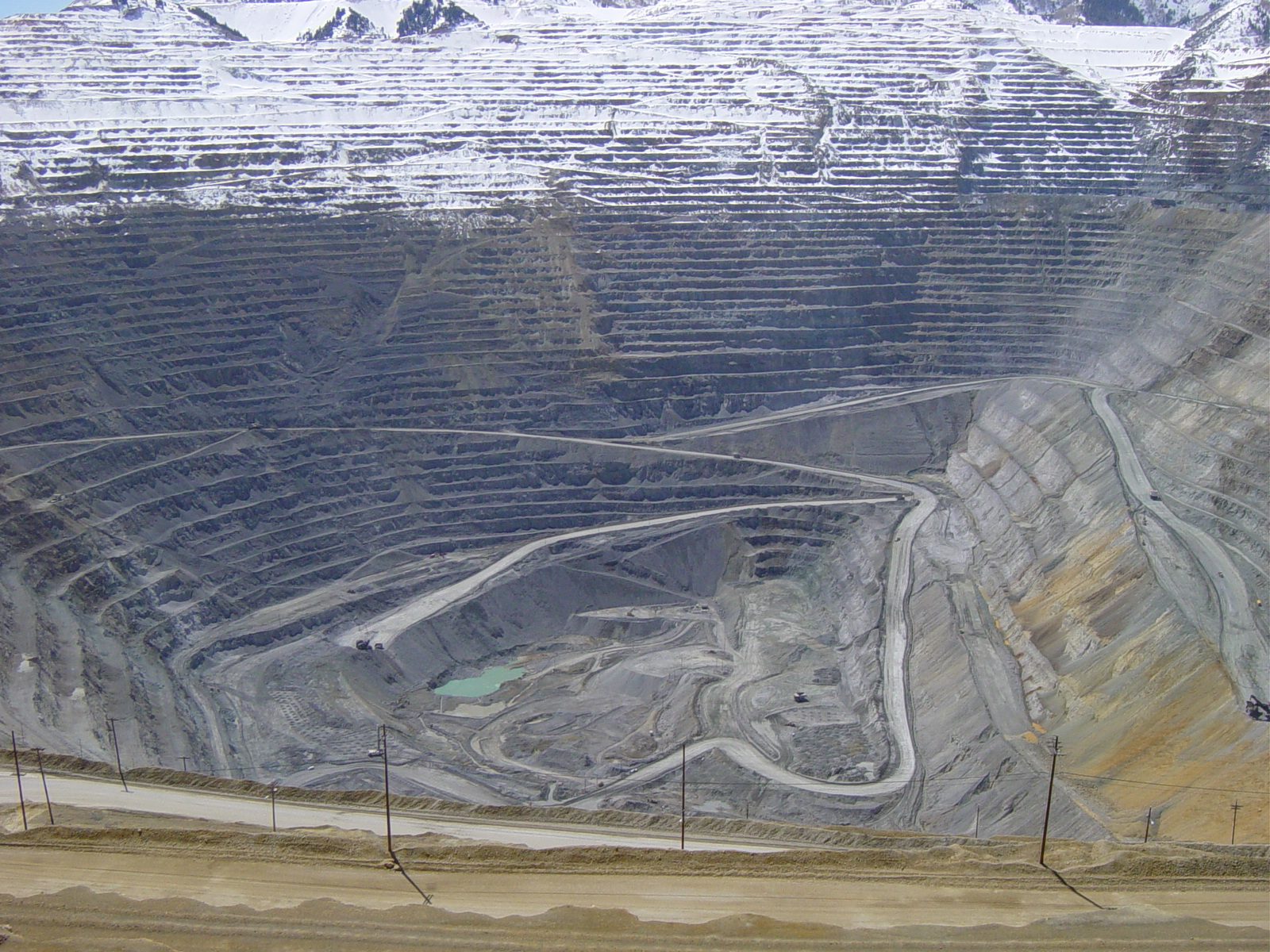
The Bingham Canyon Mine of Rio Tinto's subsidiary, Kennecott Utah Copper

While individual entrepreneurs or small businesses can conduct exploration and mining, most modern-day mines are large enterprises that require substantial capital to establish. Consequently, the mining sector of the industry is dominated by large, often multinational companies, most of which are publicly listed. It can be argued that what is referred to as the 'mining industry' comprises two sectors: one specializing in the exploration of new resources and the other in mining those resources. The exploration sector is typically made up of individuals and small mineral resource companies, called "juniors", that depend on venture capital. The mining sector comprises large multinational companies that are sustained by production from their operations. Various other industries, such as equipment manufacturing, environmental testing, and metallurgical analysis, rely on and support the mining industry worldwide. Canadian stock exchanges have a particular focus on mining companies, particularly junior exploration companies, through Toronto's TSX Venture Exchange; Canadian companies raise capital on these exchanges and then invest the money in exploration globally. Some have argued that below juniors, there exists a substantial sector of illegitimate companies primarily focused on manipulating stock prices.

Mining operations can be grouped into five major categories based on the resources they exploit. These are oil and gas extraction, coal mining, metal ore mining, nonmetallic mineral mining and quarrying, and mining support activities. Of all of these categories, oil and gas extraction remains one of the largest in terms of its global economic importance. Prospecting potential mining sites, a vital area of concern for the mining industry, is now done using sophisticated new technologies such as seismic prospecting and remote-sensing satellites. Mining is heavily affected by the prices of the commodity minerals, which are often volatile. The 2000s commodities boom ("commodities supercycle") increased commodity prices, driving aggressive mining. In addition, the price of gold increased dramatically in the 2000s, which increased gold mining; for example, one study found that conversion of forest in the Amazon increased six-fold from the period 2003–2006 (292 ha/yr) to the period 2006–2009 (1,915 ha/yr), largely due to artisanal mining.

=== Corporate classifications ===
Mining companies can be classified based on their size and financial capabilities:

- Major companies are considered to have an adjusted annual mining-related revenue of more than US$500 million, with the financial capability to develop a major mine on its own.
- Intermediate companies have at least $50 million in annual revenue but less than $500 million.
- Junior companies rely on equity financing as their principal means of funding exploration. Juniors are mainly pure exploration companies, but may also produce minimally, and do not have a revenue exceeding US$50 million.

Regarding their valuation and stock market characteristics, see Valuation (finance) § Valuation of mining projects.

=== World Bank ===
World Bank logo

The World Bank has been involved in mining since 1955, mainly through grants from its International Bank for Reconstruction and Development, with the Bank's Multilateral Investment Guarantee Agency offering political risk insurance. Between 1955 and 1990 it provided about $2 billion to fifty mining projects, broadly categorized as reform and rehabilitation, greenfield mine construction, mineral processing, technical assistance, and engineering. These projects have been criticized, particularly the Ferro Carajas project of Brazil, begun in 1981. The World Bank established mining codes intended to increase foreign investment; in 1988, it solicited feedback from 45 mining companies on how to increase their involvement.

In 1992, the World Bank began to push for privatization of government-owned mining companies with a new set of codes, beginning with its report The Strategy for African Mining. In 1997, Latin America's largest miner Companhia Vale do Rio Doce (CVRD) was privatized. These and other developments, such as the Philippines 1995 Mining Act, led the bank to publish a third report (Assistance for Minerals Sector Development and Reform in Member Countries), which endorsed mandatory environmental impact assessments and attention to the concerns of the local population. The codes based on this report are influential in the legislation of developing nations. The new codes are intended to encourage development through tax holidays, zero customs duties, reduced income taxes, and related measures. The results of these codes were analyzed by a group from the University of Quebec, which concluded that the codes promote foreign investment but "fall very short of permitting sustainable development". The observed negative correlation between natural resources and economic development is known as the resource curse.

== Safety ==
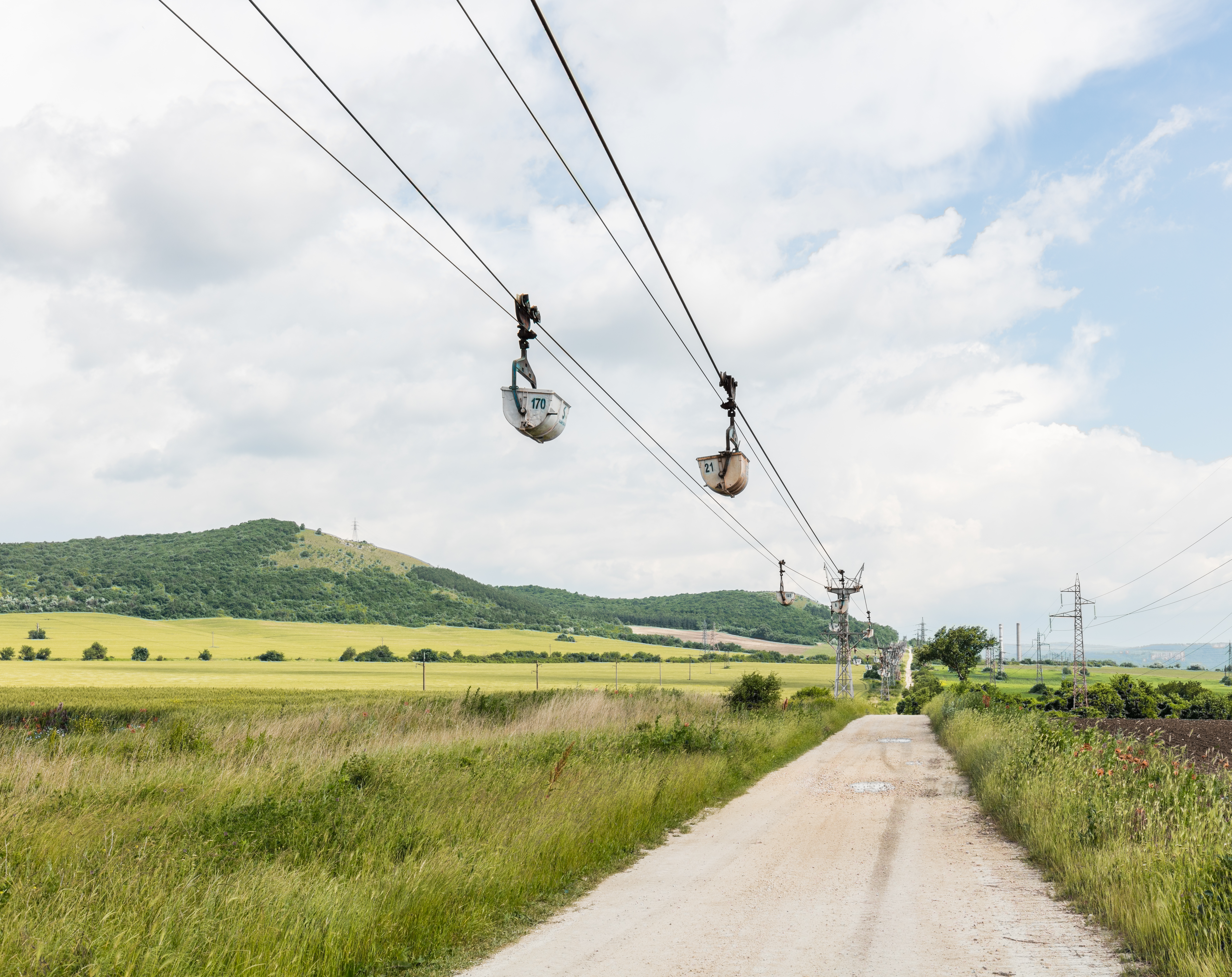
Mining transport in Devnya, Bulgaria

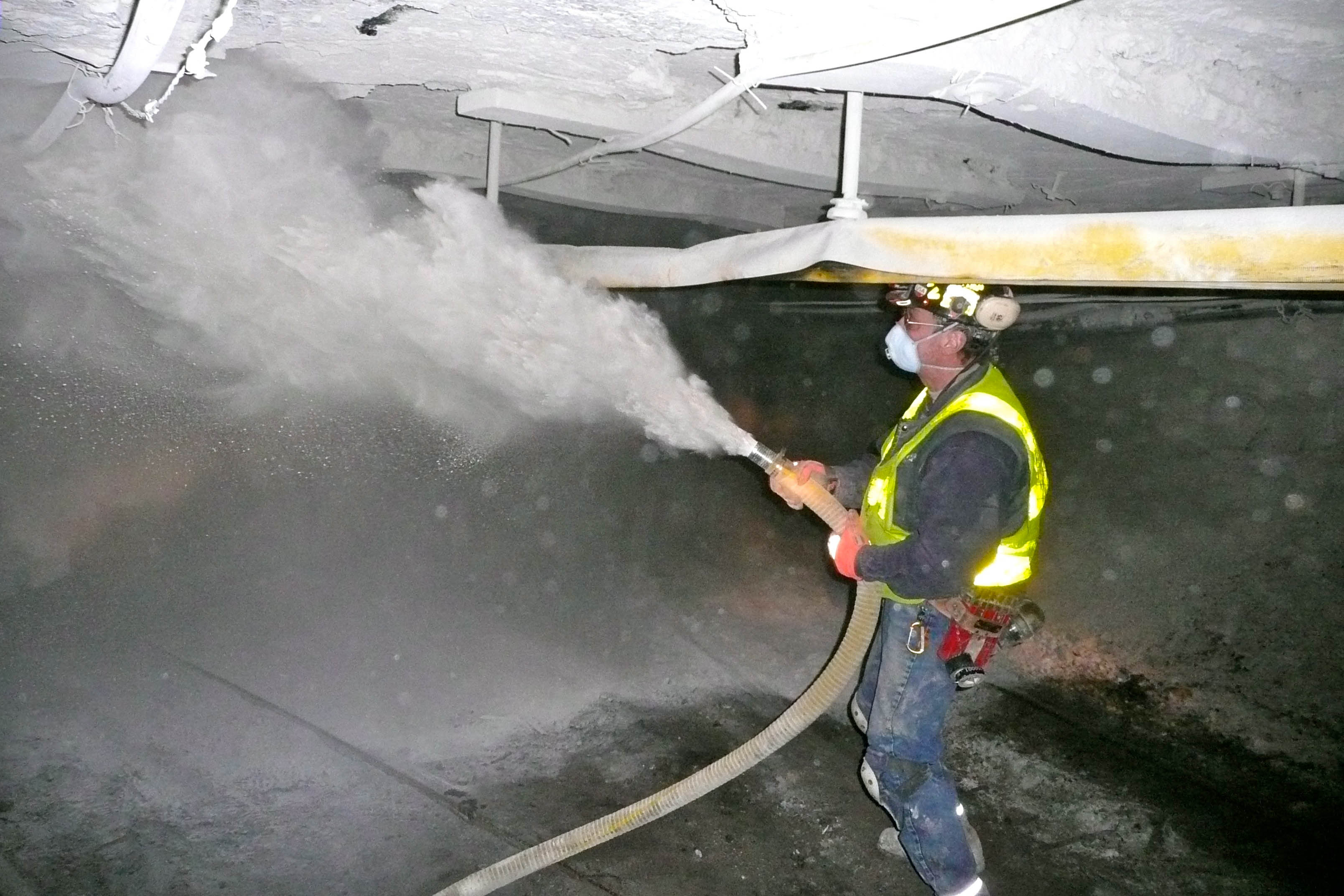
A coal miner in West Virginia spraying rock dust to reduce the combustible fraction of coal dust in the air

Safety has long been a concern in the mining business, especially in sub-surface mining. The Courrières mine disaster, Europe's worst mining accident, involved the death of 1,099 miners in Northern France on March 10, 1906. This disaster was surpassed only by the Benxihu Colliery accident in China on April 26, 1942, which killed 1,549 miners. Although mining has become substantially safer than it was in previous decades, mining accidents still occur.

Government figures indicate that around 5,000 Chinese miners die in accidents each year, while other reports have suggested a figure as high as 20,000.

Between 1870 and 1920 in Queensland, Australia, an increase in mining accidents led to more safety measures regarding the use of explosives in mining.

In the Democratic Republic of the Congo (DRC), safety concerns have been raised for both those who work in the mines and those who live in the surrounding areas. Workers are usually seen with a mustard-colored powder that turned out to be "...dried sulfuric acid, [which] they use in the mine to process the [mineral] ores. Surrounding the mine, there is a "small stream of foul, sludgy water that passes beneath a bridge next to the fence." Around the mine, biomonitoring studies of metal exposure show that "The levels found in Kinshasa remain above the CDC reference value (>5 μg/dL) and constitute a public health concern," and that subjects living close (< 3 km) to mines or metal-processing industries have higher urinary concentrations of various metals (p < 0.01) than those living further away (3–10 km)," revealing an "... absence of a national policy to control and prevent exposure to harmful chemicals." In the mines, specifically at the Tenke Fungurume mine, there were hundreds of thousands of people [who] engaged in the feverish excavation of cobalt in medieval conditions." These workers were locals who worked for "two dollars (roughly one day's income)." In addition, the rates of schistosomiasis, a mining related disease endemic to DRC, were found to be "higher among mining workers (27%) than in the total population (<13 %)," indicating harmful long-term impacts for the workers.

In South Africa, issues are similar to those in the DRC. Miners are exposed to silica dust, which "increases the risk of pulmonary tuberculosis," with a tuberculosis rate of "over 1,000 per 100,000." "Mine shafts themselves are crowded and poorly-ventilated, but so are hostels where over a dozen men can share a small room. These conditions are highly conducive to infection; the rate of recurrent tuberculosis in a recent South African prospective cohort of 600 miners was about 8 per 100 person-years," which increases the risk of tuberculosis spreading in both mining and living locations. Past the mines, the "extraction of minerals often leads to the disruption of ecosystems, polluting water sources, and degrading habitats including cultural heritage critical for the livelihoods of people."

Mining accidents continue worldwide, including incidents that have caused dozens of fatalities at a time, such as the 2007 Ulyanovskaya Mine disaster in Russia, the 2009 Heilongjiang mine explosion in China, and the 2010 Upper Big Branch Mine disaster in the United States. Mining has been identified by the National Institute for Occupational Safety and Health (NIOSH) as a priority industry sector in the National Occupational Research Agenda (NORA) to identify and provide intervention strategies regarding occupational health and safety issues. The Mining Safety and Health Administration (MSHA) was established in 1978 to "work to prevent death, illness, and injury from mining and promote safe and healthful workplaces for US miners." Since its implementation in 1978, the number of miner fatalities has decreased from 242 miners in 1978 to 24 miners in 2019.

There are numerous occupational hazards associated with mining, including exposure to rockdust, which can lead to diseases such as silicosis, asbestosis, and pneumoconiosis. Gases in the mine can lead to asphyxiation and have a risk of ignition. Mining equipment can generate considerable noise, putting workers at risk for hearing loss. Cave-ins, rock falls, and exposure to excess heat are also known hazards. The NIOSH Recommended Exposure Limit (REL) of noise is 85 dBA with a 3 dBA exchange rate, and the MSHA Permissible Exposure Limit (PEL) is 90 dBA with a 5 dBA exchange rate as an 8-hour time-weighted average. NIOSH has found that 25% of noise-exposed workers in Mining, Quarrying, and Oil and Gas Extraction have hearing impairment. The prevalence of hearing loss increased by 1% from 1991 to 2001 within these workers.

Noise studies have been conducted in several mining environments. Stageloaders (84-102 dBA), shearers (85-99 dBA), auxiliary fans (84–120 dBA), continuous mining machines (78–109 dBA), and roof bolters (92–103 dBA) represent some of the noisiest equipment in underground coal mines. Dragline oilers, dozer operators, and welders using air arcing were occupations with the highest noise exposures among surface coal miners. Coal mines had the highest hearing loss injury likelihood.

== Environmental effects ==
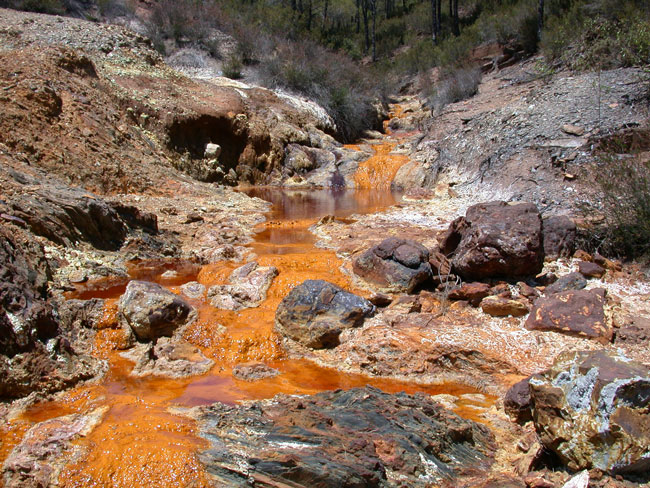
Acid mine drainage in the Rio Tinto River

Environmental impact of mining can occur at local, regional, and global scales through direct and indirect mining practices. Mining can cause erosion, sinkholes, loss of biodiversity, or the contamination of soil, groundwater, and surface water by chemicals emitted from mining processes. These processes also affect the atmosphere through carbon emissions which contributes to climate change.

Some mining methods (lithium mining, phosphate mining, coal mining, mountaintop removal mining, and sand mining) may have such significant environmental and public health effects that mining companies in some countries are required to follow strict environmental and rehabilitation codes to ensure that the mined area returns to its original state. Mining can provide various advantages to societies, yet it can also spark conflicts, particularly regarding land use both above and below the surface.

Mining operations remain rigorous and intrusive, often resulting in significant environmental impacts on local ecosystems and broader implications for planetary environmental health. To accommodate mines and associated infrastructure, land is cleared extensively, consuming significant energy and water resources, emitting air pollutants, and producing hazardous waste.

According to The World Counts page "The amount of resources mined from Earth is up from 39.3 billion tons in 2002. A 55 percent increase in less than 20 years. This puts Earth's natural resources under heavy pressure. We are already extracting 75 percent more than Earth can sustain in the long run."

Mining activities can significantly contribute to water pollution through the release of heavy metals and toxic substances into surrounding waterways. Processes such as acid mine drainage occur when sulfide minerals are exposed to air and water, producing acidic runoff that carry contaminants such as arsenic, lead, and mercury into rivers and groundwater. This pollution can harm aquatic ecosystems, reduce water quality, and pose risks to human health, particularly in communities that rely on local water sources for drinking and agriculture. In some cases, contamination persists long after mining operations have stopped, making remediation difficult and costly.

Water pollution from mining can also result from the storage and disposal of mine waste, including tailings and waste rock, which may contain hazardous chemicals and heavy metals. Failures or leaks in tailings storage facilities have released large volumes of contaminated materials into rivers and surrounding ecosystems, causing widespread environmental damage. Even without major failures, runoff from mining sites can transport pollutants into nearby waterways during rainfall events, further degrading water quality. Abandoned mine sites are a particularly significant source of ongoing contamination, as untreated drainage can continue to release acidic and metal laden water into the environment for decades after closure.

This is important because water is vital for many communities' survival. Fresh rivers are a source of fish and fresh water. However, the water isn't fresh anymore, it is heavily polluted by toxic runoff from nearby mines. Researcher Siddharth Kara explains that in the context of cobalt mining in the Democratic Republic of Congo, "water is heavily polluted, a condition that local residents attribute to toxic runoff from nearby mines. The environmental researcher at the University of Lubumbashi whom I met after my visit to Kipushi, Germain, took samples from the river water near Mupanja and found particularly high levels of lead, chromium, cobalt, and industrial acids. When I inspected the water, it had an unnaturally dark color and was topped with slicks and sludge".

=== Waste ===
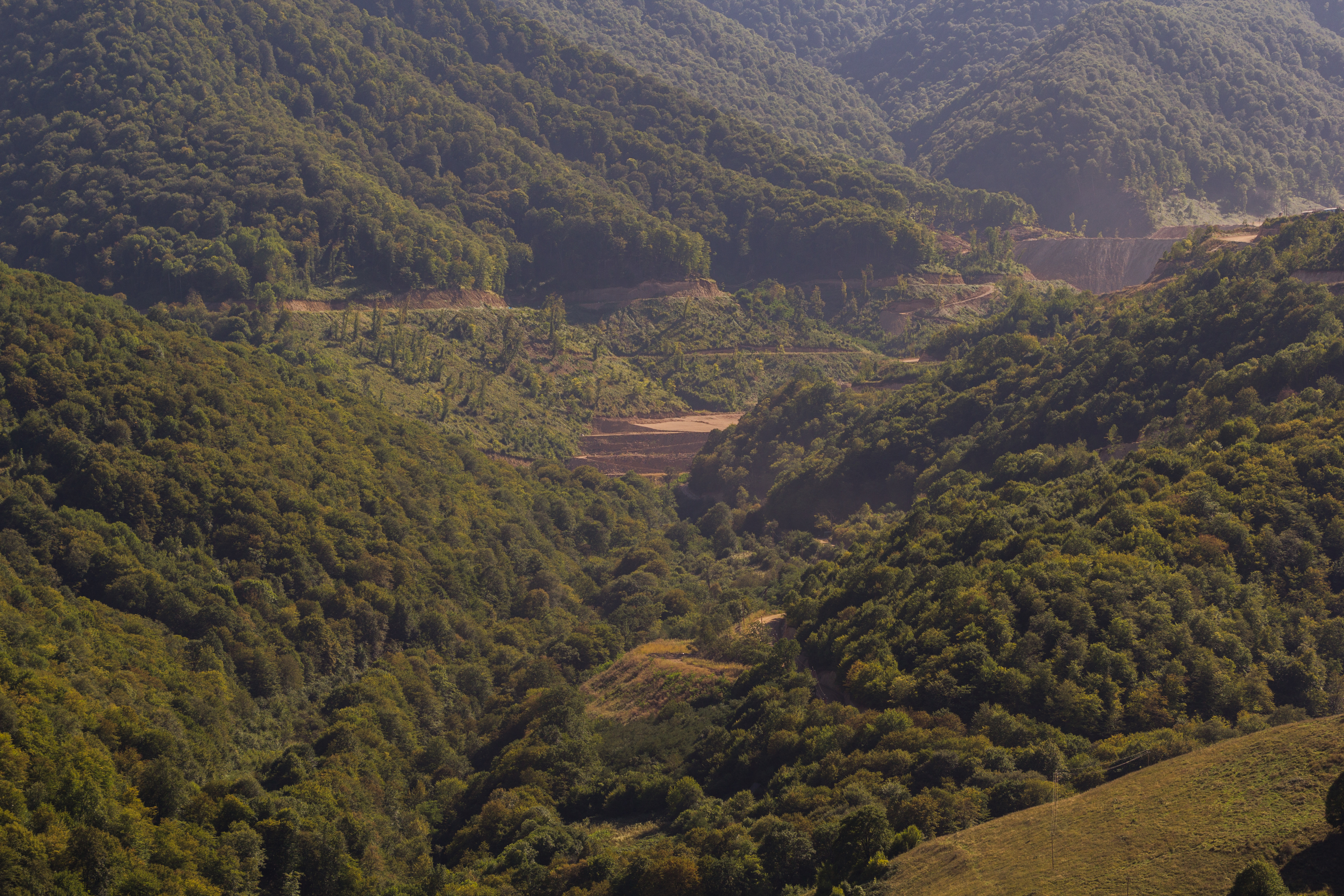
Location of waste rock storage (center) at Teghut (village) Copper-Molybdenum Mine in Armenia's northern Lori province

Ore mills generate large amounts of waste, called tailings. For example, 99 tons of waste is generated per ton of copper, with even higher ratios in gold mining – because only 5.3 g of gold is extracted per ton of ore, a ton of gold produces 200,000 tons of tailings. (As time goes on and richer deposits are exhausted – and technology improves – this number is going down to .5 g and less.) These tailings can be toxic. Tailings, which are usually produced as a slurry, are most commonly dumped into ponds made from naturally existing valleys. These ponds are secured by impoundments (dams or embankment dams). In 2000, it was estimated that 3,500 tailings impoundments existed, and that every year, 2 to 5 major failures and 35 minor failures occurred. For example, in the Marcopper mining disaster at least 2 million tons of tailings were released into a local river. In 2015, Barrick Gold Corporation spilled over 1 million liters of cyanide into a total of five rivers in Argentina near their Veladero mine. Since 2007 in central Finland, the Talvivaara Terrafame polymetal mine's waste effluent and leaks of saline mine water have resulted in ecological collapse of a nearby lake. Subaqueous tailings disposal is another option. The mining industry has argued that submarine tailings disposal (STD), which disposes of tailings in the sea, is ideal because it avoids the risks of tailings ponds. The practice is illegal in the United States and Canada, but it is used in the developing world.

The waste is classified as either sterile or mineralized, with acid-generating potential, and the movement and storage of this material form a major part of the mine planning process. When an economic cut-off determines the mineralised package, the near-grade mineralised waste is usually dumped separately, with a view to later treatment should market conditions change, and it becomes economically viable. Civil engineering design parameters are used for waste dump design, with special conditions applying to high-rainfall and seismically active areas. Waste dump designs must meet all regulatory requirements of the country in whose jurisdiction the mine is located. It is also common practice to rehabilitate dumps to an internationally acceptable standard, which, in some cases, means applying higher standards than the local regulatory standard.

Abandoned and inactive mines can continue to create environmental risks after operations have ended. They can have detrimental effects on soil, water, plants, and animals. Acid mine drainage, which occurs when minerals are exposed to air and water, can result in the long-term release of acid water and heavy metals into nearby water. These effects can continue for decades or longer, contaminating drinking water and harming ecosystems. The National Park Service explains that, "Soils and water contaminated with heavy metals or chemicals from mineral processing may be harmful to wildlife. These contaminants can become increasingly concentrated in animals higher up the food chain in a process called biomagnification. Affected animals could die or become unable to reproduce".

== Regulation ==
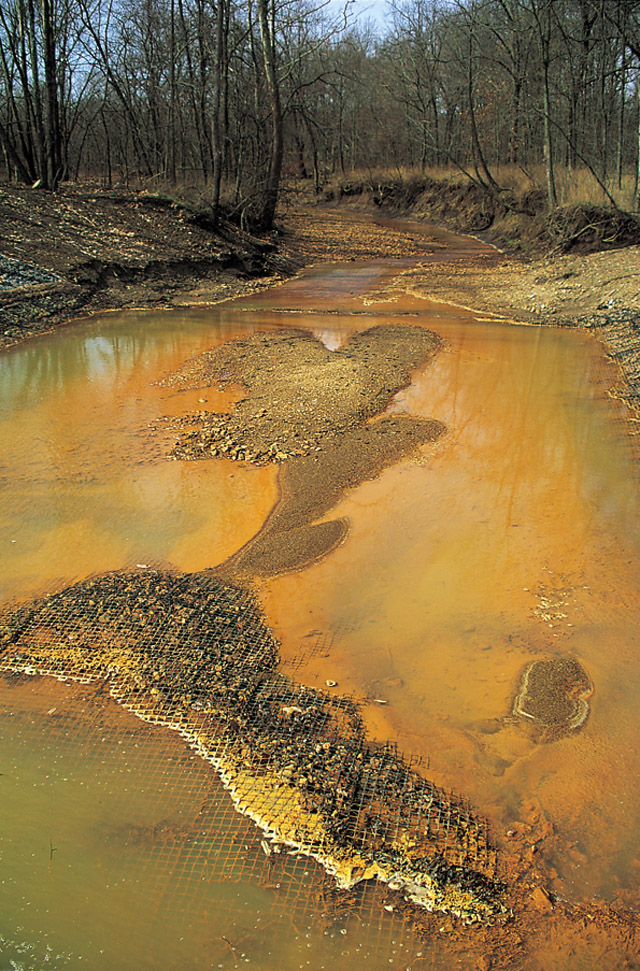
Iron hydroxide precipitate stains a stream receiving acid drainage from surface coal mining.

Countries with strongly enforced mining regulations commonly require environmental impact assessment, development of environmental management plans, and mine closure planning before beginning mine operations. Environmental monitoring during operation and after closure may also be required. Government regulations may not be well enforced, especially in the developing world. Differences between countries in mining regulation stringency incentivize mining in pollution havens, worsening the global impact of mining.

For major mining companies and any company seeking international financing, there are some other mechanisms to enforce environmental standards. These generally relate to financing standards such as the Equator Principles, IFC environmental standards, and criteria for Socially responsible investing. Mining companies have used this oversight from the financial sector to argue for some level of industry self-regulation. In 1992, a Draft Code of Conduct for Transnational Corporations was proposed at the Rio Earth Summit by the UN Centre for Transnational Corporations (UNCTC), but the Business Council for Sustainable Development (BCSD) together with the International Chamber of Commerce (ICC) argued successfully for self-regulation instead.

This was followed by the Global Mining Initiative which was begun by nine of the largest metals and mining companies and which led to the formation of the International Council on Mining and Metals, whose purpose was to "act as a catalyst" in an effort to improve social and environmental performance in the mining and metals industry internationally. The mining industry has provided funding to various conservation groups, some of which have been working with conservation agendas that are at odds with an emerging acceptance of the rights of indigenous people – particularly the right to make land-use decisions.

Certification of mines with good practices is issued by the International Organization for Standardization (ISO). For example, ISO 9000 and ISO 14001, which certify an "auditable environmental management system", involve brief inspections, although they have been criticized for lacking rigor. Certification is also available through Ceres' Global Reporting Initiative, but these reports are voluntary and unverified. Miscellaneous other certification programs exist for various projects, typically through nonprofit groups.

The purpose of a 2012 EPS PEAKS paper was to provide evidence on policies managing ecological costs and maximize socio-economic benefits of mining using host country regulatory initiatives. It found existing literature suggesting that donors encourage developing countries to:

- Make the environment-poverty link and introduce cutting-edge wealth measures and natural capital accounts.
- Reform old taxes in line with more recent financial innovation, engage directly with the companies, enact land use and impact assessments, and incorporate specialized support and standards agencies.
- Set in play transparency and community participation initiatives using the wealth accrued.

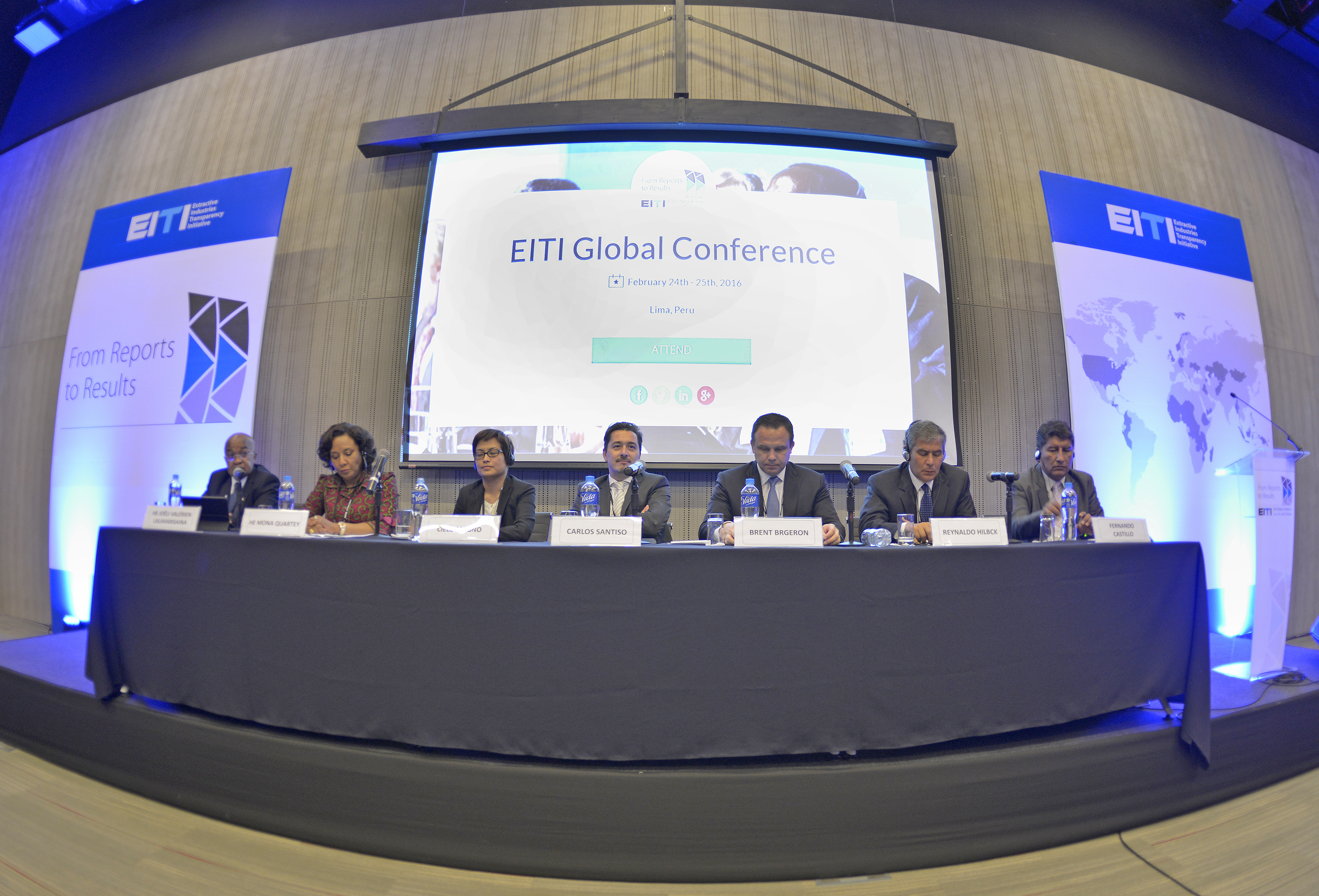
EITI Global Conference 2016

New regulations and a process of legislative reforms aim to improve the harmonization and stability of the mining sector in mineral-rich countries. New legislation for mining industry in African countries still appears to be an issue, but has the potential to be solved, when a consensus is reached on the best approach. By the beginning of the 21st century, the booming and increasingly complex mining sector in mineral-rich countries was providing only slight benefits to local communities, especially given the sustainability issues. Increasing debate and influence by NGOs and local communities called for new approaches which would also include disadvantaged communities, and work towards sustainable development even after mine closure (including transparency and revenue management). By the early 2000s, community development issues and resettlement had become mainstream concerns in World Bank mining projects. Mining-industry expansion after mineral prices increased in 2003, and also potential fiscal revenues in those countries created an omission in the other economic sectors in terms of finances and development. Furthermore, this highlighted the regional and local demand for mining revenues and the inability of sub-national governments to use them effectively. The Fraser Institute (a Canadian think tank) has highlighted the environmental protection laws in developing countries, as well as voluntary efforts by mining companies to improve their environmental impact.

In 2007, the Extractive Industries Transparency Initiative (EITI) was mainstreamed in all countries cooperating with the World Bank in mining industry reform. The EITI operates and was implemented with the support of the EITI multi-donor trust fund, managed by the World Bank. The EITI aims to increase transparency in transactions between governments and companies in extractive industries by monitoring the revenues and benefits between industries and recipient governments. The entrance process is voluntary for each country and is monitored by multiple stakeholders, including governments, private companies, and civil society representatives, responsible for disclosure and dissemination of the reconciliation report; however, the competitive disadvantage of company-by-company public report is, for some of the businesses in Ghana at least, the main constraint. Therefore, the outcome assessment in terms of failure or success of the new EITI regulation does not only "rest on the government's shoulders" but also on civil society and companies.

However, implementation has issues; inclusion or exclusion of artisanal mining and small-scale mining (ASM) from the EITI, and how to deal with "non-cash" payments made by companies to subnational governments. Furthermore, the disproportionate revenues the mining industry can bring to the comparatively small number of people that it employs, causes other problems, like a lack of investment in other less lucrative sectors, leading to swings in government revenue because of volatility in the oil markets. Artisanal mining is clearly an issue in EITI Countries such as the Central African Republic, D.R. Congo, Guinea, Liberia, and Sierra Leone – i.e., almost half of the mining countries implementing the EITI. Among other things, the limited scope of the EITI involving disparity in terms of knowledge of the industry and negotiation skills, thus far, flexibility of the policy (e.g., liberty of the countries to expand beyond the minimum requirements and adapt it to their needs), creates another risk of unsuccessful implementation. Increased public awareness, with the government acting as a bridge between the public and the initiative to ensure a successful policy outcome, is an important element to consider.

=== Enforcement ===
There is a lack of law enforcement in various countries. For example, "although South Africa has strong regulations to avoid potential mining impacts, lack of enforcement and corruption have been barriers to combating social and environmental injustices," leading to unsafe working conditions for many miners (see Safety Section). In the DRC, "more than half of the DRC's natural resource exports are not officially recorded because of tax evasion and state institutions' lack of governance capacity," and "90% of minerals come from artisanal miners," which are indigenous people. In Ghana, similar safety issues exist. This is because "inadequate monitoring of the operations and lack of regulatory enforcement by the Minerals Commission of Ghana are major contributing factors to the environmental, safety, and national security issues of the operations," implying a failure of enforcement from local authorities, similar to these other countries.

=== Mining and Land Rights ===
Mining operations often intersect with land rights in complex and sometimes contentious ways. In many countries, land ownership and mineral resource ownership are legally separated, with mineral rights usually vested in the state, while individuals or communities may own land.

This creates a situation in which communities may have legal ownership of the surface land but limited control over mineral extraction beneath it. Customary land tenure, prevalent in many rural areas, often governs land use and inheritance.

Mining in these areas can disrupt farming, grazing, and culturally significant sites, and communities without formal titles may be vulnerable to displacement or inadequate compensation.

== Issues ==
In addition to the environmental impacts of mining processes, a prominent criticism of this form of extractive practice and of mining companies concerns the human rights abuses occurring at mining sites and in communities near them. Frequently, despite being protected by International Labor rights, miners are not given appropriate equipment to provide them with protection from possible mine collapse or from harmful pollutants and chemicals expelled during the mining process, work in inhumane conditions spending numerous hours working in extreme heat, darkness and 14 hour workdays with no allocated time for breaks. In addition, many of these legal structures disproportionally harm indigenous communities.

These are all examples of environmental justice. Environmental justice refers to the fair distribution of environmental benefits and burdens, as well as the involvement of all communities in environmental decision making. In the context of mining, environmental justice concerns arise when environmental and health impacts disproportionately affect low income, indigenous, or marginalized populations. These impacts include exposure to toxic substances, displacement from land, and limited access to political or legal resources to address this environmental harm. Mining operations are often located in regions where communities have less political power, raising concerns about inequality and long-term environmental and social consequences.

Mining related environmental impacts are often unevenly distributed, disproportionately affecting rural and low income communities. Abandoned mines, toxic waste, and water contamination can persist long after mining operations stop, creating long-term burdens on communities. From Massachusetts Institute of Technology, they mentioned the March 2023 United Nations Water Conference in New York, explaining that "A quarter of the world's population already faces 'extremely high water stress' according to the World Resources Institute (Blais, 2024)." This is a problem because mining requires an enormous amount of water, already straining local water supplies. The world is already at risk for water deprivation, so almost every population and community is at risk. Communities affected by mining require fair rights and resources to help prevent environmental contamination from affecting them but also everyone (Blais, 2024).

=== Democratic Republic of Congo ===
In the Democratic Republic of the Congo, mining, specifically for cobalt, has been associated with significant human rights concerns. Artisanal and small-scale mining operations often involve hazardous working conditions, including exposure to toxic dust, risk of tunnel collapses, and a lack of protective equipment. Reports have documented the use of child labor and low wages in mining areas. Workers and nearby communities also face long-term health risks due to environmental contamination from mining activities. These conditions have raised concerns from nearby communities regarding supply chains and the responsibility of multinational corporations involved in mineral sourcing.

Conditions in the mines and nearby communities have become difficult places to live, work, and stay in. While digging in the mines, it is difficult to predict when walls of the mines will collapse and cause irreversible injuries. Researcher Siddharth Kara provides examples of such issues in the Democratic Republic of the Congo, explaining that "While [miners] were digging, one of the walls of the pit collapsed. [Miners] were buried in an avalanche of stones and dirt". After this collapse, "The clinic did not have any painkillers other than acetaminophen, which was incapable of dulling his discomfort. The clinic also did not have antibiotics to treat a potential infection, nor an x-ray machine with which to determine the extent of the bone damage" (Kara, 2023). Because of the damage from the mine and the lack of accessible healthcare, people suffer from irreversible damage for the rest of their lives, making them unable to walk, therefore unable to work in the mines again and make money to support their family. Working in the mines puts you at risk for injury and even death. From the Human Rights Research Center, Erina Bazán López, a motivated scholar, writes about the recent toll of cobalt mining on people in the Congo. "On November 15, a makeshift bridge on a cobalt and copper mine collapsed in Lualaba province in Democratic Republic of Congo, killing at least 32 people. The disasters occurred in a semi-industrial mine in the southeastern Kalando area of the province, where a comprehensive restriction prohibiting access had been previously put in place due to heavy rains that exacerbated risks of landslides in the territory (Bazán López, 2025). There are many of these incidents happening in the DRC throughout the years, often unpredictable.

Artisanal miners, who account for a substantial portion of cobalt production in the country, often work in informal settings with limited regulatory oversight, making enforcement of labor and safety standards difficult. In some mining regions, individuals rely on daily extraction for income, creating economic pressures that contribute to unsafe practices and the involvement of children in mining activities. Environmental contamination from mining operations, including the release of heavy metals into soil and water, has been linked to broader public health concerns in surrounding communities. These conditions have prompted increased international attention and calls for greater supply chain transparency, corporate due diligence, and stronger regulatory frameworks to help improve labor conditions and reduce environmental health risks.

There has been an increase in child labor in the Democratic Republic of Congo. Children start working in the mines when they are very young, experiencing the true conditions of the mines including toxic air, injuries, and an overall unsafe environment for children to work in. The main reason for child labor is due to the need for income. Because people working in the mines only get paid 2 dollars per day, this drives many families to send more of their members, including children, into the mines. Kara explained to NPR that "Hundreds of thousands of people have been displaced because their villages were just bulldozed over to make place for large mining concessions. So you have people with no alternative, no other source of income, no livelihood. Now, add to that the menace in many cases of armed forces pressuring people to dig, parents having to make a painful decision, 'Do I send my child to school or do we eat today?' And if they choose the latter, that means bringing all their kids into these toxic pits to dig just to earn that extra fifty cents or a dollar a day, that could mean the difference between eating or not" (Kara, 2023). Need for income drives families to send their children into the mines, exposing them to toxins, and potential physical health effects from falling walls. Most families do not have a choice about sending their kids, because otherwise they would not eat. An increase in income would change lots of peoples lives, and likely prevent child labor.

In response to unsafe working conditions and low wages, miners and local communities in the Democratic Republic of the Congo have engaged in protests and labor activism, "driven by socioeconomic issues" (Manojlovic & Kabanga, 2023). Miners and local communities have organized demonstrations and strikes to demand improved safety standards, fair wages, and greater corporate accountability. These movements have also called attention to the environmental impacts of mining, including pollution and land degradation, and have sought stronger regulatory oversight. Such activism highlights the role of affected communities in advocating for labor rights and environmental protections within the global mining industry. In addition to public demonstrations, workers and advocacy groups have pushed for formal recognition of artisanal mining, the implementation of safety regulations, and increased oversight of mining operations. International organizations and civil society groups have also collaborated to promote responsible sourcing initiatives, including supply chain transparency and certification programs to reduce child labor and improve working conditions. The details of the protests in the DRC have been harshly repressed by the police, resulting in deaths and have caused people to have been evicted from their homes (Manojlovic & Kabanga, 2023). Through harsh conditions, people of the DRC have continued to show ongoing attempts to secure safer labor environments and more equitable participation in the benefits of resource extraction.

=== Child labor ===
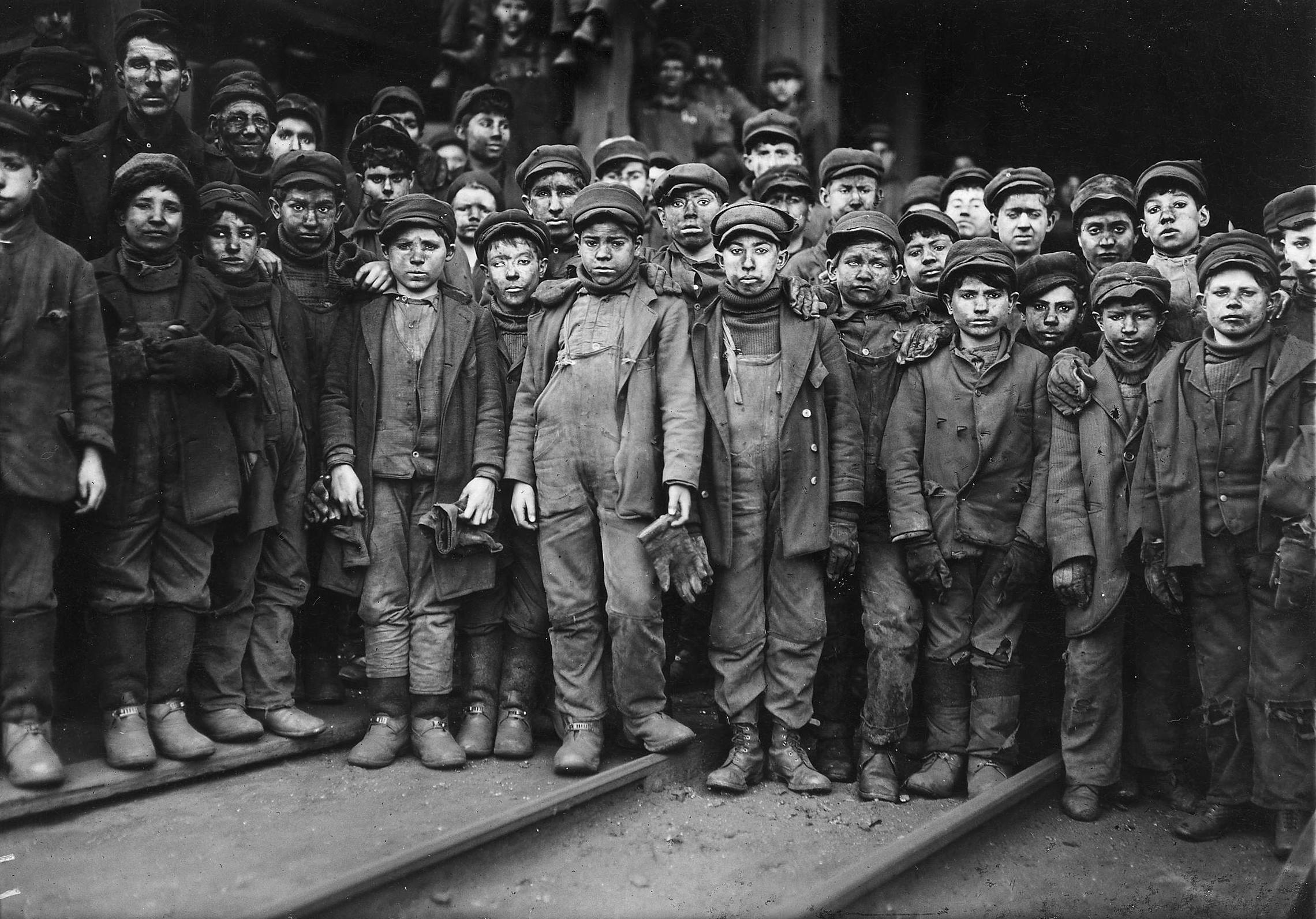
Breaker boys: child workers who broke down coal at a mine in South Pittston, Pennsylvania, United States in the early 20th century

Included within the human rights abuses that occur during mining processes are instances of child labor. These instances have sparked widespread criticism of mining cobalt, a mineral essential for powering modern technologies such as laptops, smartphones, and electric vehicles. Many of these cases of child laborers are found in locations such as the Democratic Republic of Congo, South Africa, the Philippines, Australia, and Brazil. Reports have risen of children carrying sacks of cobalt weighing 25 kg from small mines to local traders being paid for their work only in food and accommodation. Many companies, such as Apple, Google, Microsoft, and Tesla have been implicated in lawsuits brought by families whose children were severely injured or killed during mining activities in Congo. In December 2019, 14 Congolese families filed a lawsuit against Glencore, a mining company which supplies the essential cobalt to these multinational corporations with allegations of negligence that led to the deaths of children or injuries such as broken spines, emotional distress and forced labor.

=== Indigenous peoples ===
There have been instances of killings and evictions attributed to conflicts with mining companies. Almost a third of 227 murders in 2020 were of Indigenous peoples rights activists on the frontlines of climate change activism linked to logging, mining, large-scale agribusiness, hydroelectric dams, and other infrastructure, according to Global Witness.

Struggles over access to land define the relationship between indigenous peoples and mining.

In the Democratic Republic of the Congo, there are issues with both evictions and a lack of compensation. There are "forced evictions taking place as companies that seek to expand industrial-scale copper and cobalt mining projects are wrecking lives" and "following protests, in 2019 Chemaf, the company responsible for the industrial mining projects, agreed to pay via the local authority US$1.5 million, but some former residents received as little as US$300." According to the US government report, "Corruption and official complicity in trafficking crimes remained significant concerns, impeding law enforcement and judicial action. Sources reported widespread complicity, including allegations that government officials directly engaged in trafficking, helped facilitate the crime, and obstructed justice. Government officials accepted bribes to overlook labor abuses, including forced labor and the worst forms of child labor, in the mining sector. Perpetrators of sexual violence, including sex trafficking, were rarely held accountable, and security forces continued to sexually abuse and exploit victims, including children, with impunity." There is little information about what citizens of DRC are doing in retaliation.

In South Africa, according to health scientist Brad Kistanasamy and their peers, their "mineral resources have produced, and continue to produce, enormous economic wealth; yet decades of colonialism, apartheid, capital flight, and challenges in the neoliberal post-apartheid era have resulted in high rates of occupational lung disease and low rates of compensation for ex-miners and their families." According to Amnesty International, "By the end of 2017, 111,166 miners had received compensation (of which 55,864 were for permanent lung impairment, and another 52,473 for tuberculosis), however 107,714 compensable claims remained unpaid." To address current lead poisoning, there is a current class action "by residents of Kabwe (Zambia) against the mining company Anglo American in South Africa. The claimants allege severe lead poisoning caused by mining operations in Kabwe. SALC and Amnesty International submit that the case represents a pivotal moment for corporate accountability and the rights of communities affected by transnational and transgenerational harm."

In Australia, the Aboriginal Bininj said mining posed a threat to their living culture and could damage sacred heritage sites. Although Australia is one of the most profitable mining countries, "Aboriginal and Torres Strait Islanders (henceforward referred to as Indigenous Australians) have not shared in this bounty equitably, with social and economic disadvantage exacerbated where mining activity is the greatest. As of now, "Australian restoration networks are still poorly articulated and not in the position to stimulate an inclusive sector aligned with democratic and participatory engagements with Indigenous Australians."

In the Philippines, an anti-mining movement has raised concerns regarding "the total disregard for [Indigenous communities'] ancestral land rights." According to Geographic Scientist William Holden and their peers, "Those unfamiliar with indigenous culture may mistakenly believe that mining poses minimal risks, since indigenous peoples have little income or wealth to lose and [suffer from] high unemployment," when in reality "such a view is incorrect because 'the wealth that supports the sustainability of their culture is found in institutions, environmental knowledge, local resources, and especially in land embellished with cultural meaning." Ifugao peoples' opposition to mining led a governor to proclaim a ban on mining operations in Mountain Province, Philippines.

In Brazil, more than 170 tribes organized a march to oppose controversial attempts to strip back indigenous land rights and open their territories to mining operations. The United Nations Commission on Human Rights has called on Brazil's Supreme Court to uphold Indigenous land rights to prevent exploitation by mining groups and industrial agriculture. For issues such as gold mining and illegal mining, " uniform law enforcement is required to prevent the waterbed effect (when fighting miners somewhere, they pop up elsewhere); the unhinged miners have not been hinged yet. In addition, gold trading laws need to be strengthened to ensure accountability for the illegal gold trade in the Amazon.

Uranium mining has had significant impacts on Indigenous communities because their tribes are located near their land. In the article, Green Victimization of Native Americans: Uranium Mining as a Form of Toxic Colonialism and Genocide, it says, "A recent study exploring the consumption of sheep in a Navajo community demonstrated how contamination from uranium mining affected diet and had cultural implications. Although sheep were traditionally a staple in Navajo diet, the authors found Navajo consumption of sheep was mostly ceremonial. However, the Navajo suggested the contamination of sheep could alter or threaten traditional ceremonies" (Fegadel, 2023). Because of the impacts contamination from uranium mining has on the ecological system, this results in traditional tribal lifestyle to be affected. Along with sheep, fish and local plants are used for medicinal and ceremonial purposes. The presence of contamination in soil, water, and air pose a major risk to Native Americans. "In particular, the biocencentration of uranium by aquatic and terrestrial plants is a primary exposure pathway for Native Americans. These plants are consumed directly by Native Americans, as well as aquatic and terrestrial animals, which are then consumed by Native Americans" (Fegadel, 2023).

In Green Victimization of Native Americans: Uranium Mining as a Form of Toxic Colonialism and Genocide, Averi R. Fegadel says, "The prevalence of poverty and unemployment among expendability, thus their lands are targeted by the U.S. government and large corporations. In 1987, approximately 50% of Native Americans live in communities with one or more uncontrolled toxic waste sites" (Fegadel, 2023).

There have already been international loopholes that threaten the safety of indigenous miners (see safety regulations). These often exist due to "multiple factors such as colonial legacies, economic inequalities, global power imbalances, inadequate governance, regulatory weaknesses, and insufficient community participation." In these countries, mining legislation and regulations either don't include the scope of compensation for indigenous populations, or aren't enforced. For example, the Mines and Minerals Act in Zimbabwe "does not provide for direct compensation to inhabitants of Communal Lands, making them particularly vulnerable." Although there are laws against child labor in the DRC, "In the DRC cobalt belt, field research describes 'subterranean slavery' in which children descend 10–30m pits to fill sacks of ore for as little as US $1–2 per day. Violence has intensified rather than fallen since U.S. conflict-mineral legislation, with statistically significant spikes in armed incidents around mine sites," which is most likely not enforced due to financial benefit. For justice to be secured, laws need to both encapsulate justice for indigenous communities and enforce them, despite any financial incentives to do otherwise.

== Records ==
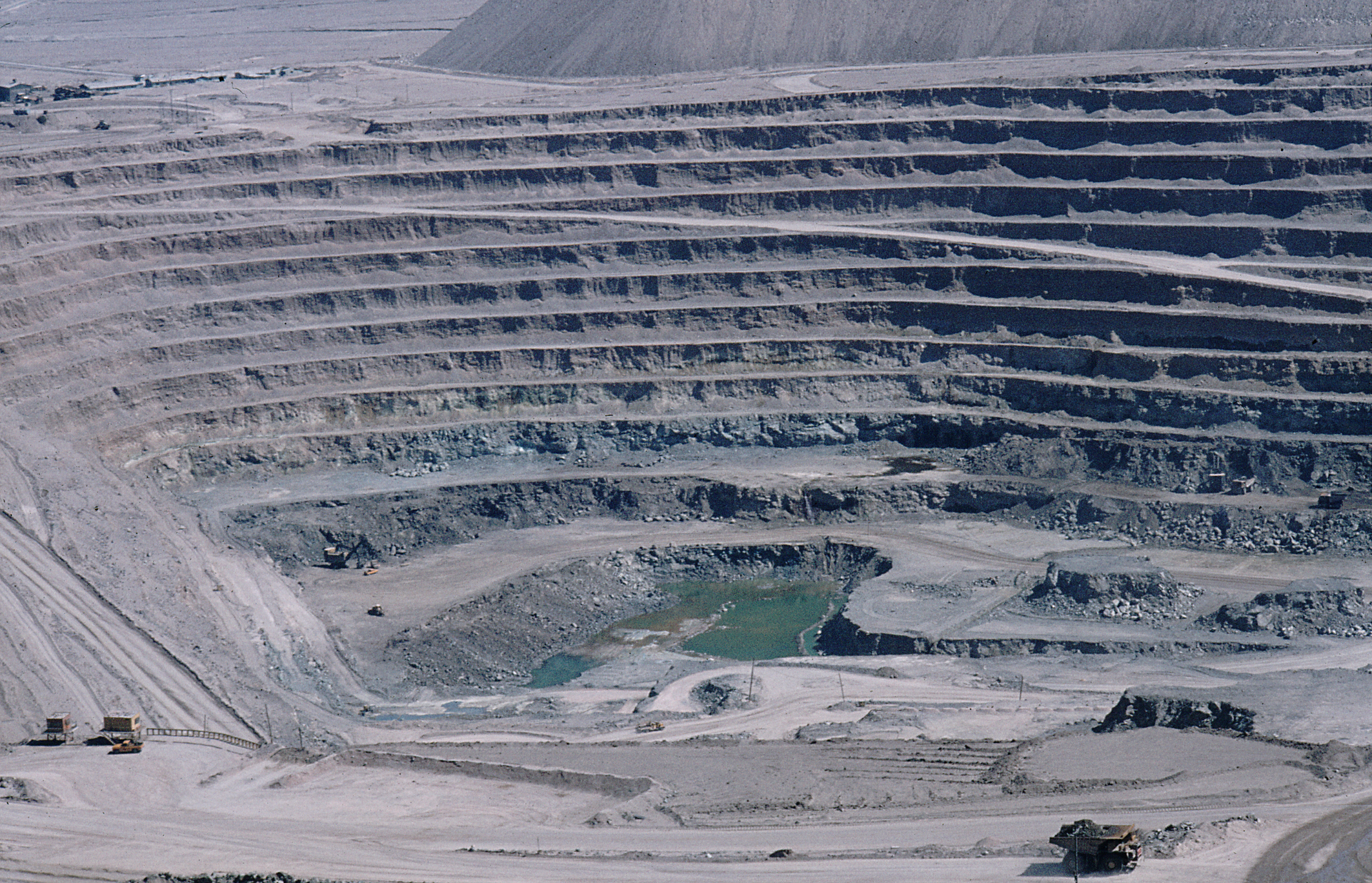
Chuquicamata, Chile, site of the largest circumference and second deepest open pit copper mine in the world

As of 2026, Mponeng is the world's deepest mine from ground level, reaching a depth of over 4 km (2.5 mi) below ground level. The trip from the surface to the bottom of the mine takes over an hour. It is a gold mine in South Africa's Gauteng province. Previously known as Western Deep Levels #1 Shaft, the underground and surface works were commissioned in 1987. The mine is considered one of the largest gold mines in the world.

The Moab Khutsong gold mine in North West Province (South Africa) has the world's longest winding steel wire rope, which can lower workers to 3,054 metres (10,020 ft) in a single uninterrupted four-minute journey.

The deepest mine in Europe is the 16th shaft of the uranium mines in Příbram, Czech Republic, at 1,838 metres (6,030 ft). Second is Bergwerk Saar in Saarland, Germany, at 1,750 metres (5,740 ft).

The deepest open-pit mine in the world is Bingham Canyon Mine in Bingham Canyon, Utah, United States, at over 1,200 metres (3,900 ft). The largest and second-deepest open-pit copper mine in the world is Chuquicamata in northern Chile, at 900 metres (3,000 ft), which annually produces 443,000 tons of copper and 20,000 tons of molybdenum.

The deepest open-pit mine with respect to sea level is Tagebau Hambach in Germany, where the base of the pit is 299 metres (981 ft) below sea level.

The largest underground mine is Kiirunavaara Mine in Kiruna, Sweden. With 450 kilometres (280 miles) of roads, 40 million tonnes of annually produced ore, and a depth of 1,270 metres (4,170 ft), it is also one of the most modern underground mines. The deepest borehole in the world is Kola Superdeep Borehole at 12,262 metres (40,230 ft), but this is connected to scientific drilling, not mining.

== Metal reserves and recycling ==
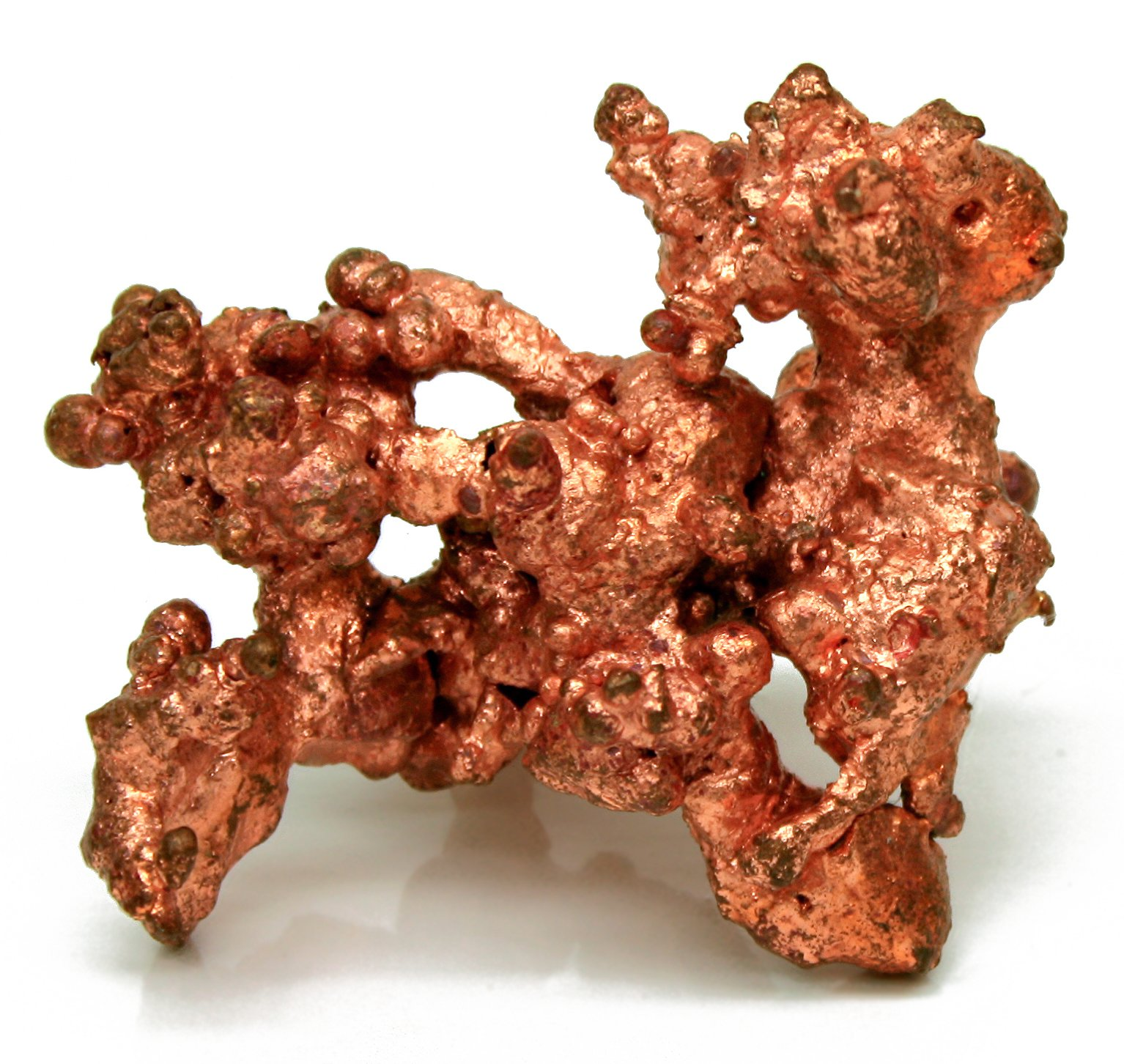
Macro of native copper about 1 1/2 inches (4 cm) in size

During the 20th century, the variety of metals used in society increased. Today, the development of major nations such as China and India, along with technological advances, fuels an ever-greater demand. The result is that metal mining activities are expanding, and more and more of the world's metal stocks are above ground in use rather than below ground as unused reserves. An example is the in-use stock of copper. Between 1932 and 1999, copper in use in the US rose from 73 kilograms (161 lb) to 238 kilograms (525 lb) per person.

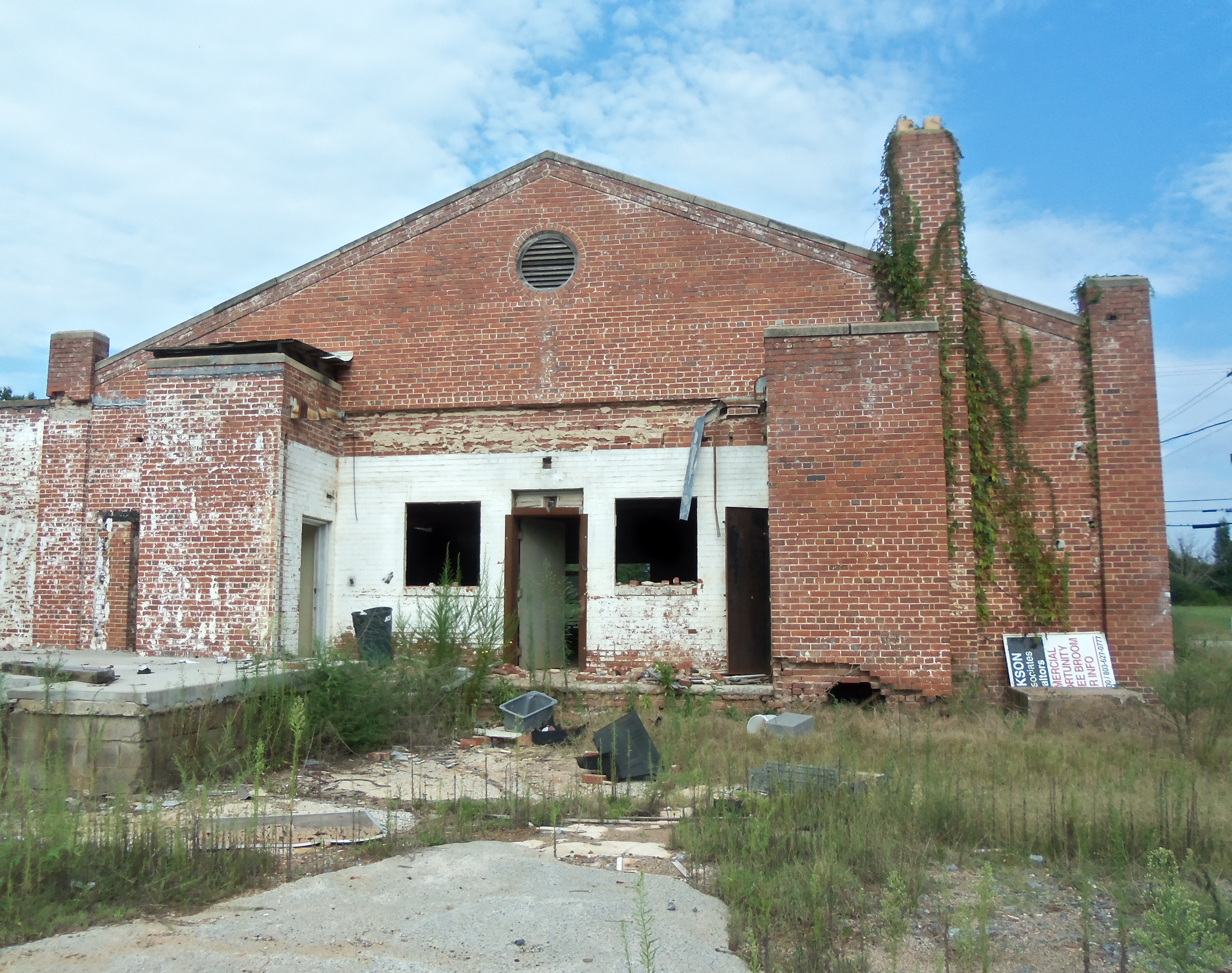
A former metal recycling plant in South Carolina.

95% of the energy used to make aluminium from bauxite ore is saved by using recycled material. However, levels of metal recycling are generally low. In 2010, the International Resource Panel, hosted by the United Nations Environment Programme (UNEP), published reports on metal stocks that exist within society and their recycling rates.

The report's authors observed that the metal stocks in society can serve as substantial anthropogenic mines above ground. However, they warned that the recycling rates of some rare metals used in applications such as mobile phones, battery packs for hybrid cars, and fuel cells are so low that unless future end-of-life recycling rates are dramatically stepped up these critical metals will become unavailable for use in modern technology.

As recycling rates are low and so much metal has already been extracted, some landfill now contain higher concentrations of metal than the mines themselves. This is especially true of aluminum, used in cans, and precious metals, found in discarded electronics. Furthermore, waste after 15 years has still not broken down, so less processing would be required when compared to mining ores. A study undertaken by Cranfield University has found £360 million of metals could be mined from just four landfill sites. There is also up to 20 MJ/kg of energy in waste, potentially making the re-extraction more profitable. However, although the first landfill mine opened in Tel Aviv, Israel in 1953, little work has followed due to the abundance of accessible ores.

== See also ==
- Asteroid mining – Exploitation of raw materials from asteroids
- Automated mining – Removal of human labor from the mining industry
- Blood diamond – Diamond mined in conflict areas
- Conflict resource – War fought over resources
- Deep sea mining
- Environmental effects of mining – Environmental problems from uncontrolled mining
- Extractive Industries Transparency Initiative – Organization of countries
- Geological engineering – Discipline applying geological science
- Kimberley Process Certification Scheme – Process to certify the origin of rough diamonds
- List of critical mineral raw materials – European Union legislation
- List of mining companies
- List of mining journals
- Mining engineering – Engineering discipline
- Outline of mining – Overview of and topical guide to mining
- Peak minerals – Depletion of natural organic and inorganic resources
- Resource curse – Theory that resource wealth slows growth
- Resource extraction – Resources that exist without actions of humankind
- Stone industry – Place where geological material has been excavated
