= Mining archaeology in the British Isles =

Mining archaeology is a specific field well-developed in the British Isles during recent decades. A reason of ongoing interest in this field is the particular bond between regional history and the exploitation of metals. References to mines in the area exist in Strabo's works. However the first accomplished study on the topic was attempted by Oliver Davies in 1935. Other momentous researches were that of geologist John S. Jackson about mines in Ireland and Lewis, Jones in Dolaucothi goldmine in Wales, and the pioneering work of Ronald F. Tylecote. Moreover, in the 1980s and 1990s a new generation of amateurs and scientists began investigations in different locations in the British Isles, including Duncan James on the Great Orme's Head, Simon Timberlake with the Early Mines Research Group at sites in Wales and William O'Brien in Ireland.

== Prehistory ==
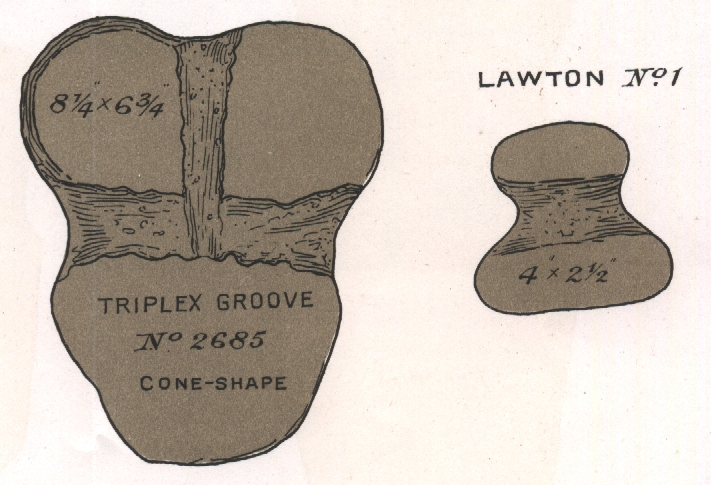
Hammerstones

Signs of Bronze Age metal extraction have been identified from several locations in the British Isles; this has been certified with carbon-14 analysis. Oliver Davies has accomplished the most intensive archaeological investigation in central Wales at Cwmystwyth. The first investigation conducted in 1935, however in 1986 a group of scientists instituted the Early Mines Research Group and reinvestigate the Copa Hill region including Cwmystwyth. Even though lead deposits are the main concentration the first metal extracted in the area was copper. The main lead lode is at "Comet lode" where a large opencast was excavated. At the walls of the opencast, revealed entrances of tunnels, which were constructed to follow smaller veins. At one of them, a wooden "pipe" was found. Moreover, in the same area a considerable amount of dump was exposed including stone hammers and lead ores. Charcoal samples from the site give several different dates from 2000–1900 BC to 1400 BC.

Other two significant sites are Parys Mountain on Anglesey and Nantyreira mine located in mid-Wales. Copper was the reason for their early exploitation even if Nantyreira's main lode contained predominantly lead ores. S.Timberlake and the Early Mines Research Group in 1986 explored them. The excavations had as a result the discovery of dump in both sites. Charcoal and stonehammers were found inside the tip. The C14 samples place both areas at the Early Bronze Age 2000–1500 BC.

The Great Orme mine exploitation, on the North Wales coast began in the Bronze Age and continued until the nineteenth century. According to remains, mine workings have been traced in the Bryniau, Poethion and Pyllau valley. The dolomitised limestone deposits are rich in copper which early miners must extract mostly by malachite. Because of ground composition, the extraction was sufficiently easy, this explains also the scale of the operations. In 1976 Duncan James revealed in Great Orme a shaft which included a firesetting in connection with stone hammers, bone tools and rock dump. The deposit was placed by radiocarbon-dating to 1395–935 BC. Andy Lewis continued the research in the area at the late 1980s. It is believed that the operations in the location ended shortly after 1000 BC. Extractions techniques with visible remains are the opencasts at the surface and group of caverns and underground shafts. The underground system was accessible by many different openings which simultaneously used as a ventilation system for the tunnels. The tools in the site constitute mainly by pointed bone tools and stonehammers. Other stone tools revealed at the locations were stone mortars and pestles, which indicate another stage in the ores exploitation. Moreover, a unique find for British Isles were the giant hammers.

Evidence for early quarrying was also discovered in Alderley Edge though industrial operations in the 19th century destroyed a big part of the earlier deposits.

Ireland also has many areas related with mining activities from the prehistoric period (O'Brien 2003). However, the two important mines are Mount Gabriel and Ross Island mines. Ross Island lies near Killarney. Inside its area they have been exposed two primitive mines. O'Brien excavate "Danish mines" and revealed a mine cave and a huge spoil concentration nearby thus after the excavation of the latter, another unknown mine also appeared. Furthermore, he investigates pits and dips in the bedrock, which also considered primitive. The feature that differentiates this site is the discovery of a Beaker settlement very close with metallurgical pits, hammers and rock waste. This finds in combination with an early phase in 2400 BC makes the site and the settlement very important for mining Archaeology in the British Isles.

Mount Gabriel located close to west Cork provides useful evidence for the exploitation of copper ore in the Early Bronze Age about 1700 BC. Through research thirty-two areas of activity were underlined. Shallow concaves and significant amount of dump with charcoal and tools are the evidences of Bronze Age copper extraction in the region. Mount Gabriel constitute until now the only locations, where primitive assemblages remained undisturbed by 19th century deeds due to the low quality of its veins.

With the beginning of the Iron Age about 700 BC operations associated with ore exploitations spread around the British Isles. A representative example of the period are Puzzlewood's surface mines. The site prospered especially in the Romano-British period and the late Middle Ages. The limonite ores represent a small part of the local Carboniferous Limestone. The archaeological remains of mining which can be detected in the area are opencasts, known as scowles. It's important to underline the discovery of habitations areas in close proximity, dated around 100–400 AD.

== Roman period ==
During the Roman period massive veins exploitation took part in the Mendips and Dolaucothi . Further metallic lead pigs originate from Peak District in Derbyshire has been discovered but the exact position of the mines remains unknown.

It is possible that the Mendip sources were already exploited in Late Bronze Age and some evidence earthworks are associated with British Iron Age activity, but the peak of production is linked with Roman era. Even if we do not have many actual evidences about the mines, through the examination of the archaeological sites in the area is known to us that the Charterhouse Roman Town were guarded by a fort and similar conditions may occurred in Green mines also at least for a period.

=== Dolaucothi ===
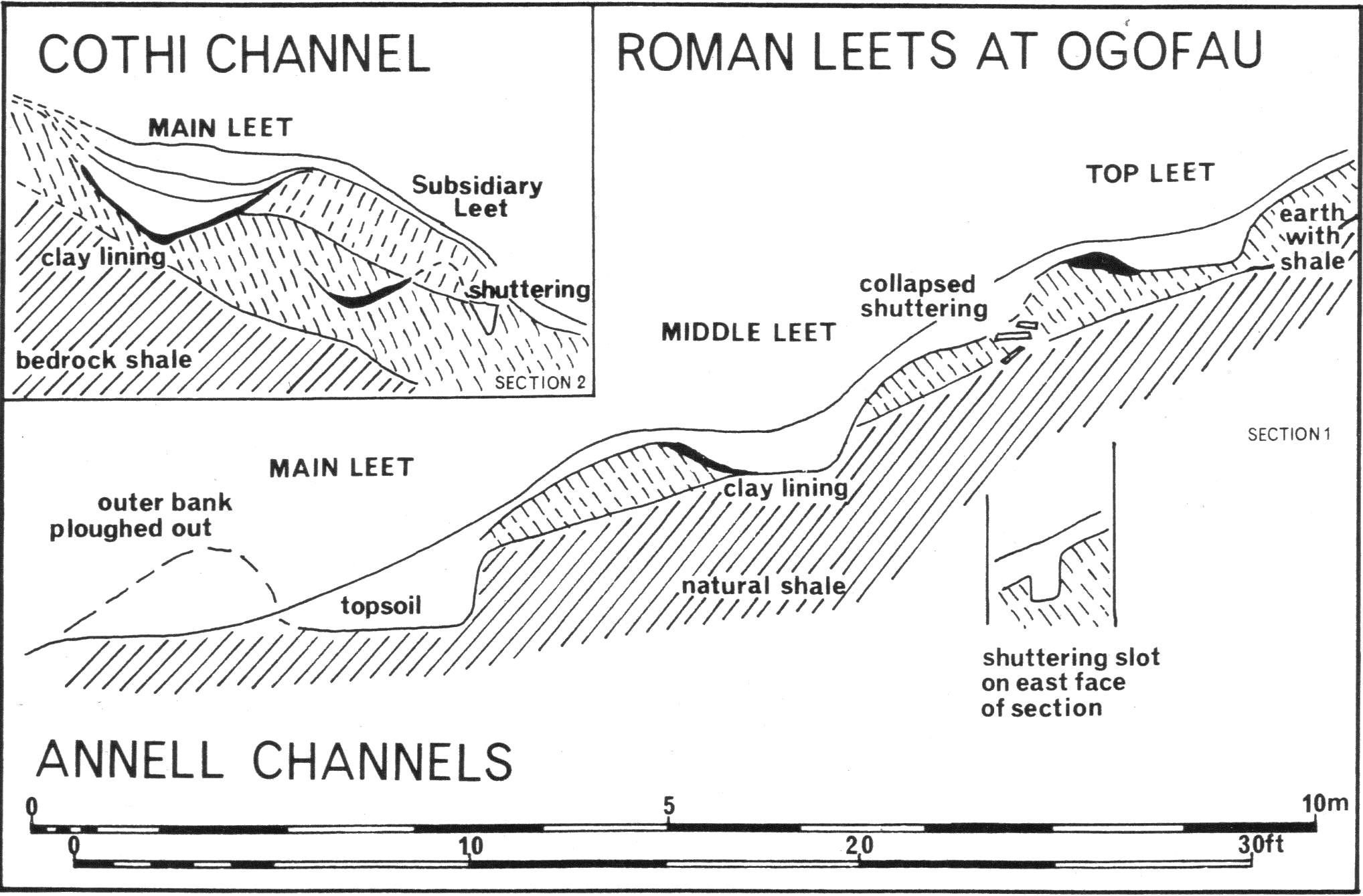
The aqueducts at Dolaucothi

Though the most acquainted site is the Dolaucothi Gold Mines near Pumpsaint in Wales. The gold mines were investigated by Jones and Lewis in 1969. The mines were in use until nowadays and their utilisation is obvious towards the surface of the site but also underground. The Roman presence in the area is dated from the beginning of their establishment in Great Britain and for a period of 300 years. The remains of mine workings former than 19th century are concentrated in five areas Ogofau, Niagara, Allt Cwmhenog, Pen-lan-wen and Cwrt-y-Cillion trenches. Furthermore, in the Ogofau region a number of pits came to light. Despite the concentrations of dump and posterior workings the opencasts of Roman period are visible and well preserved. The main one had preserved a depth of 24 metres at least other two opencasts are dated in the same period the co-called "Roman pit" and the "Mitchell pit". Likewise a second location with possible Roman dated exploration is Pen-lan-wen where a group of adits was found, traces of chisels and picks were obvious at the surfaces of the ambit's walls but the evidence are tenuous.

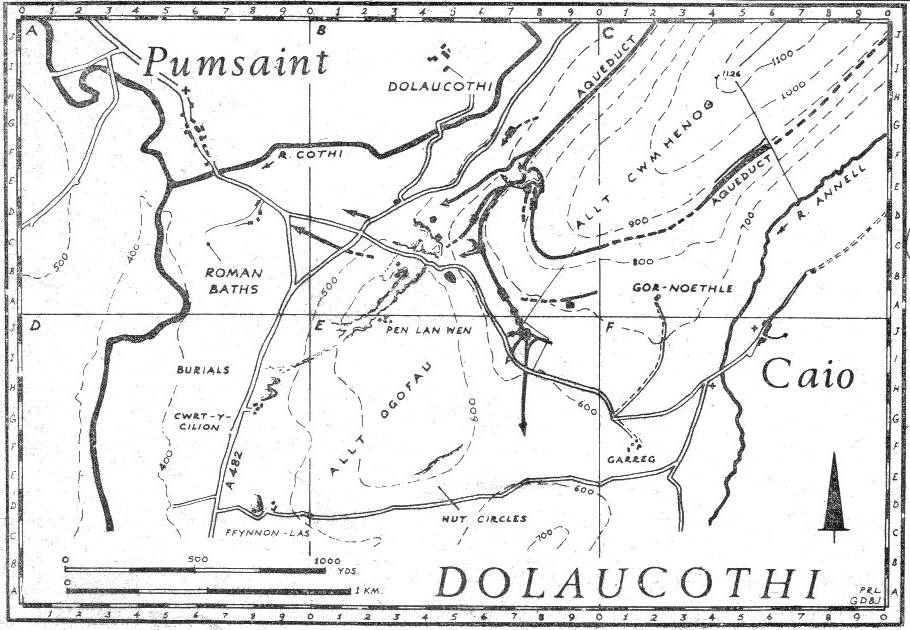
Map of the gold mine

Undoubtedly the most striking feature of Dolaucothi mines is the constructions linked with hushing. Through the excavations by Lewis and Jones four main leats, a complex group of tanks and reservoirs were revealed in different areas either in direct vicinity with the mines or nearby water sources. Another crucial discovery was the fragment of a "drainage wheel", suggesting the existence of an underground wheel system similar to the well-known system of Rio Tinto in Spain.

== Middle Ages ==
The Middle Ages was a flourishing period for the exploitations of metal in general, a prime mover for this was the inference of monasteries in extraction of minerals. A famous archaeological site of this period is the northern Pennines at Brownhill, Cumbria, where lead ores were extracted from argentiferous lodes. The mine was under the jurisdiction of the Crown. The lead ores were obtained by opencasts that took a semi-ellipsoid shape thus they called "bell-pits". Evidences of medieval exploitation are preserved also at Copa hill were small parts of a leat system came to light. Further Ross Island excavations displayed a smelting site connected with a settlement nearby the local mines but the contemporary workings are untraceable. As far as tin industry concerns "lode back pits" at Godolphin have identified as medieval.

== The contribution of other fields in mining archaeology ==
To shape an overall image for mines in antiquity we have to consider in mind many different factors not only the architectural remains. Social context is one of these factors. The term includes the social status of the miners, their way of life, the relationships with adjoined communities due to archaeological record, the symbolic value of the ore which was reflected also at the finished objects and in general to recreate the past society in which these operations took part. Yet in collaboration with experimental archaeology important observations have occur as far as primitive techniques of extraction and their traceable residues or ways in which mining tools were used their properties and the distinctive marks of their usages. Moreover, scientific analytical methods can submit important data about chemical composition of minerals, slag and artefacts allowing archaeologists to build correlations or identify provenance. Further the science of geology and pollen analysis can give us an image of landscape per eras. Finally documents and inscriptions as well offer valuable help for the historical periods.

== Bibliography ==
- Craddock B. 1990. The experimental hafting of stone mining hammers. In Crew P. and Crew S.(eds), Early Mining in the British Isles ( Proceedings of the EarlyMiningWorkshop at Plas Tan y Bwlch Snowdonia National Park Study Centre, 17–19 November 1989). Blaenau Ffestiniog: Plas Tan y Bwlch Snowdonia National Park Study Centre, Occasional Paper No.1, 58–74.
- Ellis P. 1992. Mendip Hills: An Archaeological Survey of the Area of Outstanding Natural Beauty. Somerset: English Heritage & Somerset County Council.
- Gerrard, S. 2000. The early British tin industry. Stroud: Tempus.
- Graddock P.T.,1991. Mining and Smelting in Antiquity. In: S.Bowman, Science and the Past. London: The Trustees of the British Museum, 57–73.
- Graddock P.T., 1995. Early Metal Mining and Production. Edinburgh: Edinburgh University Press Ltd.
- Grew P. 1990. Firesetting experiment at RHIW GOCH, 1989. In Crew P. and Crew S.(eds), Early Mining in the British Isles ( Proceedings of the Early Mining Workshop at Plas Tan y Bwlch Snowdonia National Park Study Centre, 17–19 November 1989). Blaenau Ffestiniog: Plas Tan y Bwlch Snowdonia National Park Study Centre, Occasional Paper No.1, 57.
- Hall G.1990. Reflections of the difficulties of early miners in Wales. In Crew P. and Crew S.(eds), Early Mining in the British Isles ( Proceedings of the Early Mining Workshop at Plas Tan y Bwlch Snowdonia National Park Study Centre, 17–19 November 1989). Blaenau Ffestiniog:Plas Tan y Bwlch Snowdonia National Park Study Centre, Occasional Paper No1,78
- Henderson J., 2000. The science and archaeology of materials: an investigation of inorganic materials. London: Routledge.
- James D.1988. Prehistoric Copper Mining on the Great Ormes Head, Llandudno, Cwynedd. In Jones J. E. (ed), Aspects of ancient mining and metallurgy : acta of a British School at Athens centenary conference at Bangor,1986. Bangor : Dept. of Classics, University College of North Wales, 115–121.
- The Institute of Metals (ed.),1991. Early metallurgical sites in Great Britain: BC 2000 to AD 1500. London. The Institute of Metals and The Institute of Metals North American Publications Centre.
- Lewis A. 1990. Firesetting experiments on the Great Orme's head in 1989. Review of the historical evidences of the use of firesetting. In Crew P. and Crew S.(eds), Early Mining in the British Isles ( Proceedings of the Early Mining Workshop at Plas Tan y Bwlch Snowdonia National Park Study Centre, 17–19 November 1989). Blaenau Ffestiniog:Plas Tan y Bwlch Snowdonia National Park Study Centre, Occasional Paper No1, 55–56.
- O'Brien W. 1994. MOUNT GABRIEL Bronze Age Mining in Ireland. Galway: Galway University Press.
- O'Brien W. 1996. Bronze Age copper mining in Britain and Ireland. Buckinghamshire: Shire Publications Ltd.
- O'Brien W. 2003. THE BRONZE AGE COPPER MINES OF THE GOLEEN AREA, CO. CORK . Proceedings of the Royal Irish Academy, Vol. 103C, No. 2, 13–59.
- O'Brien W. 2004. ROSS ISLAND: Mining, Metal and Society in Early Ireland. Galway:Department of Archaeology, National University of Ireland. Bronze Age Studies 6.
- Pinkin J. 1990. Stone tools and early metal mining in England and Wales. In Crew P. and Crew S.(eds), Early Mining in the British Isles ( Proceedings of the Early Mining Workshop at Plas Tan y Bwlch Snowdonia National Park Study Centre, 17–19 November 1989). Blaenau Ffestiniog:Plas Tan y Bwlch Snowdonia National Park Study Centre, Occasional Paper No1, 39–42.
- Richardson J.B., 1974. Metal Mining. London: Allen Lane Penguin Books Ltd.
- Shepherd R., 1980. Prehistoric Mining and Allied Industries. London: Academic Press INC Ltd London.
- Timberlake S. 1990. Excavations and fieldwork on COPA HILL, CWMYSTWYTH, 1989 . In Crew P. and Crew S.(eds), Early Mining in the British Isles ( Proceedings of the Early Mining Workshop at Plas Tan y Bwlch Snowdonia National Park Study Centre, 17–19 November 1989). Blaenau Ffestiniog:Plas Tan y Bwlch Snowdonia National Park Study Centre, Occasional Paper No1,22–29.
- Timberlake S. 1990. Excavations at PARYS MOUNTAIN and NANTYREIRA. In Crew P. and Crew S.(eds), Early Mining in the British Isles ( Proceedings of the Early Mining Workshop at Plas Tan y Bwlch Snowdonia National Park Study Centre, 17–19 November 1989). Blaenau Ffestiniog:Plas Tan y Bwlch Snowdonia National Park Study Centre, Occasional Paper No1, 15–21.
- Timberlake S. 1990. Review of the historical evidences of the use of firesetting. In Crew P. and Crew S.(eds), Early Mining in the British Isles ( Proceedings of the Early Mining Workshop at Plas Tan y Bwlch Snowdonia National Park Study Centre, 17–19 November 1989). Blaenau Ffestiniog:Plas Tan y Bwlch Snowdonia National Park Study Centre, Occasional Paper No1, 53–54
- Timberlake, S., 2003. Early Mining Research in Britain: The developments of the last ten years. In P.T. Graddock and J.Lang, Mining and Metal Production: Through The Ages. London: The Trustees of the British Museum, 21–42.
- Timberlake S., 2003. Excavations on Copa Hill, Cwmystwyth (1986–1999): An Early Bronze Age copper mine within the uplands of Central Wales. Oxford: Archaeopress. BAR British Series; 348.
- Timberlake, S. and Prag A.J.N.W., 2005. The Archaeology of Alderley Edge: Survey, excavation and experiment in an ancient mining landscape. Oxford: John and Erica Hedges Ltd. for the Manchester Museum and the National Trust BAR British Series; 396. doi:10.30861/9781841717159
- Topping P. and Lynott M. 2005. Miners and mines. In Topping P. and Lynott M.(eds), Society for American Archaeology. Meeting (66th : 2001 : New Orleans, La.): The cultural landscape of prehistoric mines. Oxford : Oxbow, 180–191.
- Tuck C. and Topping P. 2005.Virtually Prehistoric: Seeing beneath the Surface at Grime's Graves Neolithic flint mines, Norfolk. In Topping P. and Lynott M.(eds), Society for American Archaeology. Meeting (66th : 2001 : New Orleans, La.): The cultural landscape of prehistoric mines. Oxford : Oxbow,192–197.
- Tylecote R. F., 1964. Roman Lead Working in Britain. The British Journal for the History of Science, Vol. 2, No.1, pp. 25–43
