= Pumsaint =

Village in Carmarthenshire, Wales

Coordinates: 52°02′50″N 3°57′39″W

- Village
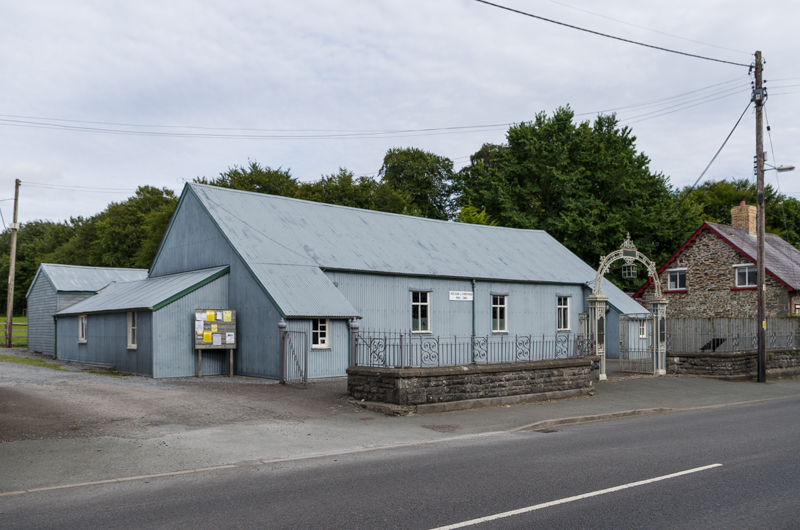
- Pumsaint Coronation Hall

- Location within Carmarthenshire
- Principal area: Carmarthenshire
- Preserved county: Dyfed
- Country: Wales
- Sovereign state: United Kingdom
- Police: Dyfed-Powys
- Fire: Mid and West Wales
- Ambulance: Welsh

Pumsaint is a village in Carmarthenshire, Wales, halfway between Llanwrda and Lampeter on the A482 in the valley of Afon Cothi. It forms part of the extensive estate of Dolaucothi, which is owned by the National Trust.

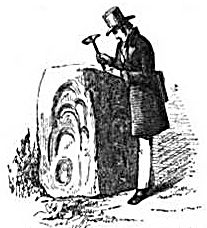
Carreg Pumsaint

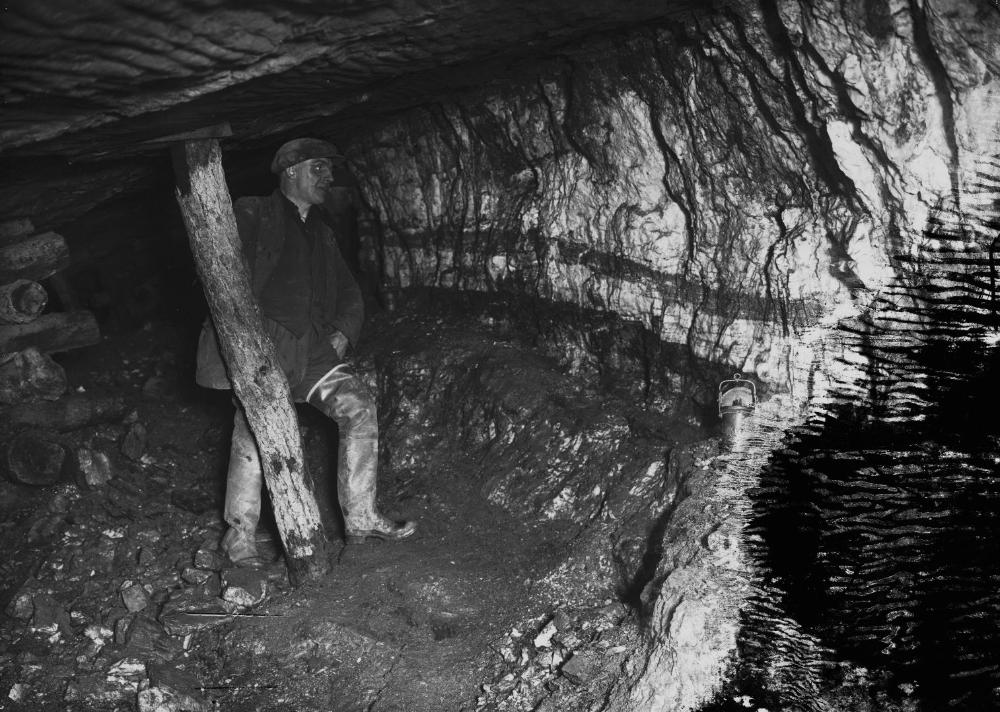
A miner underground at Pumsaint gold mine Wales; c. 1938?.

The name is Welsh for "five saints" (pump being the word for "five"). The name is derived from the stone block at the nearby gold mines, opposite Ogofau Lodge, which has four sides, each of which has hollows probably caused by pestle impacts. It was used as an anvil for crushing gold ore in the Roman period. Excavations in the 1990s of the area adjacent to the stone showed that the stone was originally horizontal and used as an anvil for a water-powered crushing mill. There are many parallels from Spanish mines of the Roman period with similar stone anvils.

== Places of interest ==
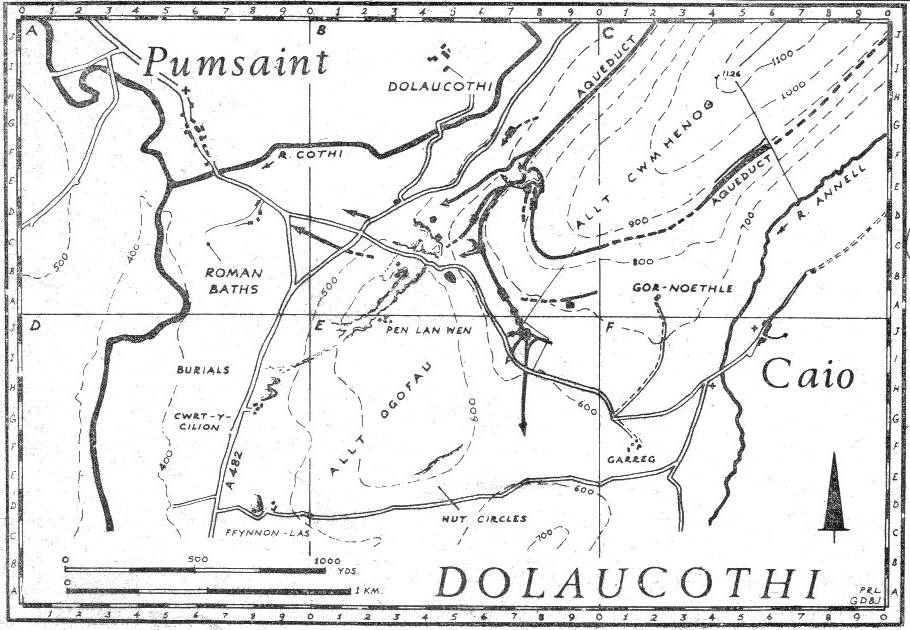
Map of the gold mine

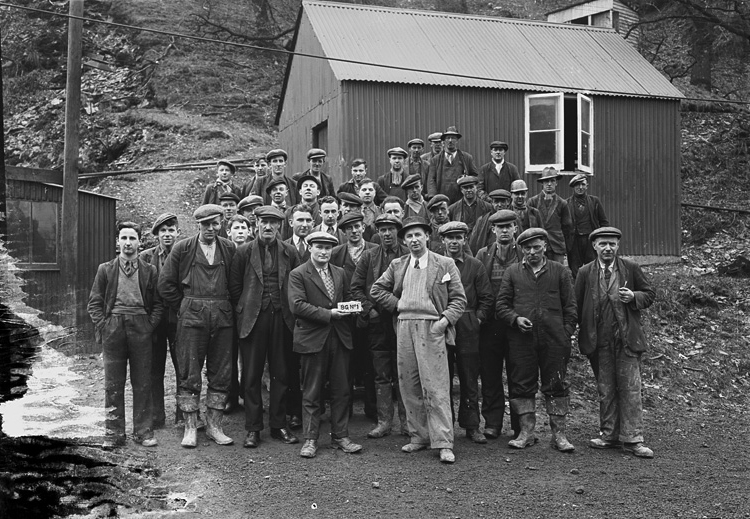
Miners at Pumsaint gold mine, 1938

The nearby conservation area has several scheduled monuments including the Dolaucothi Gold Mines. Archaeologists have uncovered evidence of Roman occupation of the area, including Roman aqueducts, numerous tanks, cisterns and reservoirs, timber buildings and a fort. There are extensive unground mines, that were in use until 1938.

Archaeology suggests that gold extraction on this site may have started sometime in the Bronze Age, possibly by washing of the gold-bearing gravels of Afon Cothi, the most elementary type of gold prospecting. Sextus Julius Frontinus was sent into Roman Britain in 74 AD to succeed Quintus Petillius Cerialis as governor. He subdued the Silures, Demetae and other hostile tribes of Roman Wales, establishing a new base at Caerleon for Legio II Augusta and a network of smaller Roman forts 15 to 20 kilometres apart for his Roman auxiliary units. During his tenure, he probably established the fort at Pumsaint in west Wales, largely to exploit the gold deposits at Dolaucothi. Frontinus later restored the Aqueducts of Rome.

That gold occurred here is shown by the discovery of a hoard of gold ornaments in the 18th century. Objects found included a wheel brooch and snake bracelets, so named because they were soft enough to be coiled around the arm for display. All the objects are now held in the British Museum, and displayed in the Romano-British gallery. A sample of gold ore was found at the site by Henry de la Beche in 1844, confirming the presence of gold.

Evidence from the fort (known as Luentinum from details given by Ptolemy) and vicus show that the Romans worked the mine during the first and second centuries AD (from c. AD 78 until around AD 125), judging by the occupation of the fort. However coarse ware and Samian ware pottery recovered from a reservoir (Melin-y-Milwyr) within the mine complex show that activity at the mines continued until the late third century at least. Since Ptolemy's map dates to about 150 AD, it is likely then that it continued being worked until the end of the third century if not beyond. The Romans made extensive use of water carried by several aqueducts and leats (the longest of which is about 7 miles (11 km) from its source in a gorge of the river) to prospect for the gold veins hidden beneath the soil on the hillsides above the modern village of Pumsaint. Small streams on Mynydd Mallaen, the Annell and Gwenlais, were used initially to provide water for prospecting, and there are several large tanks for holding the water still visible above an isolated opencast pit carved in the side of the hill north of the main site. The water was used in a method known as hushing, where a wave is released to sweep soil and sub-soil away to reveal bare rock. The method was also used to remove as rock debris after a vein was attacked using tools and fire-setting to produce the opencast. The larger aqueduct from the Cothi crosses this opencast, proving the opencast to be earlier.

== Other attractions ==
Other places of interest include the National trust Visitor Centre, located in the Old Coach House in the centre of the village, where displays of the local dolaucothi estate history is displayed along with information on the oak woodlands, the traditional nesting place of the red kite, may be viewed. To the north up the Cothi valley and across the watershed into the Towy valley lies the large dam of Llyn Brianne and the wilderness beyond is good pony trekking country.

The area is a popular place for caravan, fishing and riding holidays.

== See also ==
- Caio, Carmarthenshire
- River Towy
