= Westgarth Forster =

British geologist (1772–1835)

Westgarth Forster (1772–1835) was a British geologist and mining engineer, mine agent at Allenheads and Coalcleugh (Northumberland) mines over two decades and then a consultant surveyor and author. He was the son of a mining engineer, Westgarth Forster the elder, and was born in Coalcleugh, Northumberland.

== Author ==
He is known principally as the author of a book called A Treatise on a Section of the Strata from Newcastle-upon-Tyne to the Mountain of Cross Fell in Cumberland. The first edition (1809) is very rare; his work is known mainly from the greatly enlarged second edition (1821). A third edition was published in 1883, which was, however, much revised and modified by its editor, the Rev. W. Nall.

The work describes the Carboniferous strata in the north-east in their vertical sequence as discovered during mining operations and discusses their lateral variations. It presents the first long composite stratigraphic section at the scale of an entire geological system, representing over 1000 m of section, combining mine records between Cross Fell and Byker, Newcastle. This was a remarkable achievement at the time, prior to the availability of geological maps. General chapters in the first edition borrow extensively from earlier works, including descriptions of approaches to prospecting for ore and developing mineral veins (partially adapting earlier texts to the northern Pennines context). For example, the method of hushing from dams built high on the hillsides is discussed. There are numerous remains of such dams in many British ore-fields and the method was even used to expose section during a 1963–1967 geological survey in the area.

The much-expanded second edition of 1821 cemented Forster's reputation and was subscribed to by a number of eminent scientists (including Sir Joseph Banks, President of the Royal Society) and many orefield mine agents. The Commissioners and Governors of the Royal Hospital for Seamen at Greenwich ordered 30 copies in fine. William Buckland of Oxford University contributed an insert with the title "Order of Superposition of Strata in the British Isles."

== Pre-1809 ==
Turner (1793) reported on a visit to Allenheads where the Westgarth Forsters, father and son, showed him "various plans and sections illustrative of the position and quality of the strata, the course of the veins, and the various mining operations." He wrote of Westgarth Forster junior as follows, "I cannot help here congratulating the Society upon the expectation they may reasonably form of much information and entertainment from the communications of this ingenious young man, for whose nomination as an honorary member, we are much obliged to the gentleman who proposed him." Turner (1793) saw the draft form of Forster's "nearly finished" section "of the strata which comprises the mining country to the depth of 500 fathoms." The section was not published until 1809, however, but now part of a much longer composite general section for the Carboniferous of the Alston Block.

Wilkinson (1997) was able to fill in many details from the years before 1809, making extensive use of the Blackett Lead Company archives. He recorded that Westgarth Forster senior was officially employed at Coalcleugh on 10 June 1771 and that Westgarth Forster junior was born at Coalcleugh. In 1775 Westgarth Forster senior was installed at Allenheads, ready for the start of the July–September quarter, at a salary of £60 per annum.

== Tribute ==
A tribute to Forster, penned by Nall, appeared in the third edition:

Though nearly half a century has elapsed since the grave closed over Westgarth Forster's remains, his name still continues a household word amongst the people of Alston Moor; he lives in their minds as a clever, though somewhat eccentric man, different in many respects from the ordinary run of men. But it is not only among the Alstonians that his name lives; it is frequently heard in Weardale and Allendale. Local mining agents and local geologists are familiar with it; mining agents and geologists, who have a mining reputation which is more than local, still continue to quote him as an authority on mining and geological questions. His "Section of the Strata" is still the standard work on the geology of the two northern counties. It was never more highly prized by miners than it is now. Though the book was written when the science of geology was in its initial stage; when even people of education recognised no distinction between one kind of rock and another; when such terms as stratified and unstratified, aqueous and igneous, seldom appeared in print, and were scarcely ever heard; when the great works of Buckland, De la Beche, Phillips, Lyell, Murchison, Sedgwick, and other geologists had not yet appeared, the classification of the strata which it contains, is the one still in use. Forster rendered valuable services to the sciences of mining and geology, and for that service, if for no other reason, his name will be remembered for a long time to come. The letters and extracts quoted in this memoir show how upright and honorable he was in his dealings.
