= Dolaucothi Gold Mines =

Historic gold mines in Wales

Dolaucothi gold mines
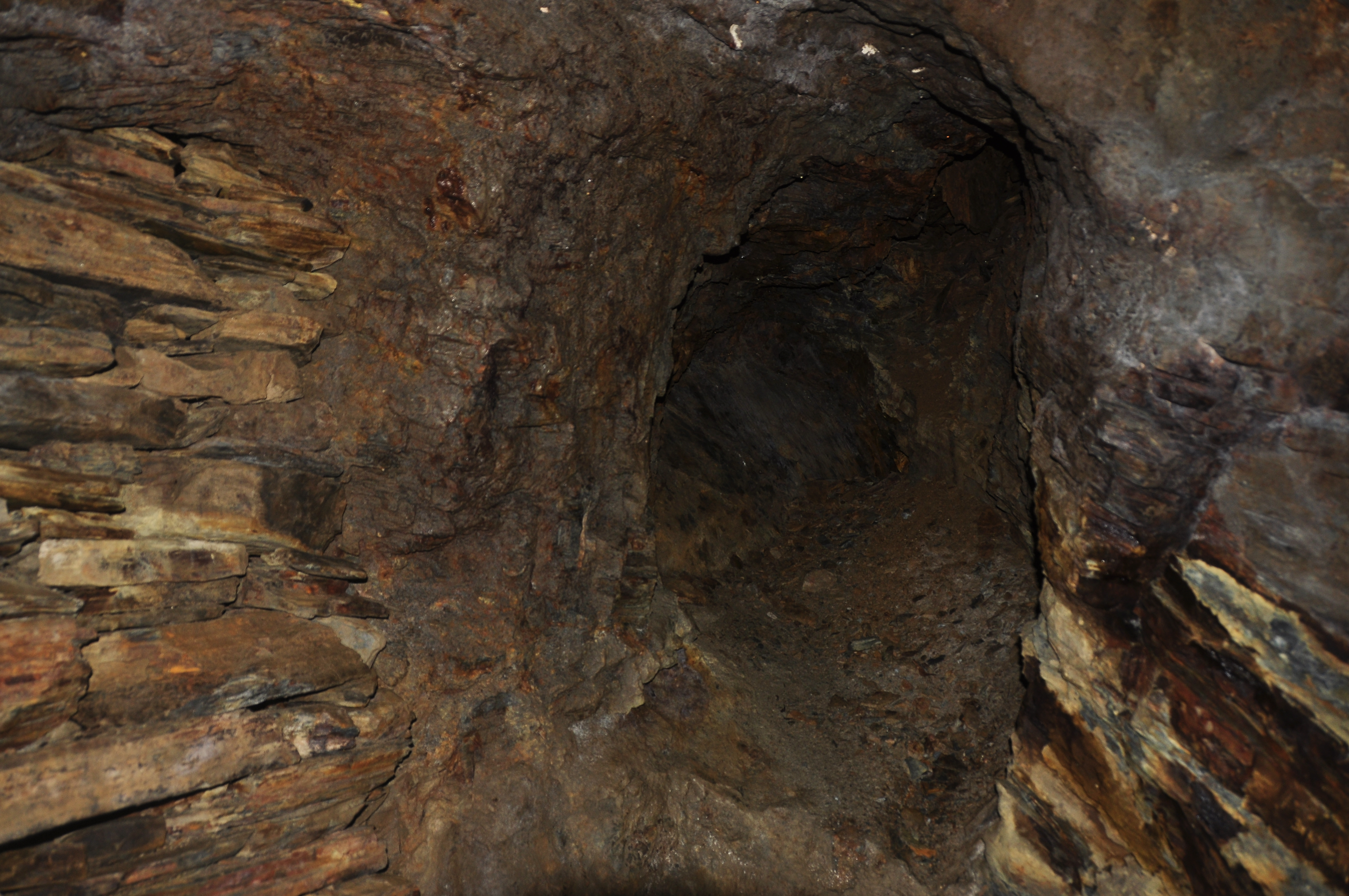
- Roman workings at Dolaucothi mine

- Location within Wales
- Location: Carmarthenshire, Wales; 52°02′41″N 3°56′59″W
- Type: gold
- Company: National Trust
- Website: http://www.nationaltrust.org.uk/dolaucothi-gold-mines

The Dolaucothi Gold Mines (pronounced [ˌdɔlaiˈkɔθɪ]; Welsh: Mwynfeydd Aur Dolaucothi) (grid reference SN662403), also known as the Ogofau Gold Mine, are ancient Roman surface and underground mines located in the valley of the River Cothi, near Pumsaint, Carmarthenshire, Wales. The gold mines are located within the Dolaucothi Estate, which is owned by the National Trust.

They are the only mines for Welsh gold outside those of the Dolgellau gold-belt, and are a Scheduled Ancient Monument. They are also the only known Roman gold mines in Britain, although it does not exclude the likelihood that they exploited other known sources in Devon in South West England, north Wales, Scotland and elsewhere. The site is important for showing advanced Roman technology.

== Roman mining methods ==
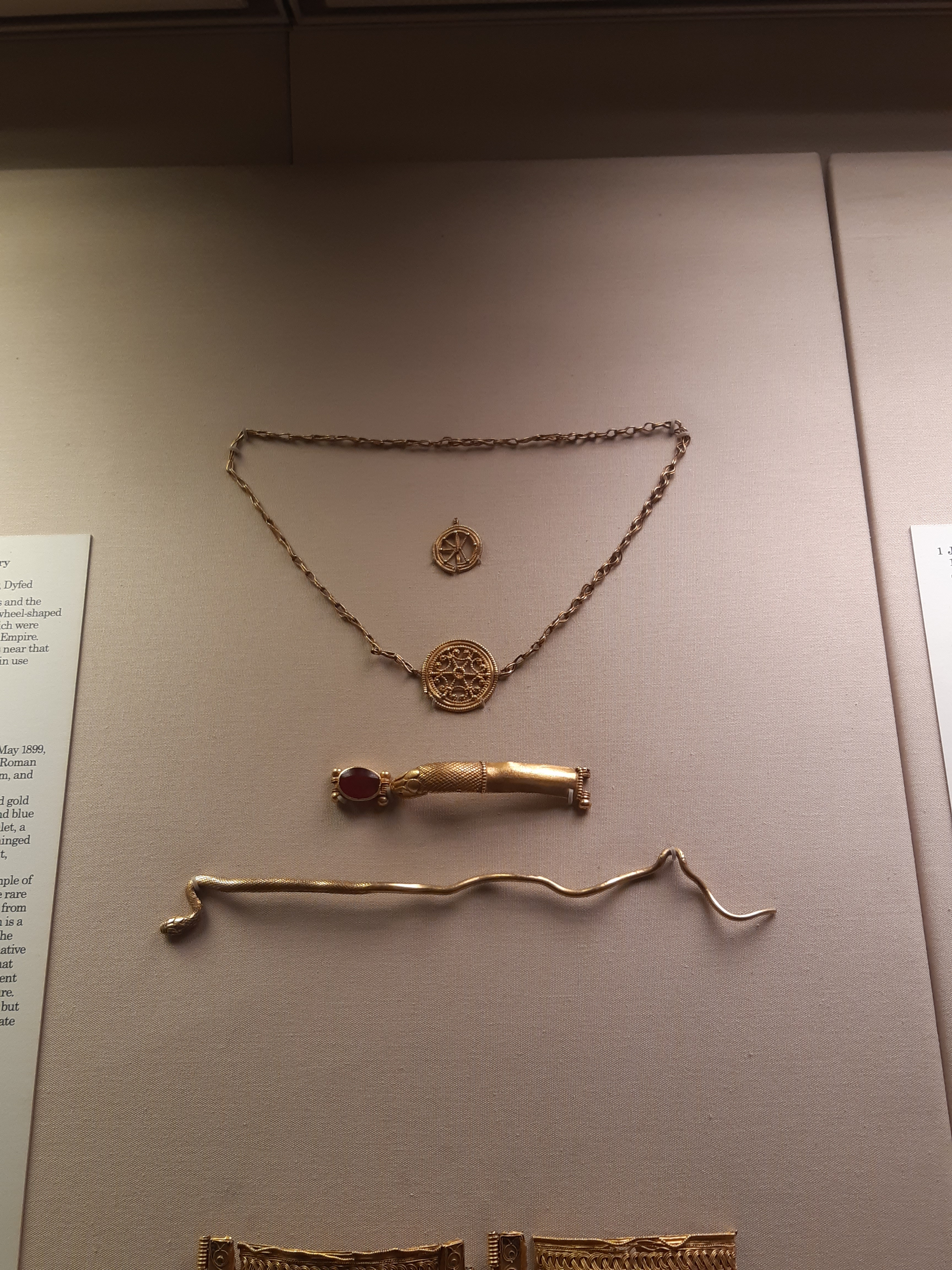
Romano-British jewellery from Dolaucothi in the British Museum

Archaeology suggests that gold extraction on this site may have started sometime in the Bronze Age, possibly by washing of the gold-bearing gravels of the river Cothi, the most elementary type of gold prospecting. Sextus Julius Frontinus was sent into Roman Britain in AD 74 to succeed Quintus Petillius Cerialis as governor of that island. He subdued the Silures, Demetae and other hostile tribes of Roman Wales, establishing a new base at Caerleon for Legio II Augusta and a network of smaller Roman forts approximately nine to twelve miles (fifteen to twenty kilometres) apart for his Roman auxiliary units. During his tenure, he probably established the fort at Pumsaint in west Wales, largely to exploit the gold deposits at Dolaucothi. Frontinus later restored the aqueducts of Rome and wrote the definitive treatise on 1st century Roman aqueducts, the two-volume De aquaeductu.

That gold occurred here is shown by the discovery of a hoard of gold ornaments in the 18th century. Objects found included a wheel brooch and snake bracelets, so named because they were soft enough to be coiled around the arm for display. All the objects are now held in the British Museum, and displayed in the Romano-British gallery. A sample of gold ore was found at the site by Henry De la Beche in 1844, confirming the presence of gold.

Evidence from the fortification (known as Luentinum from details given in Ptolemy's Geographia) and its associated settlement show that the Roman army occupied the fort from c. AD 78 to c. 125. However, coarse ware and Samian ware pottery recovered from a reservoir (Melin-y-Milwyr) within the mine complex show that activity at the mines continued until the late 3rd century at least. Since Ptolemy's map dates to about 150, it is likely that it continued being worked until the end of the 3rd century if not beyond.

=== Hydraulic mining ===
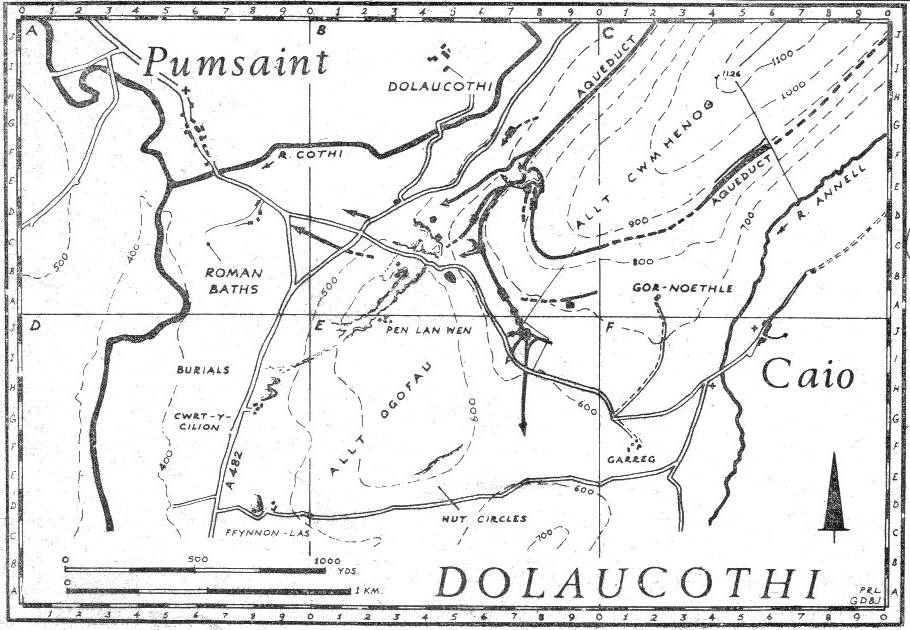
Map of the gold mine

The Romans made extensive use of water carried by several aqueducts and leats, the longest of which is about 7 miles (11 km) from its source in a gorge of the river, to prospect for the gold veins hidden beneath the soil on the hillsides above the modern village of Pumsaint. Small streams on Mynydd Mallaen, the Annell and Gwenlais, were used initially to provide water for prospecting, and there are several large tanks for holding the water still visible above an isolated opencast pit carved in the side of the hill north of the main site. The larger aqueduct from the Cothi crosses this opencast, proving the opencast to be earlier.

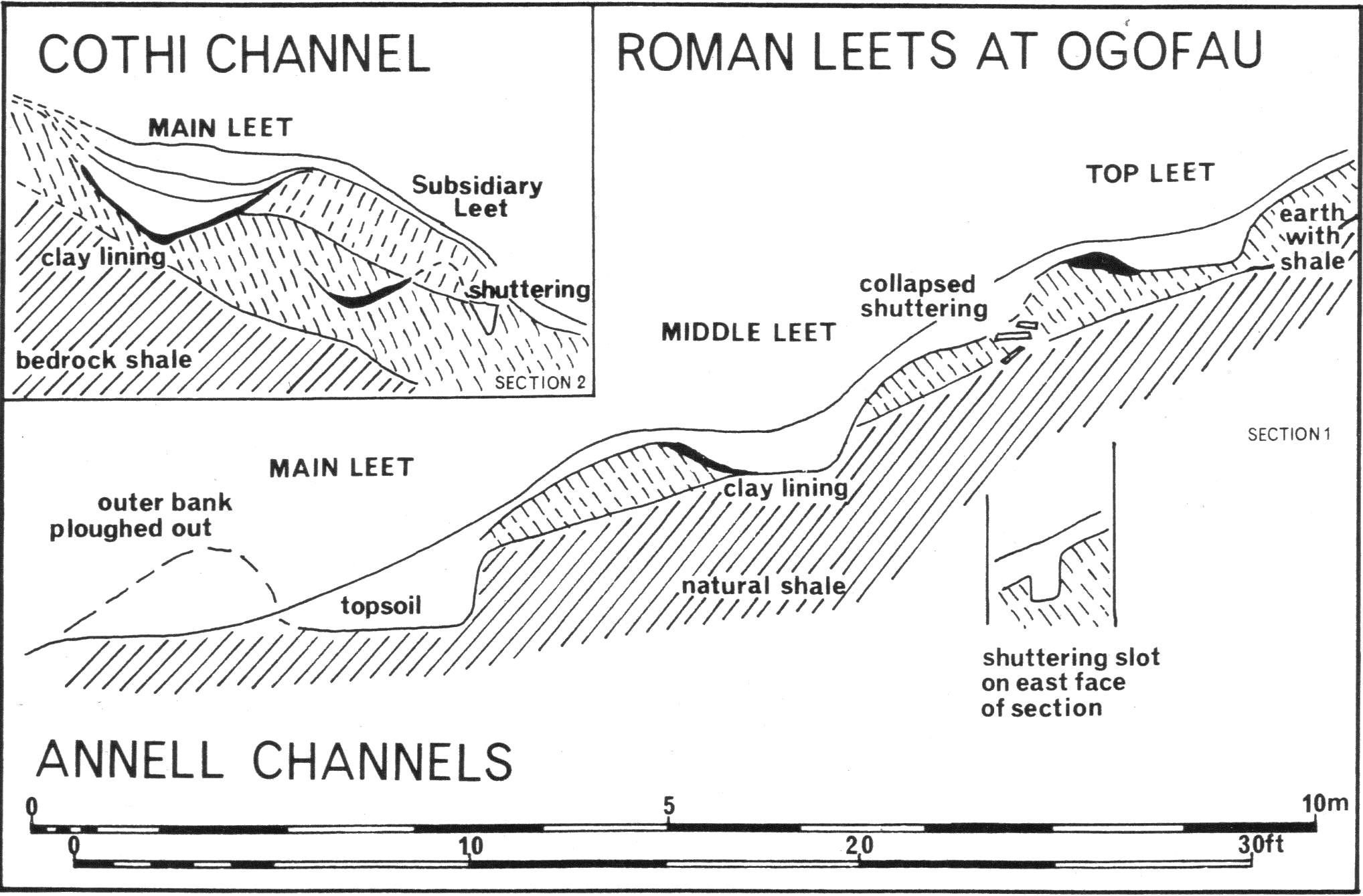
The aqueducts at Dolaucothi

The water was stored in the tanks and then released suddenly, the wave of water sweeping away the soil to reveal the bedrock and any gold-bearing veins beneath. Pliny the Elder gives a dramatic account in his Naturalis historia of the method, possibly derived from his experiences in Spain. The method is known as hushing and survived in use until the 19th century in Britain, and into the 20th century in the goldfields of Africa. A not dissimilar method is used today in exploiting alluvial tin deposits, and is known as hydraulic mining. A smaller scale version of the same method is placer mining, and both may have been used to work alluvial placer deposits next to the river Cothi itself, judging by a large aqueduct which tapped the river a mile or so upstream, and enters the site at a low level compared with the other known aqueducts on the site. The water supply of the aqueducts was also used for washing crushed gold ore, and also possibly driving stamping mills for comminution of the ore (Lewis and Jones, 1969).

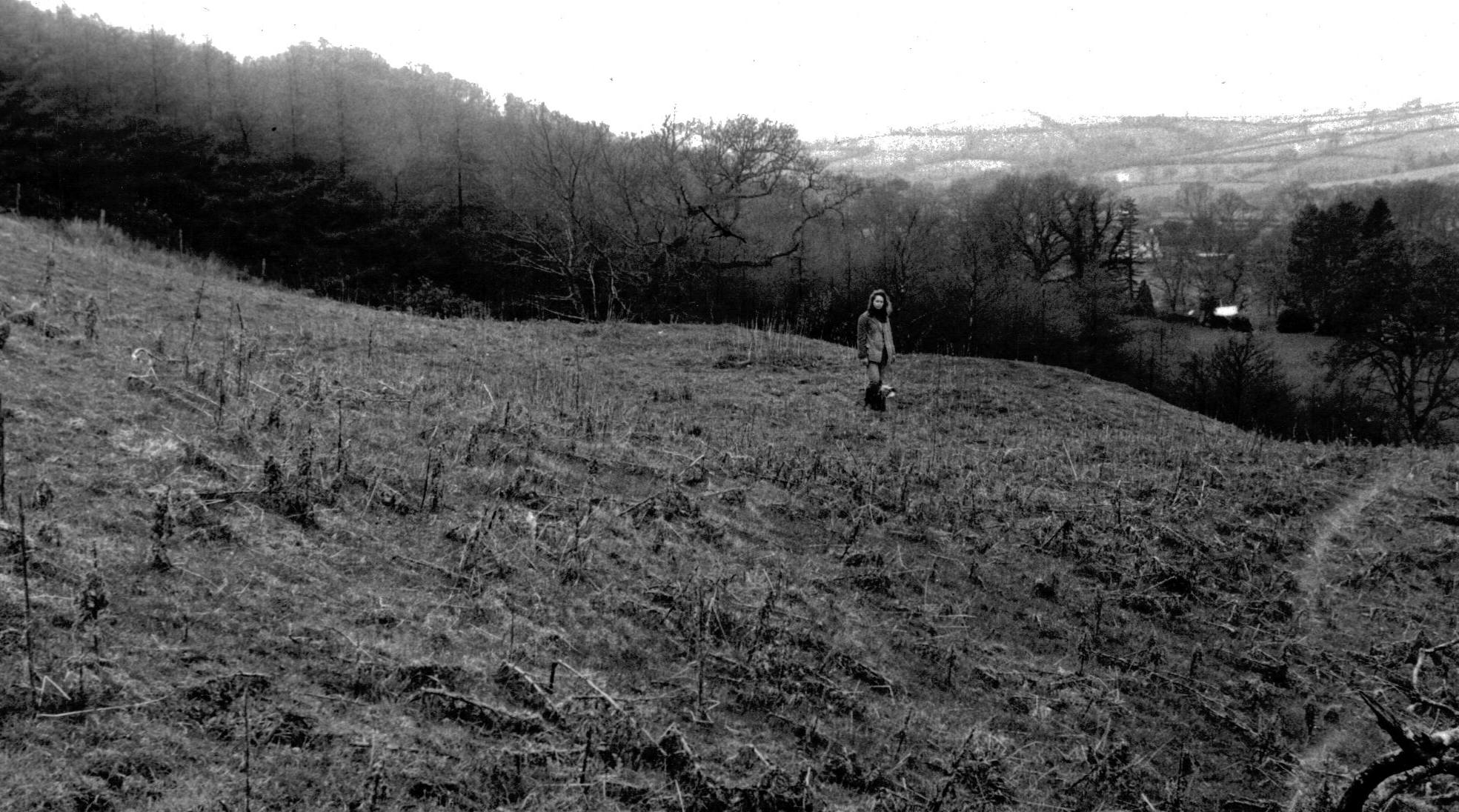
Small tank (A) near north opencast

One of the first aqueducts was built at a high level on the east slope of Allt Cwmhenog and tapped a small stream about 2 miles (3 km) away. There is a large tank at its end, where it sweeps around the brow of the hill onto the west side of the ridge. A gold vein must have been discovered here, because there is a large opencast below the tank. Yet the larger and longer aqueduct (with a gradient of 1 in 800) taps the River Cothi about 7 miles (11 km) to the north-east and traverses the same opencast, so must be later in date.

By contrast, several tanks found on the site did not show a vein, so were abandoned. The tank shown at right occurs not far from the north opencast and was probably intended to find the limits of the deposit located in the adjacent opencast (Tank A in the schematic diagram below). It clearly didn't find the vein, and was thus abandoned. The water supply may have been obtained from a small leat run from a stream up the main Cothi valley before the much larger aqueduct was constructed.

=== Opencast mining ===
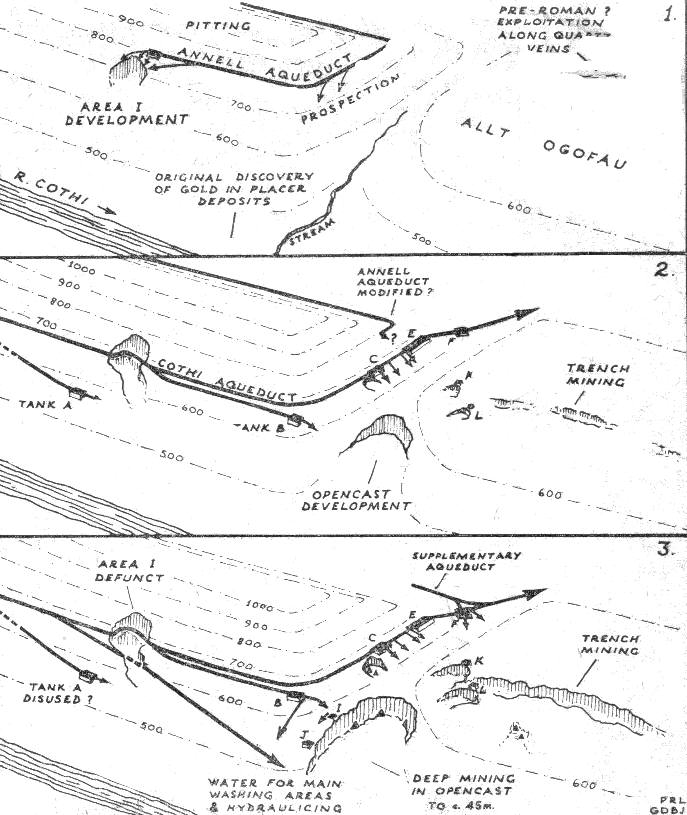
Development of mine

Prospecting was successful and several opencasts are visible below the large tanks built along its length. The only exception is the final and very large tank, below which are two reservoirs. It is likely that this complex was used for washing powdered ore to collect the gold dust.

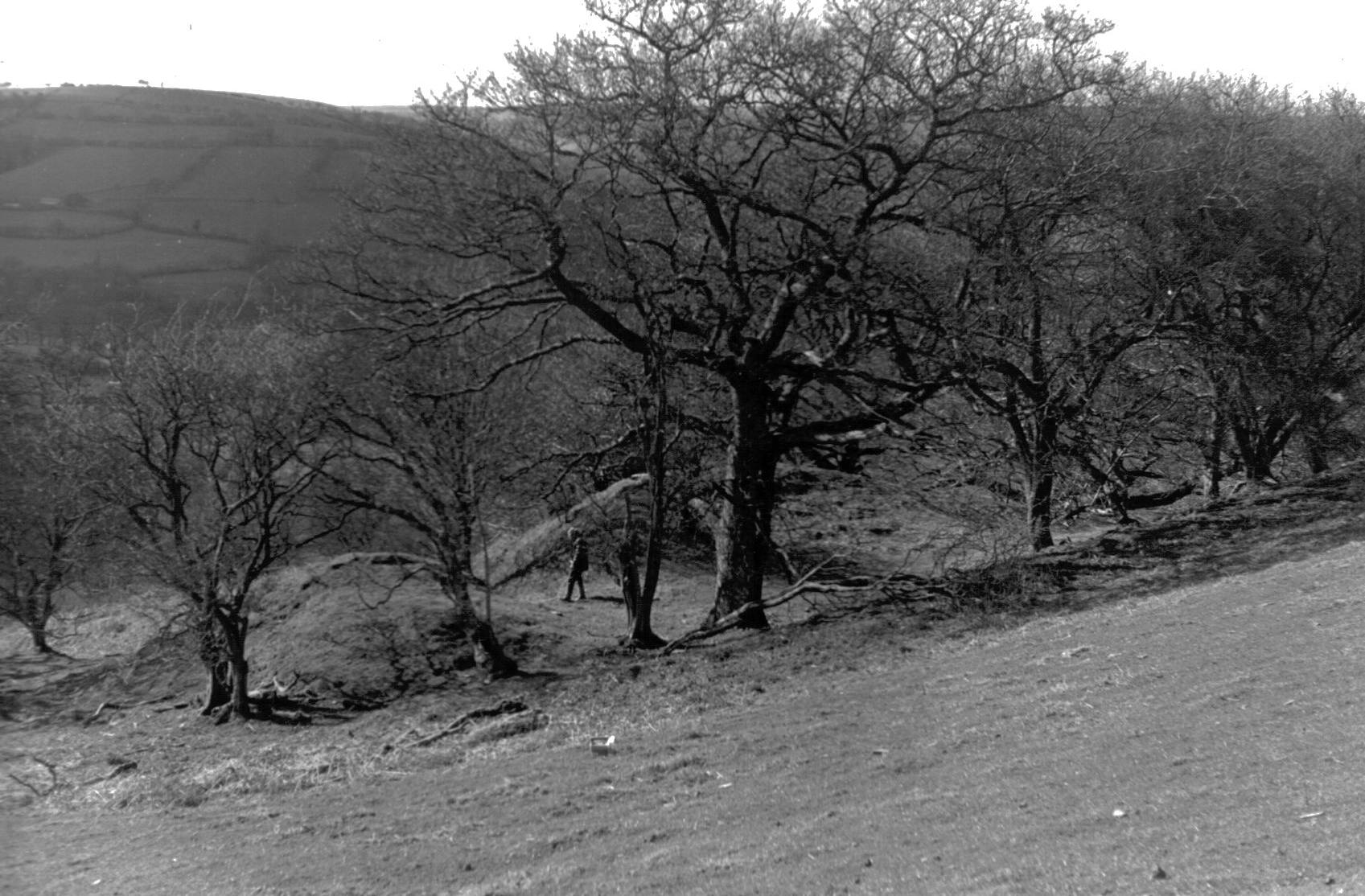
Tank C above main opencast

More leats and tanks can be found below the line of the main aqueduct, some of which are shown on the map of the site. They surround the lip of the very large opencast and the tank shown at right is one which was built on the main aqueduct. It was successful in finding a vein, judging by the opencast below, but must have been modified later to feed a washing table built to the left-hand side (near the figure in the picture), probably to wash the crushed ore from the same opencast working. It is labelled Tank C in the schematic diagram. Similar tanks occur below as the Romans followed the large vein down to the road and the main opencast. Most of the opencast workings must therefore be Roman in origin, since one of the aqueducts has been confirmed by carbon 14 dating as to predate all modern workings. Just by the road itself the Carreg Pumsaint has been erected in the space beside a large mound, now thought to be a dump of waste material from mining activities.

The existing ponds above and below the minor road from Pumsaint to Caeo, were probably part of a cascade for washing ore, the upper tank having yielded large quantities of Roman pottery from c. AD 78 to at least 300 (Lewis, 1977; Burnham 2004). The upper pool is known as Melin-y-Milwyr, or the soldiers' mill, an intriguing name that implies that watermills may have been used here during the Roman period. Alternatively, it may have been a sequence of washing tables for the crushed gold ore. A large-scale mill complex is known from Barbegal in southern France, where no less than 16 mills (in two lines of 8 each) were built into the side of a hill and supplied with water from a single aqueduct. There were two lines of parallel overshot mills, the outflow from one feeding the next below. The mill supplied flour to the region. Moreover, Roman engineers used sequences of reverse overshot water-wheels to dewater mines, and the deep workings at Dolaucothi produced a fragment of such a wheel during the 1930s when deep mining operations were resumed. Sequences of such wheels increased the lift, and one extensive sequence of 16 wheels was found in old Roman mine workings on the Rio Tinto river in the 1920s. The wheels were arranged in pairs and could lift water about 80 feet (24 m) from the bottom of the mine there.

=== Melin-y-Milwyr ===
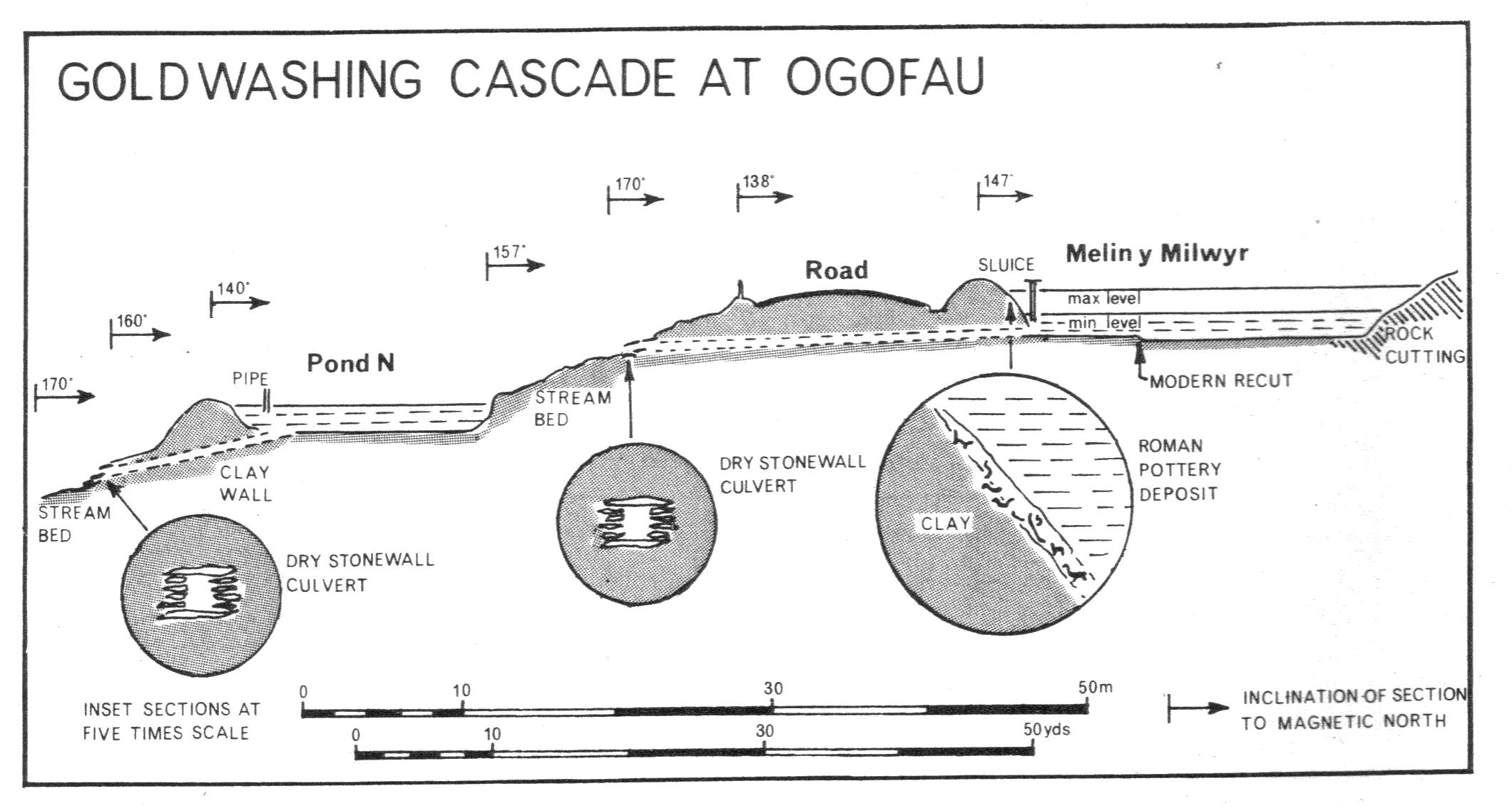
Section of Melin-y-Milwyr cascade

The tank at the head of the small road from Pumsaint to Caio was thought to be modern since it still holds water. However, when the level of the water was low in 1970, it yielded large quantities of Roman pottery which show that it is of Roman origin and built early during their exploitation of the mines. The section shows that it was connected to a smaller tank just below the modern road by a drystone culvert in a cascade. The lower tank also holds water but is in an advanced state of eutrophication. The collection of fragments included Samian ware and coarse ware from over 100 separate pots, and must have fallen into the reservoir when the mines were in full operation. Analysis of the pottery fragments showed a distribution of ages from the late 1st century AD through to the end of the 4th century. Since the fort and fortlet under the present village of Pumsaint ends in the middle of the 2nd century, it shows that mining continued for a long time after the military evacuation.

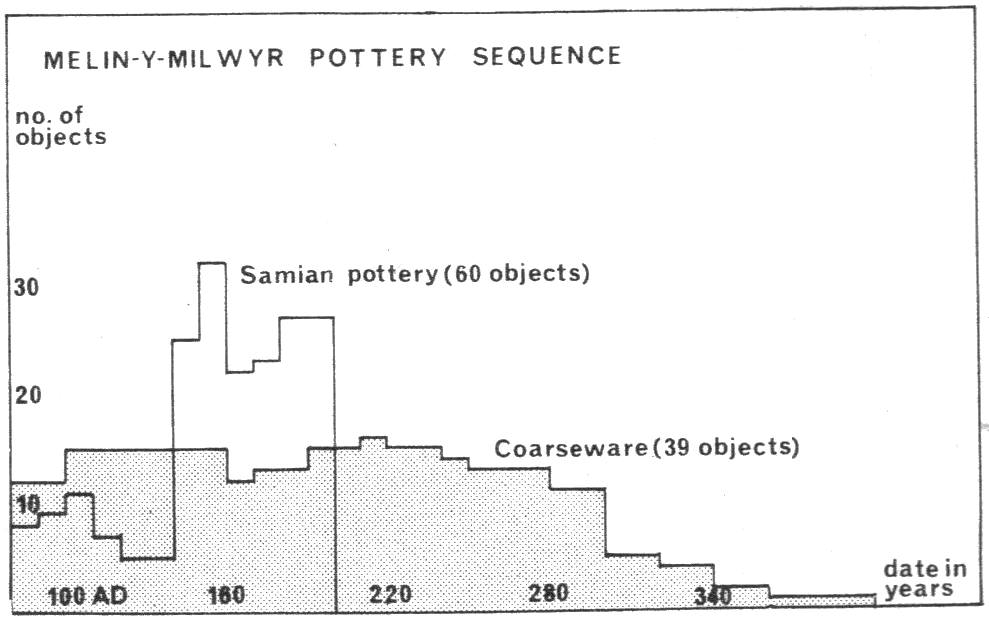
Pottery distribution in Melin-y-Milwyr

It implies that there is a large mining settlement in the vicinity of the village of Pumsaint which has yet to be found.

The exact function of the cascade is related to the methods of extracting the final traces of gold from the crushed ore. There were probably washing tables between the two tanks so that a gentle stream of water could be used to wash the ore on the rough surface of the tables, the finer gold being caught in the rougher parts of the tables, and removed at the end of the process. The cascade would probably have been built towards the end of the 1st century when underground mining commenced following opencast development.

=== Carreg Pumsaint ===
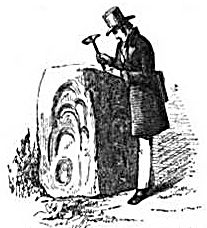
Carreg Pumsaint

This site yields some of the earliest evidence anywhere for the Roman use of water-powered trip hammers to crush ore (Burnham 1997). The ore was probably crushed on the famous Carreg Pumsaint, a block of stone erected many years ago before the Romans had left the site. There are parallels with similar stones at other ancient Roman mines in Europe, and the hollows in the block were formed by a trip hammer probably worked by a water wheel or a "water lever". Such a water-powered hammer would have been moved regularly as each hollow became too deep, so producing the series of overlapping oval hollows in its surfaces. The hammer head must have been of substantial size judging by the width of the hollows shown in the drawing. The stone is the only example so far discovered at the site, but is not unique, and Burnham refers to others of similar shape from Spain. As one side of the stone became worn, it was simply turned to reveal another side, so the block could be re-used several times. When found years after the Romans had left, in the Dark Ages, it gave rise to the legend of the five saints, who left the impression of their heads in the stone after being found asleep by the devil.

=== Deep mining ===
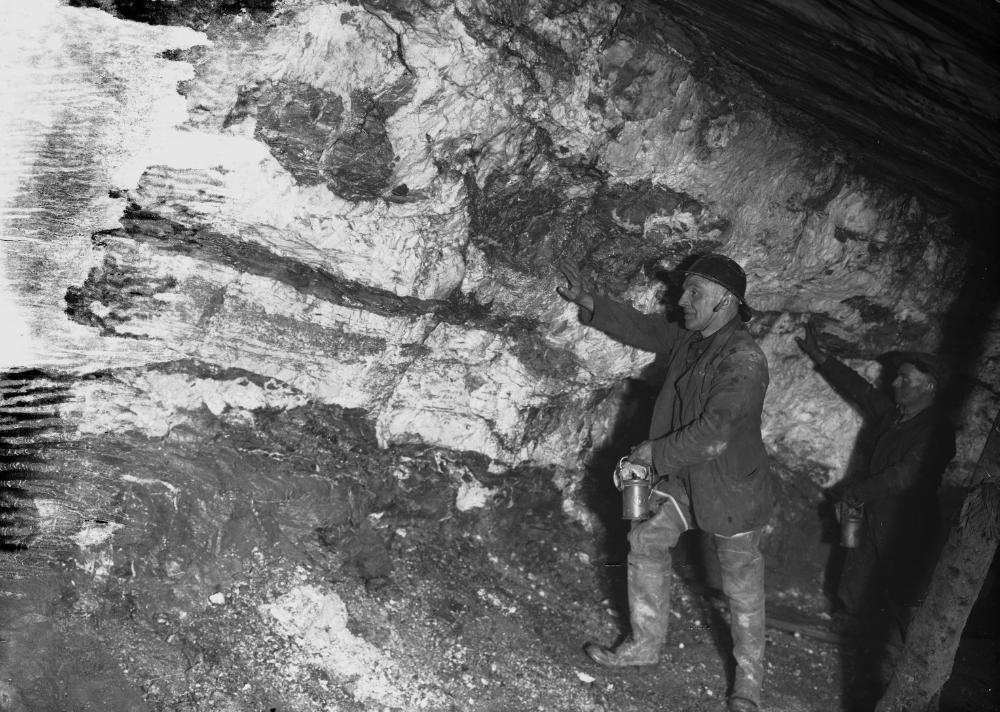
Miners working the gold mine c.1938

They followed the veins with shafts and tunnels, some of which still exist on the site. The remains of Roman dewatering machines were found during the 1880s and the 1920s when the Rio Tinto mines in Spain were being mined by opencast methods.

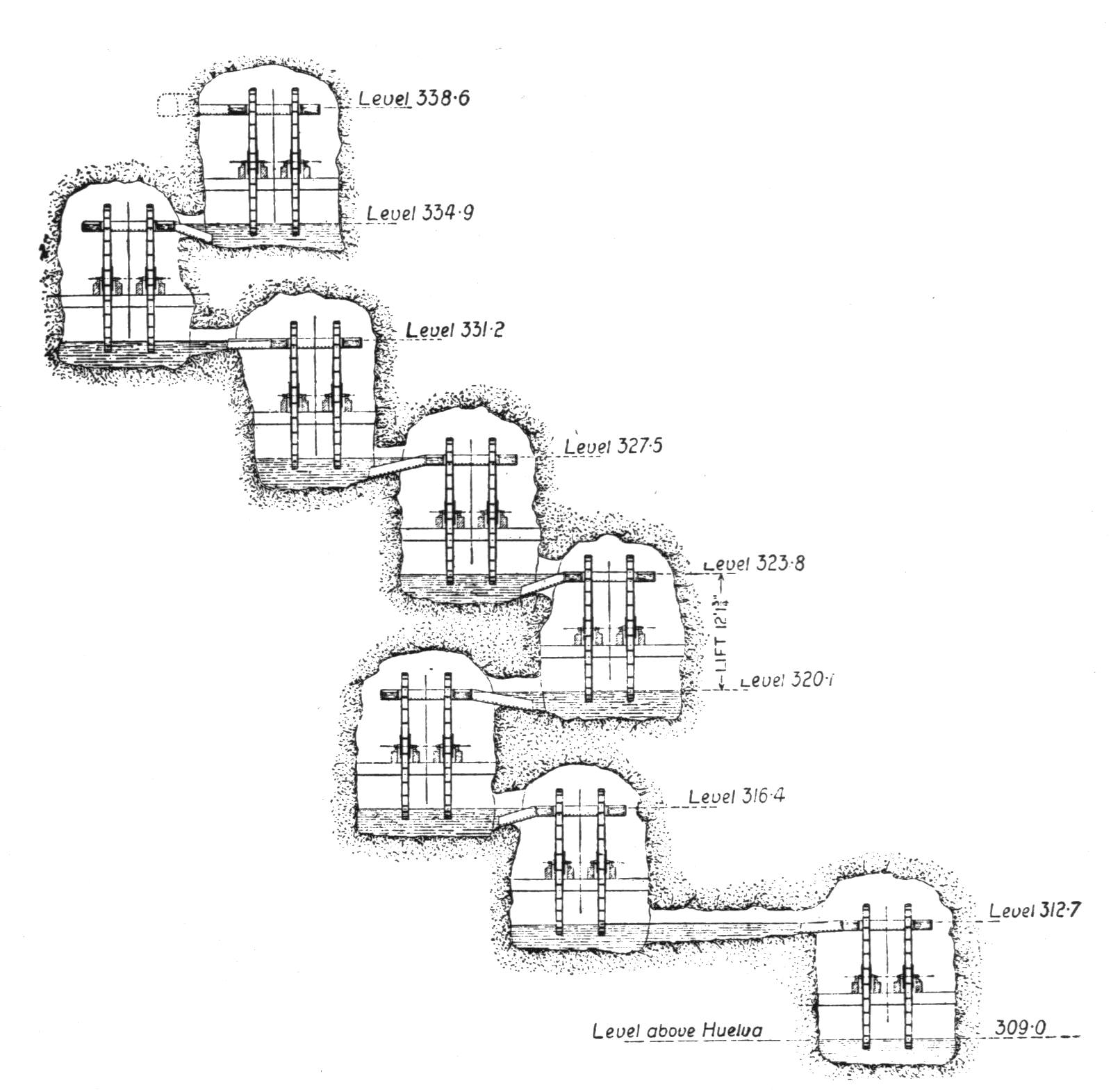
Sequence of wheels found at Rio Tinto

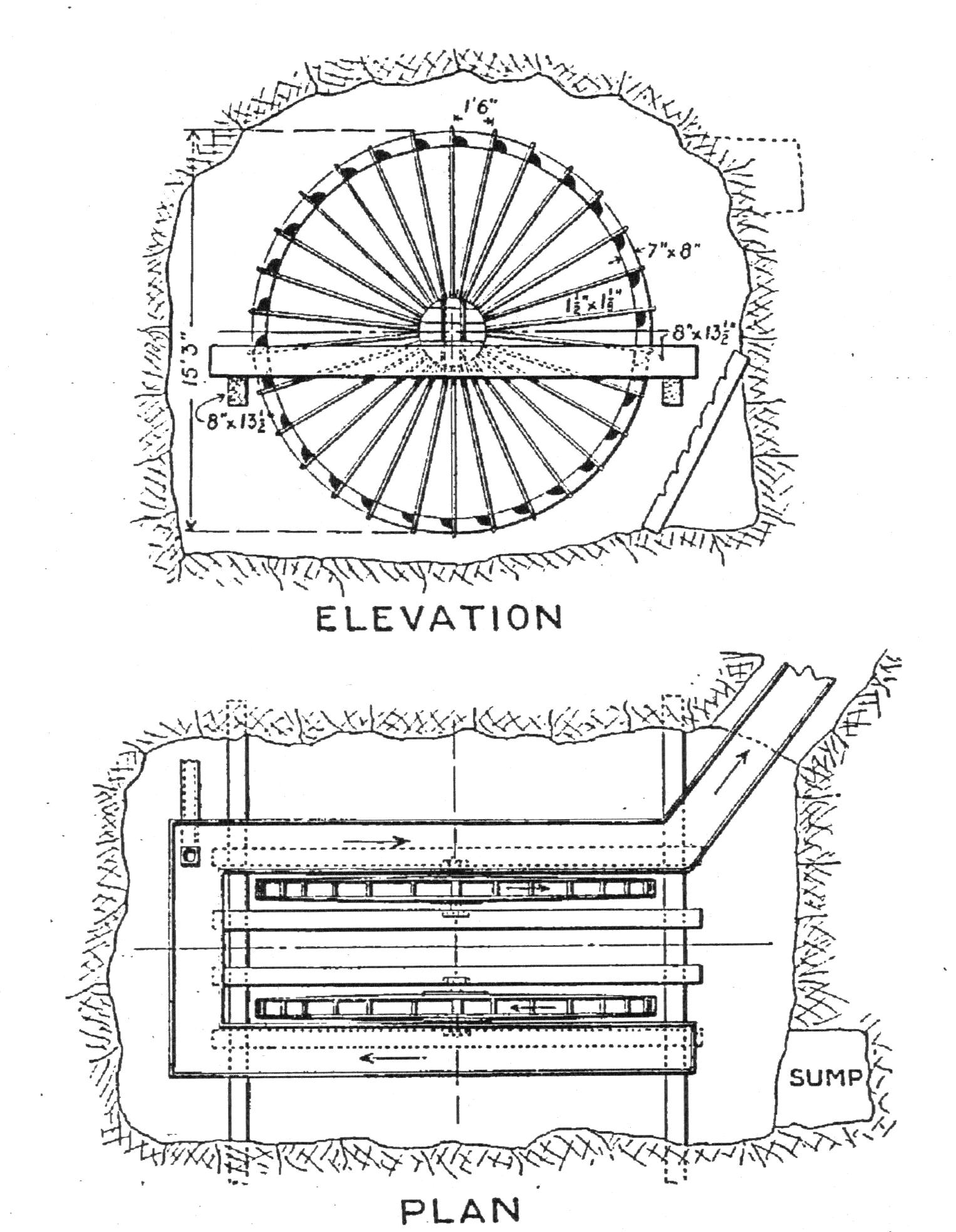
Drainage wheel from Rio Tinto mines

At Dolaucothi, a similar discovery was made in 1935 during mining operations, and it included part of a reverse overshot water wheel which is now in the National Museum of Wales. It was found with burnt timbers, suggesting that fire-setting was used to help break up the hard quartz in which the gold was trapped. A similar but larger wheel was rediscovered during mine operations at Rio Tinto in Spain, and is now in the British Museum, where it is displayed prominently in the Roman gallery. The Spanish example included a sequence of no fewer than 16 reverse overshot water wheels, each pair of wheels feeding water to the next set in the sequence. Each wheel would have been worked like a treadwheel, from the side rather than at the top. Since the fragment of a reverse overshot water wheel was found 160 feet below any known adit or stope, it must have been part of a similar sequence at Dolaucothi to that in Spain. Gold mining was sophisticated and technologically advanced at Dolaucothi, suggesting that the Roman army itself pioneered exploitation at the site. The construction of such dewatering machines is described by the Roman engineer Vitruvius writing in 25 BC, and their use for irrigation and lifting water in thermae was widespread.

At another part of the mine, on Penlan-wen, water would have been in short supply; a siphon could have transferred water from the main aqueduct or one of its tanks, but remains unproven. The vein carries along the hill for some considerable distance, and has been trenched out. This method involved excavating the vein vertically down while keeping the top open. However, ventilation becomes a problem when fire-setting is used, so three long adits were driven in from the hillside to the north. They are much wider than normal galleries, suggesting that their primary purpose was to allow circulation of air through the trench and permit safe fire-setting. The upper two adits are still open to the trench, but the lowest one is currently blocked.

== Similar sites ==
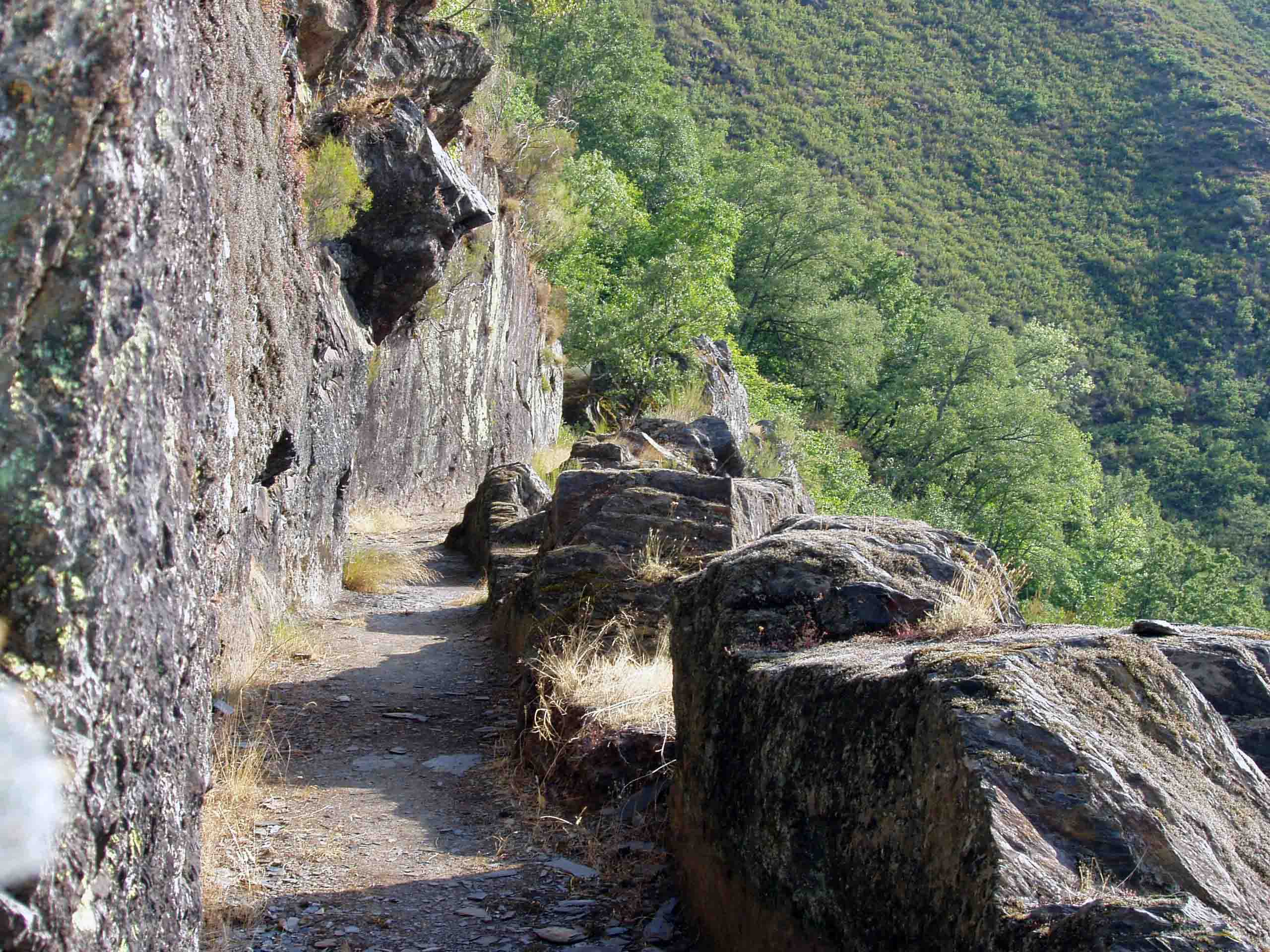
Rock-cut aqueduct feeding water to Las Médulas

Although there is nothing directly comparable with Dolaucothi in Britain in terms of the extensive hydraulic systems, there are many other known Roman mines in Britain, some of which seem to show traces of hydraulic activity. They include the extensive remains of lead mining at Charterhouse in the Mendips, Halkyn in Flintshire, and many areas in the Pennines. Dolaucothi is most directly comparable with gold mines in the Carpathian Mountains of Transylvania in modern Romania, at Rosia Montana, and with the Roman gold mines in north-west Spain, such as the very much larger site of alluvial mining at Las Médulas and Montefurado. The use of slave labour would have been limited to menial, repetitive or brute force tasks, as archeological remains show that only higly skilled miners and builders could perform the work required for successful commercial mine operations, as noted by Pliny. Free contractors with high engineering skills in surveying and building aqueducts, reservoirs and water tanks or cisterns were in charge of the infrastructure design and maintenance. These details are known through the bronze table Lex Metalli Vipacensis, found in southern Portugal.

There is some evidence that some of the gold was worked at the site, judging by the finished brooch shown above, as well as other finished gold products. A part engraved jewel has also been found in the vicinity. Such activities would have needed skilled, not slave labour. No workshops or furnaces have yet been found, but it is likely that both existed on site. Ingots of gold would have been easier to transport than dust or nuggets, although a high-temperature refractory furnace will have been needed to melt the gold, which has a melting point of 1,064 °C (1,947 °F). Pliny mentions such special furnaces in his Naturalis historia. A workshop will have been vital for building and maintaining mining equipment such as the drainage wheels, flumes for washing tables, shuttering for aqueducts, crushing equipment and pit-props. Official mints would have produced gold coins, a key component of Roman currency. After the military occupation the mine may have been taken over by Romano-British civilian contractors some time after 125, although the final history of the site has yet to be determined.

== Later history ==
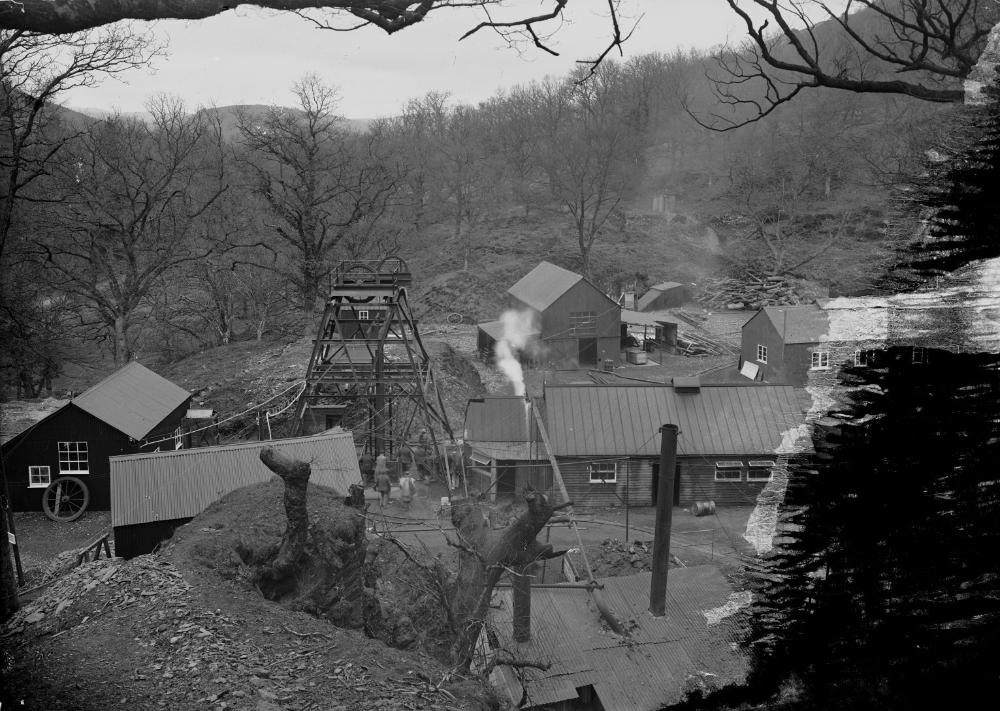
Mining operations at Dolaucothi shortly before its closure in 1938

Following the Roman departure from Britain in the 5th century, the mine lay abandoned for centuries. There was a revival in the 19th century and attempts to make successful ventures at the site in the early 20th century, but they were abandoned before the First World War. In the 1930s a shaft was sunk to 430 feet (130 m) in an attempt to locate new seams. Falling into disrepair and unsafe due to flooding at its lower levels, the mine finally closed in 1938. It was during this period that ancient underground workings were found, and the fragment of the dewatering mill discovered within. The extensive surface remains, especially the traces of hydraulic mining, were to be discovered only in the 1970s by intensive fieldwork and surveying.

Between 1975 and 2000 the lease to the underground workings at Dolaucothi was held by Cardiff University. Students from the School of Engineering were largely responsible for the renovation of the underground workings that were made safe for tourists. The mine was extensively used as a training mine for Mining Engineering and Exploration Geology students under the supervision of Alun Isaac, Alwyn Annels and Peter Brabham. Students from the School of Earth Sciences carried out an active gold exploration programme using surface and underground diamond drilling techniques, geochemical soil sampling and geophysics. Geological exploration was carried out by students using both surface and underground drilling methods. The ore processing waste tailings dam was also sampled, mapped geophysically and assessed for its Gold potential. The mine was extensively mapped and a library of Dolaucothi data is still held at the School of Earth & Ocean Sciences at Cardiff University. Cardiff University finally gave up the lease to the underground workings in 2000 due to the closure of its BSc Mining Engineering degree course. Photographs of surface and underground activities from the Cardiff University archives can be found from the links below.

Although there is yet no comparable site in Britain, it is likely that field work will locate other mines, simply by tracing the remains of aqueducts and reservoirs, and often, if not usually, aided by aerial photography. Physical remains like tanks and aqueducts are often recognised by the shadows cast by the structures in oblique lighting conditions. Thus Tank A was first seen in early morning light when the sun's rays cast an oblique light across the hill (Allt Cwmhenog) on which the structure is situated.

=== Other local mines ===
The lead mines of Nantymwyn near Rhandirmwyn village some 8 miles (13 km) to the north may also have been first worked by the Romans, judging by hushing tanks and aqueducts found there in the 1970s both from fieldwork and aerial photographs. They occur at the top of the mountain called Pencerrig-mwyn, and the veins were followed underground by several tunnels leading to the workings. Inside, the veins have been removed and debris carefully stacked within the stope. The workings lie far above the later modern mines and processing plant (now derelict). The later mine was once the largest lead mine in Wales.

=== Other local sites ===
There are Roman forts at Llandovery and Bremia near Llanio, and as of 2003, in Llandeilo.

== National Trust ==
The National Trust has owned and run the Dolaucothi gold mine and Dolaucothi Estate since 1941 when it was bequeathed by descendants of the Johnes family who had owned the mine and large surrounding estate since the late 16th century. The University of Manchester and University of Cardiff were active in exploring the extensive remains in the 1960s and 1970s and Lampeter University is now closely involved with the archaeology of the site. The National Trust organises guided tours for visitors, showing them the mine and the Roman archaeology.

== See also ==
- Aerial archaeology
- De architectura
- De re metallica
- Dolaucothi Estate
- Fire-setting
- Georg Agricola
- Gold mining
- Gold extraction
- Gold prospecting
- Hushing
- Mining archaeology in British Isles
- Mining in Roman Britain
- River Cothi
- Roman aqueducts
- Roman engineering
- Roman mining
- Roman technology
- Welsh gold
