= Reverse overshot water wheel =

Mechanical power-generating device

Frequently used in mines and probably elsewhere (such as agricultural drainage), the reverse overshot water wheel was a Roman innovation to help remove water from the lowest levels of underground workings. It is described by Vitruvius in his work De architectura published circa 25 BC. The remains of such systems found in Roman mines by later mining operations show that they were used in sequences so as to lift water a considerable height.

== Vitruvius ==
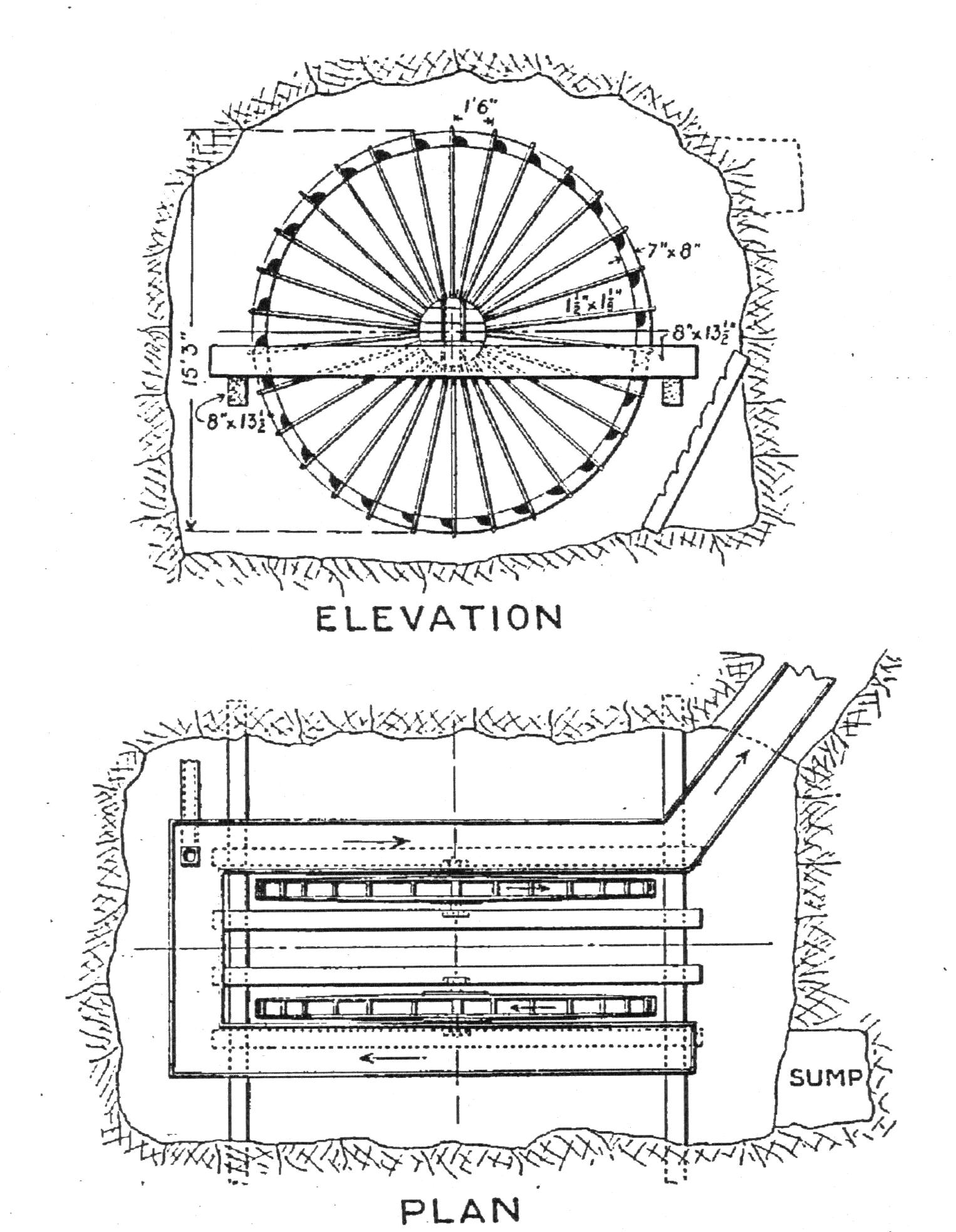
Drainage wheel from Rio Tinto mines

The Roman author Vitruvius gives explicit instructions on the construction of dewatering devices, and describes three variants of the "tympanum" in Chapter X of De architectura. It is a large wheel fitted with boxes, which in the first design, encompass the whole diameter of the wheel. Holes are bored in the boxes to allow water into them, so that as a box dips into the water, it enters and is raised as the wheel turns. When it reaches to the top of the turn, the water runs out into a channel. He then describes a second variant where the boxes are only fitted to the ends of the wheel, so that although the volume of water carried is much smaller, it is carried to a greater height. The final variant is an endless chains of buckets, and much greater lifts can be achieved, although greater effort is needed.

== Pliny the Elder ==
Pliny the Elder is probably referring to such devices in a discussion of silver/lead mines in his Naturalis Historia. Spain produced the most silver in his time, many of the silver mines having been started by Hannibal. One of the largest had galleries running for between one and two miles into the mountain, "water-men" (in Latin "aquatini") draining the mine, and they

stood night and day in shifts measured by lamps, bailing out water and making a stream.

That they stood suggests that they operated the wheels by standing on the top to turn the cleats, and continuous working would produce a steady stream of water.

== Examples ==
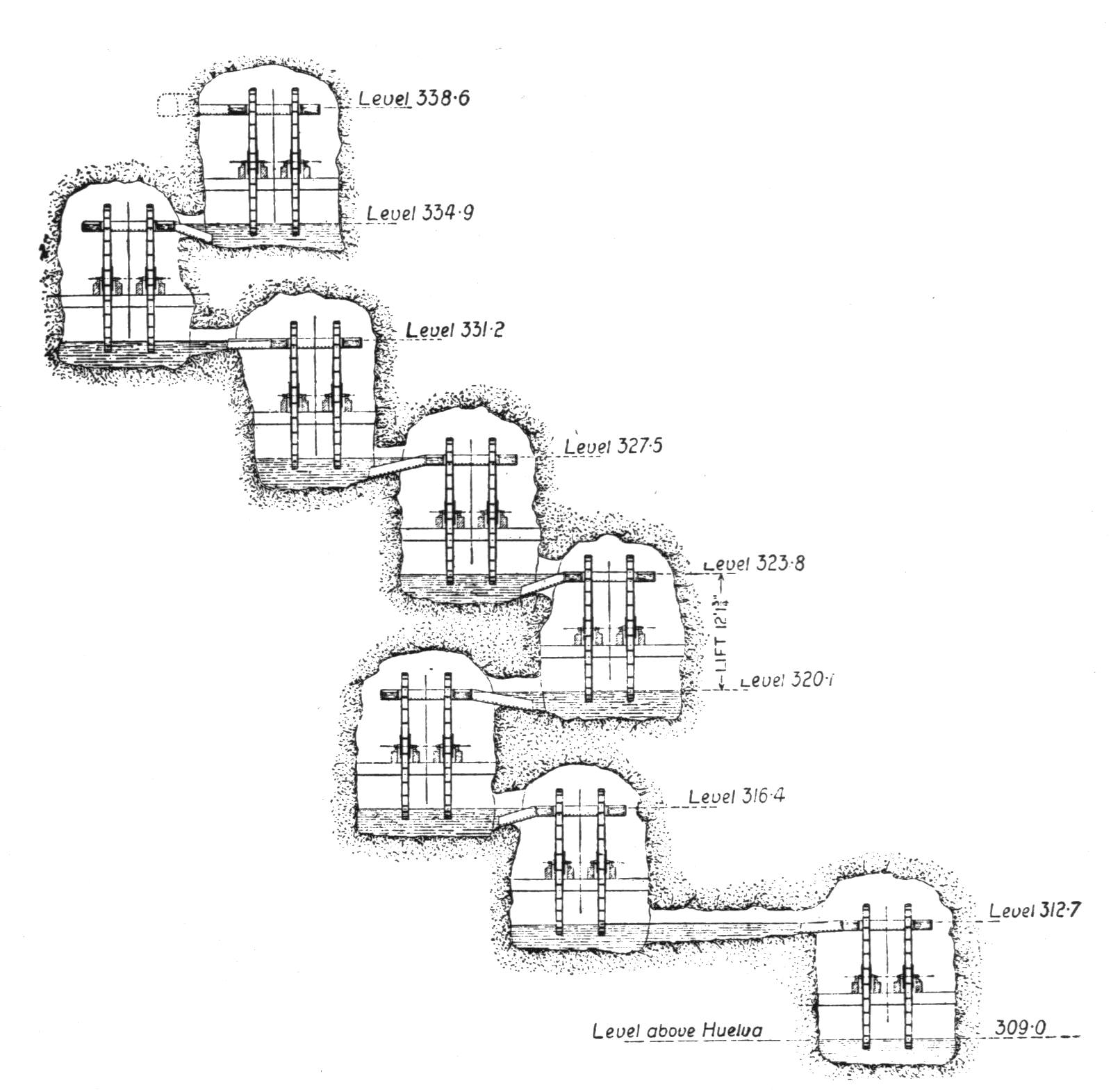
Sequence of wheels found in Rio Tinto mines

Fragments of such machines have been found in mines which were re-opened in the Victorian era in Spain, especially at Rio Tinto, where one example used no less than 16 such wheels working in pairs, each pair of wheels lifting water about 3.5 metres (11 ft), so giving a total lift of 30 metres (98 ft). The system was carefully engineered, and was worked by individuals treading slats at the side of each wheel. It is not an isolated example, because Oliver Davies mentions examples from the Tharsis copper mine and Logroño in Spain, as well as from Dacia. The gold deposits in Dacia, now modern Romania were especially rich, and worked intensively after the successful Roman invasion under Trajan. According to Oliver Davies, one such sequence discovered at Ruda in Hunedoara County in modern Romania was 75 metres (246 ft) deep. If worked like the Rio Tinto example, it would have needed at least 32 wheels.

One such wheel from Spain was rescued and part of it is now on display in the British Museum. Some of the components are numbered, suggesting that it was prefabricated above ground before assembly in the underground passages. In the 1930s, a fragment of a wooden bucket from a drainage wheel was found in deep workings at the Dolaucothi gold mine in west Wales, and is now preserved in the National Museum of Wales in Cardiff. It has been carbon dated to about 90 AD. From the depth of 50 metres (160 ft) below known open workings, it can be inferred that the drainage wheel was part of a sequence just like that found in Spain. The shape of the edge of one of the lifting buckets is almost identical with that from Spain, suggesting that a template was used to make the devices.

== The Cochlea ==
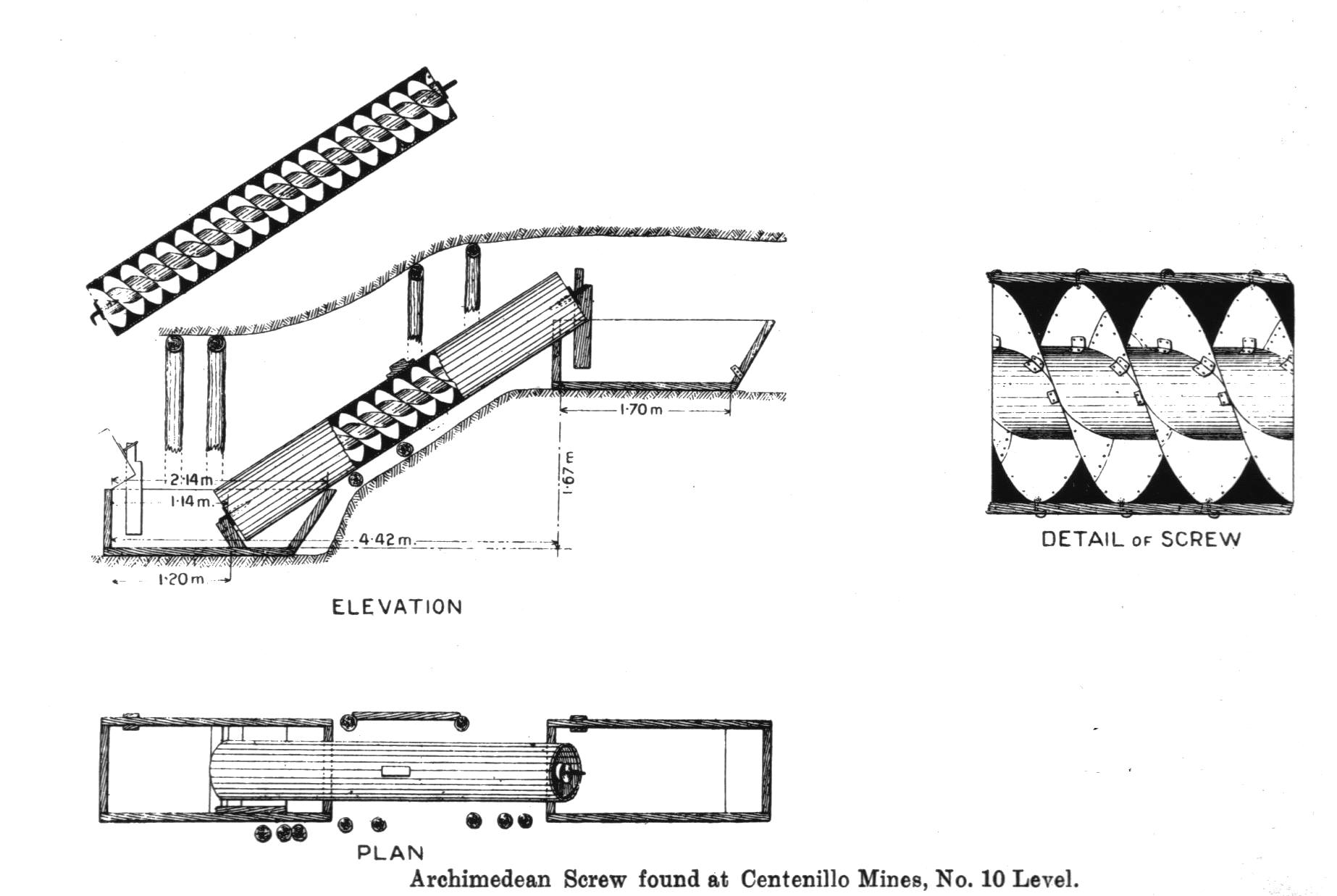
Roman screw used to dewater mines in Spain

Another device which was used widely was the Archimedean screw, and examples of such drainage machines have also been found in many old mines. Depictions show the screws being powered by a human treading on the outer casing to turn the entire apparatus as one piece. They were also used in series, so increasing the lift of water from the workings. However, they must have been more difficult to operate since the user had to stand on a slanting surface to turn the screw. The steeper the incline, the greater the risk of the user slipping from the top of the screw. No doubt the reverse water wheel was easier to use with a horizontal treading surface. On the other hand, the screw could be operated by a crank handle fitted to the central axle, but would be more tiring since the weight of the operator does not bear on the crank, as it does when trod from above.

Like the reverse water wheel, the cochlea was used for many other purposes apart from draining mines. Irrigation of farmland would have been the most popular application, but any activity which involved lifting water would have employed the devices.

== Water wheels ==
Multiple sequences of water wheels were used elsewhere in the Roman Empire, such as the famous example at Barbegal in southern France. This system was also a stack of 16 wheels but worked like a normal overshot wheel, the wheels driving stone mills and used to grind grain. The water mills were worked from a masonry aqueduct supplying the Roman town at Arles, and the remains of the masonry mills are still visible on the ground today, unlike the underground drainage systems of the mines, which were destroyed by later mining operations. Other such sequences of mills existed on the Janiculum in Rome, but have been covered and changed by later buildings built on top of them.

== See also ==
- Mining in ancient Rome
- Frontinus
- List of ancient watermills
- Roman engineering
- Roman technology
