= Hushing =

Ancient mining method

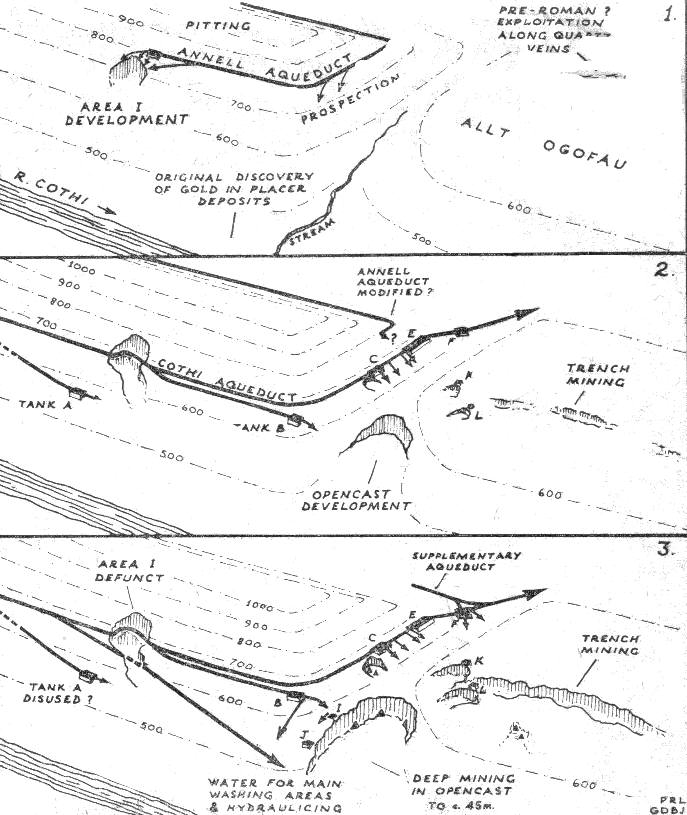
Sketch map of the development of the Dolaucothi Gold Mines in Carmarthenshire, south Wales, showing hushing fed by aqueducts.

Hushing is an ancient and historic mining method using a flood or torrent of water to reveal mineral veins. The method was applied in several ways, both in prospecting for ores, and for their exploitation. Mineral veins are often hidden below soil and sub-soil, which must be stripped away to discover the ore veins. A flood of water is very effective in moving soil as well as working the ore deposits when combined with other methods such as fire-setting.

Hushing was used during the formation and expansion of the Roman Empire from the 1st century BC on to the end of the empire. It was also widely used later, and apparently survived until modern times where the cost of explosives was prohibitive. It was widely used in the United States, where it was known as "booming".

A variant known as hydraulic mining where jets or streams of water are used to break down deposits, especially of alluvial gold and alluvial tin, is commonly used.

== History ==
The method is well described by Pliny the Elder in Book XXXIII of his Naturalis Historia from the 1st century AD. He distinguishes the use of the method for prospecting for ore and use during mining itself. It was used during the Roman period for hydraulic mining of alluvial gold deposits, and in opencast vein mining, for removal of rock debris, created by mechanical attack and fire-setting. He describes how tanks and reservoirs are built near the suspected veins, filled with water from an aqueduct, and the water suddenly released from a sluice-gate onto the hillside below, scouring the soil away to reveal the bedrock and any veins occurring there.

== Method ==
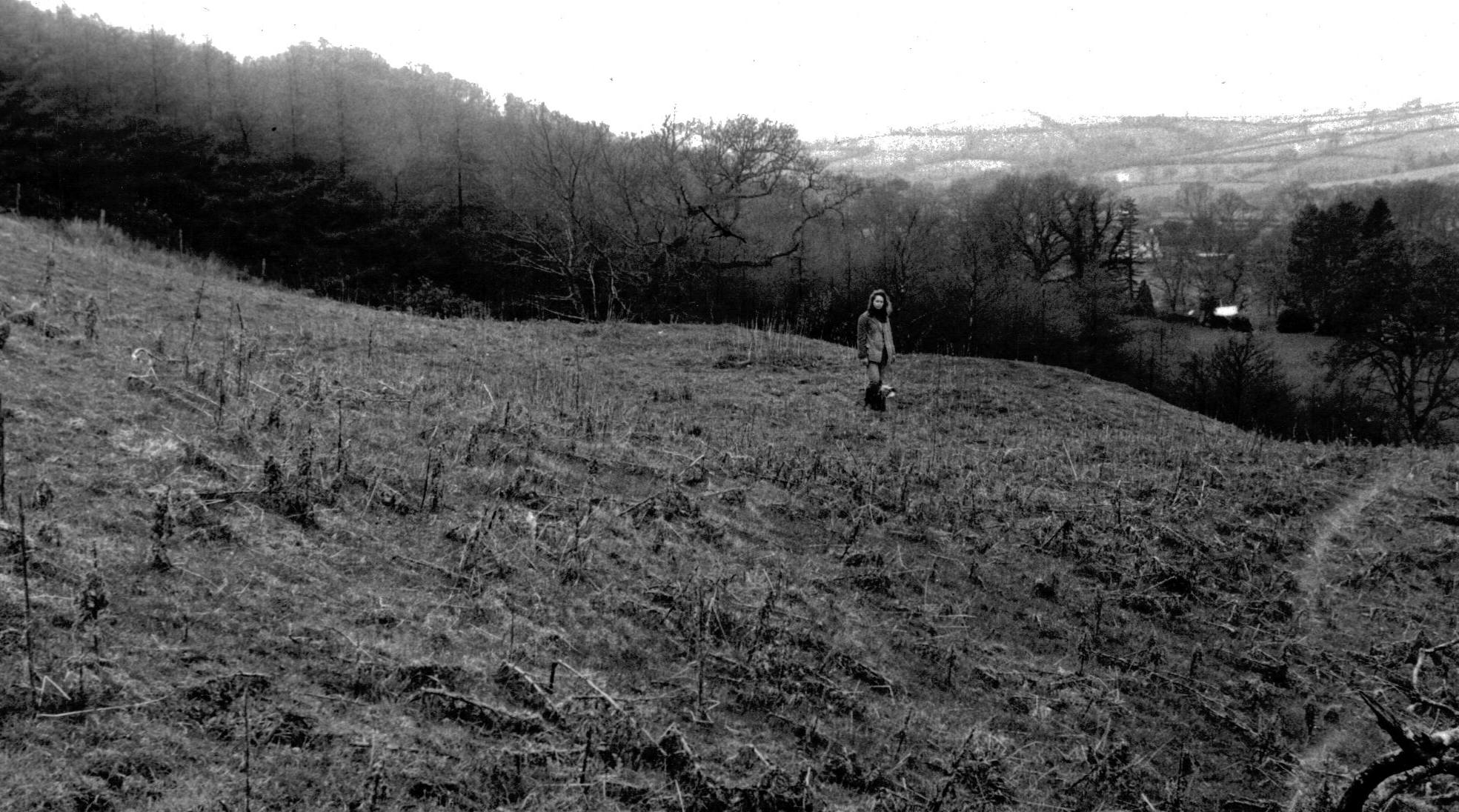
Small tank A near north opencast at the Roman Dolaucothi Gold Mines in Carmarthenshire, Wales: the person is standing within the reservoir bank, which has eroded over the years

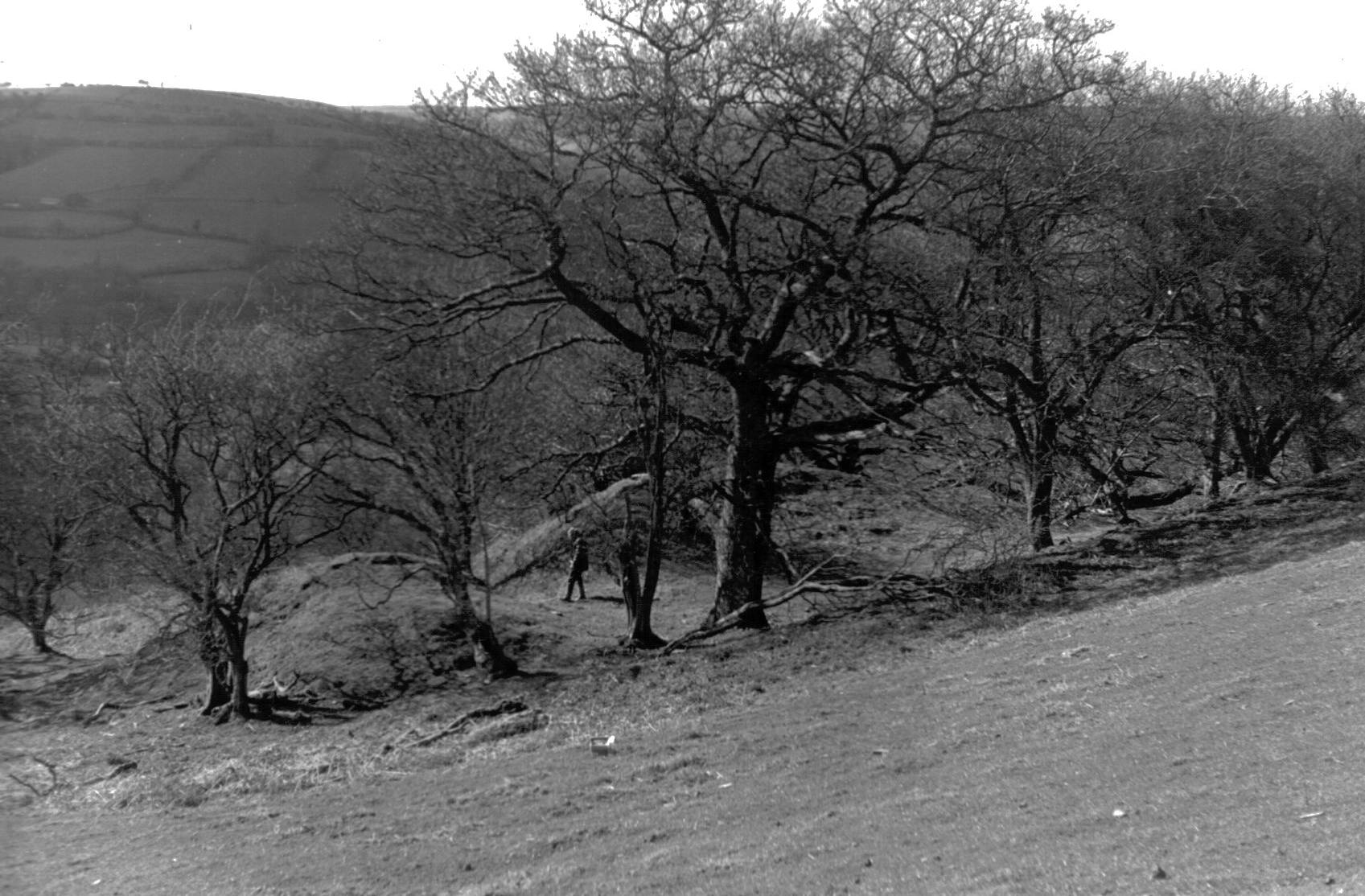
Tank C above main opencast at Dolaucothi

The power behind a large release of water is very great, especially if it forms a single water wave, and is well known as a strong force in coastal erosion and river erosion. Such a wave could be created by a sluice gate covering one end of the reservoir, possibly a permanent fixture such as a swinging flap or a rising gate. The size of the tank controlled the height of the wave and its volume. Hushing was most effective when used on steep ground such as the brow of a hill or mountain, the force of falling water lessening as the slope becomes smaller. The rate of attack would be controlled by the water supply, and perhaps more difficult the higher the deposit to be cleared.

If veins of ore were found using the method, then hushing could also remove the rock debris created when attacking the veins. Pliny also describes the way hillsides could be undermined, and then collapsed to release the ore-bearing material. The Romans developed the method into a sophisticated way of extracting large alluvial gold deposits such as those at Las Médulas in northern Spain, and for hard rock gold veins such as those at Dolaucothi in Wales. The development of the mine at Dolaucothi shows the versatility of the method in finding and then exploiting ore deposits.

There are the remains of numerous tanks and reservoirs still to be seen at the site, one example being shown at right. It was a small tank built for prospecting on the north side of the isolated opencast north of the main mine. It was presumably built to prospect the ground to one side of the opencast for traces of the gold-bearing veins extending to the north. It failed to find the veins here, so was abandoned. It probably precedes the construction of the 7 mile long aqueduct supplying the main site, and was fed by a small leat from a tributary of the river Cothi about a mile further north up the valley. The method could be applied to any ore type, and succeeded best in hilly terrain. The Romans were well experienced in building the long aqueducts needed to supply the large volumes of water needed by the method, and construction was probably directed by army engineers.

== Earlier evidence ==
The earlier history of the method is obscure, although there is an intriguing reference by Strabo writing ca 25 BC in his Geographica, Book IV, Chapter 6, to gold extraction in the Val d'Aosta in the Alps. He describes the problem gold miners had with a local tribe because of the great volumes of water they had taken from the local river, reducing it to a trickle and so affecting the local farmers. Whether or not they used the water for hushing remains unknown, but it seems possible because the method requires large volumes of water to be operated. Later, when the Romans assumed control of the mining operations, the locals charged them for using the water. The tribe occupied the higher mountains and controlled the water sources, and had not yet been subdued by the Romans:

The country of the Salassi has gold mines also, which in former times, when the Salassi were powerful, they kept possession of, just as they were also masters of the passes. The Durias River was of the greatest aid to them in their mining — I mean in washing the gold; and therefore, in making the water branch off to numerous places, they used to empty the common bed completely. But although this was helpful to the Salassi in their hunt for the gold, it distressed the people who farmed the plains below them, because their country was deprived of irrigation; for, since its bed was on favourable ground higher up, the river could give the country water. And for this reason both tribes were continually at war with each other. But after the Romans got the mastery, the Salassi were thrown out of their gold-works and country too; however, since they still held possession of the mountains, they sold water to the publicans who had contracted to work the gold mines; but on account of the greediness of the publicans. Salassi were always in disagreement with them too.

The historian Polybius, who lived from 220 to 170 BC, was writing much earlier in The Histories (Book 34), and he records that gold mining in the Alpine region was so successful that the price of gold in Italy fell by a third during this period. From his description of large nuggets, and the find being made only two feet below the ground level, with deposits reaching down to 15 feet, it is likely to have been an alluvial deposit where water methods such as hushing would have been very effective. Modern attempts to identify the mines point to one especially large ancient gold mine at Bessa in Northern Italy. It appears to have been worked intensively in pre-Roman days and continued to expand with Roman involvement. The scale of the aqueducts there seems to support Strabo's comments.

== Later examples ==
The technique appears to have been neglected through the medieval period, because Georgius Agricola, writing in the 16th century in his De re metallica, does not mention hushing at all, although he does describe many other uses of water power, especially for washing ore and driving watermills. However, the technique was used on a large scale in the lead mines of northern Britain from at least Elizabethan times onwards. The method was described in some detail by Westgarth Forster in his book A Treatise on a Section of the Strata from Newcastle upon Tyne to the Mountain of Cross Fell in Cumberland (1809), and also in the 1842 Royal Commission on Children in Mines in relation to children being used in the lead mines of the Pennines.

The remnants of hush gullies are visible at many places in the Pennines and at other locations such as the extensive lead mines at Cwmystwyth in Ceredigion, Wales, and at the Stiperstones in Shropshire. Another notable example is the Great Dun Fell hush gully near Cross Fell, Cumbria, probably formed in the Georgian era in the search for lead and silver. This gully is about 100 feet deep, carries a small stream, and is a prominent landmark on the bleak moors. The dams used to store the water are also often visible at the head of the stream.

Although the term "hushing" was not used in south-west England, there is a reference to the technique being used at Tregardock in North Cornwall, where in around 1580 mine adventurers used the method to work a lead-silver deposit, although lives were lost in the attempt. Phil Newman, writing in 2011, states that there is possible archaeological evidence for use of the technique at two sites on Dartmoor in Devon, in the form of channels running downhill that apparently originate from contour-following leats, though he says research is needed for confirmation.

In south-eastern Lancashire hushing was used to extract limestone from the glacial boulder clay so that it could be used to make lime for agriculture, mortar, plaster and limewash. Bennett notes leases of land for this purpose in the 17th and 18th centuries and remains can still be seen at sites like Shedden Clough. Hushing for limestone seems to have been limited to the eastern side of the Pennine ridge, between Burnley and the Cliviger Gorge, and probably occurred here because of the cost of obtaining supplies from further away, as well as the suitability of the boulder clay and the availability of water supplies.

The technique was also used during alluvial gold mining in Africa, at least until the 1930s, when it was described by Griffith in his book Alluvial Mining (2nd Ed., 1960). The water outlet could be controlled by an automatic system which allowed water to flow through the sluice gate when the overflow triggered a release mechanism.

== See also ==
- Dartmoor tin-mining
- Derbyshire lead mining history
- Dolaucothi Gold Mines
- Mining in Cornwall
- Placer mining
- Roman engineering
- Roman technology
- Roman mining
