= Roman metallurgy =

Metal production and use in ancient Rome

Roman Chronology
Context for Metallurgy (Shepard 1993)
circa 753 BC	First settlement in the Iron Age; see also founding of Rome.
600–524 BC	Etruscans control Italy.
550–500 BC	Carthaginian occupation of parts of Sardinia and Sicily.
509 BC	Creation of the Roman Republic.
510–27 BC	Roman Republic and beginning of Rome's expansion.
390 BC	Etruria becomes part of Rome.
264–146 BC	Punic Wars.
197 BC	Iberia becomes a Roman province.
197 BC	Athens becomes a Roman province.
146 BC	Carthage becomes a Roman province.
129 BC	Asia Minor becomes a Roman province.
58–52 BC	Roman conquest of Gaul.
30 BC	Egypt becomes a Roman province.
27 BC	The institution of the Roman Principate begins with Augustus, the first Roman Emperor.
44 AD	Britannia becomes a Roman province.
106 AD	Dacia becomes a Roman province.

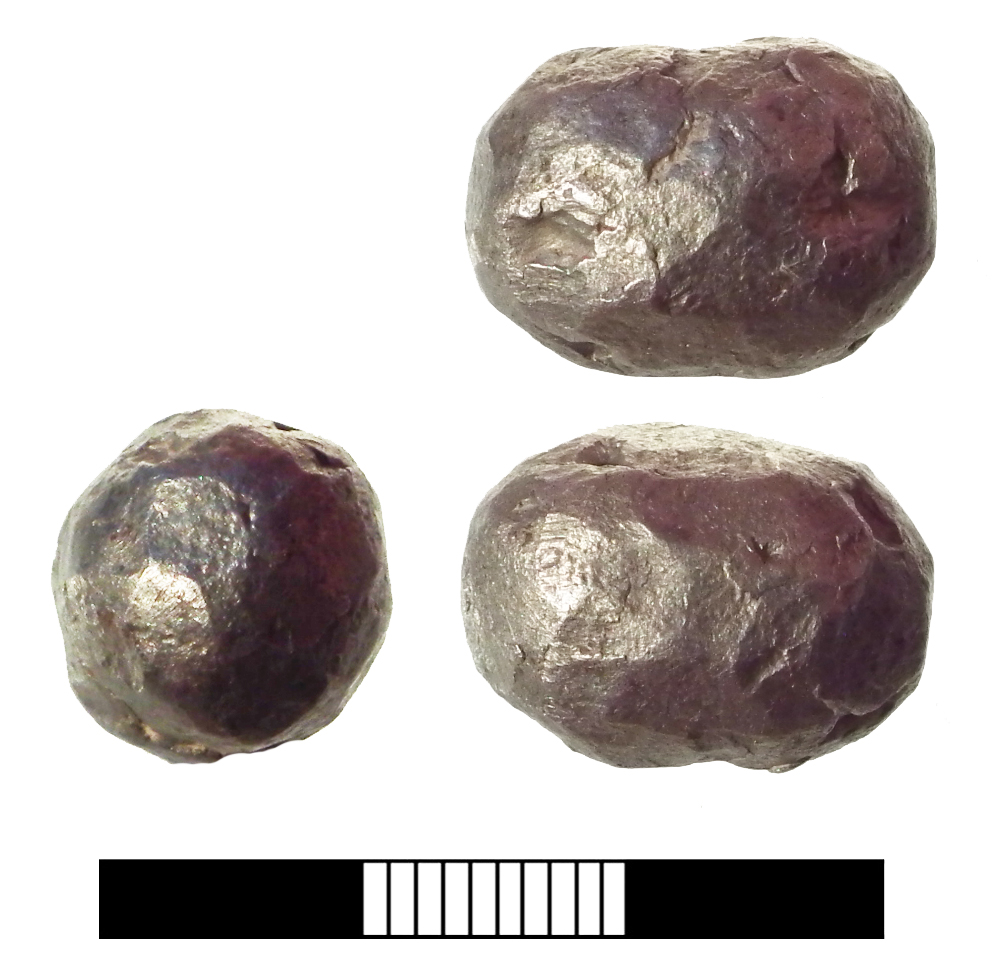
Roman silver ingot, Britain, 1st–4th centuries AD

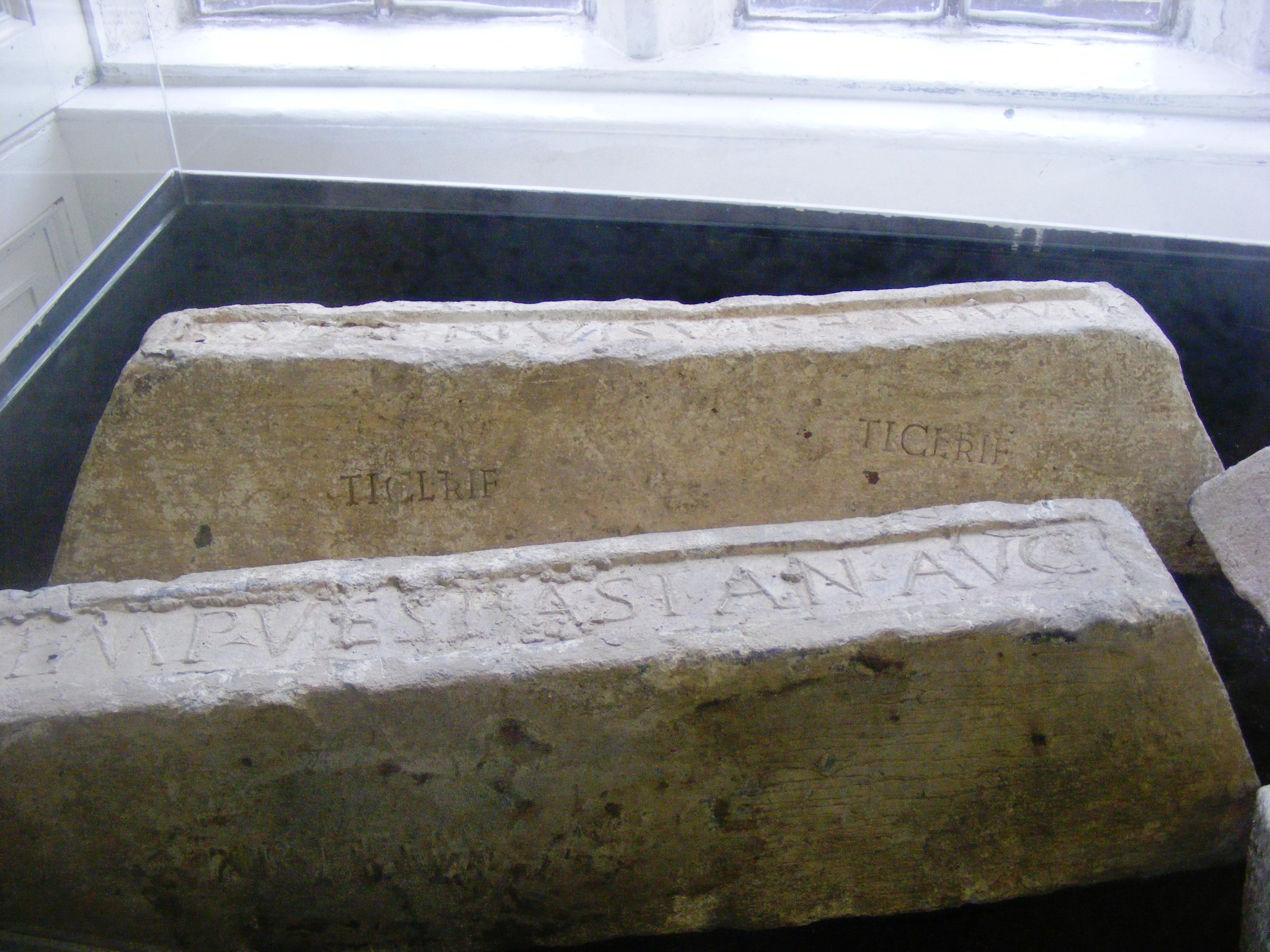
Lead ingots from Roman Britain

Metals and metal working had been known to the people of modern Italy since the Bronze Age. By 53 BC, Rome had expanded to control an immense expanse of the Mediterranean. This included Italy and its islands, Spain, Macedonia, Africa, Asia Minor, Syria and Greece; by the end of the Emperor Trajan's reign, the Roman Empire had grown further to encompass parts of Britain, Egypt, all of modern Germany west of the Rhine, Dacia, Noricum, Judea, Armenia, Illyria, and Thrace (Shepard 1993). As the empire grew, so did its need for metals.

Central Italy itself was not rich in metal ores, leading to necessary trade networks in order to meet the demand for metal. Early Italians had some access to metals in the northern regions of the peninsula in Tuscany and Cisalpine Gaul, as well as the islands Elba and Sardinia. With the conquest of Etruria in 275 BC and the subsequent acquisitions due to the Punic Wars, Rome had the ability to stretch further into Transalpine Gaul and Iberia, both areas rich in minerals. At the height of the Empire, Rome exploited mineral resources from Tingitana in north western Africa to Egypt, Arabia, Armenia, Galatia to Germania, and Britannia to Iberia, encompassing all of the Mediterranean coast. Britannia, Iberia, Dacia, and Noricum were of special significance, as they were very rich in deposits and became major sites of resource exploitation (Shepard, 1993).

There is evidence that after the middle years of the Empire there was a sudden and steep decline in mineral extraction. This was mirrored in other trades and industries.

One of the most important Roman sources of information is Pliny the Elder's Natural History. Books 33-37 cover metals and other minerals, their occurrence, importance and development.

== Types of metal used ==
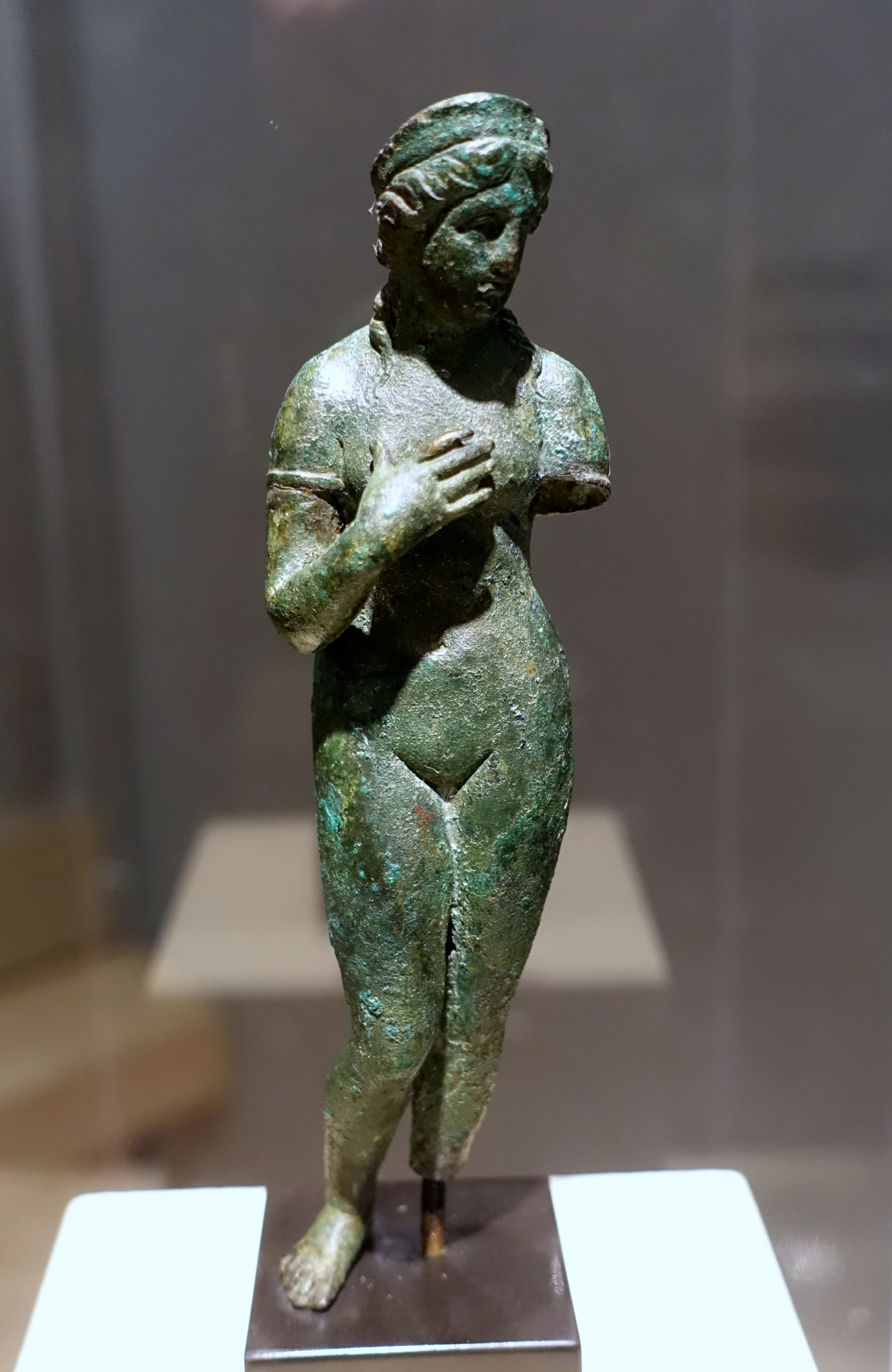
Bronze statuette of Venus, dated to c. AD 118–136.

Many of the first metal artifacts that archaeologists have identified have been tools or weapons, as well as objects used as ornaments such as jewellery. These early metal objects were made of the softer metals; copper, gold, and lead in particular, either as native metals or by thermal extraction from minerals, and softened by minimal heat (Craddock, 1995). While technology did advance to the point of creating surprisingly pure copper, most ancient metals are in fact alloys, the most important being bronze, an alloy of copper and tin. As metallurgical technology developed (hammering, melting, smelting, roasting, cupellation, moulding, smithing, etc.), more metals were intentionally included in the metallurgical repertoire.

By the height of the Roman Empire, metals in use included: silver, zinc, iron, mercury, arsenic, antimony, lead, gold, copper, tin (Healy 1978). As in the Bronze Age, metals were used based on many physical properties: aesthetics, hardness, colour, taste/smell (for cooking wares), timbre (instruments), resistance to corrosion, weight (i.e., density), and other factors. Many alloys were also possible, and were intentionally made in order to change the properties of the metal; e.g. the alloy of predominately tin with lead would harden the soft tin, to create pewter, which would prove its utility as cooking and tableware.

== Sources of ore ==
Sources of ore
Ores and Origin (Healy 1978)
Gold	Iberia, Gaul, Cisalpine Gaul, Britannia, Noricum, Dalmatia, Moesia Superior, Arabia, India, Africa
Silver	Iberia, Gaul, Laurion (Greece), Asia Minor, Carmania, Midian, India, Bactria, Britannia, Cyprus
Copper	Iberia, Gaul, Cisthene, Cyprus, Carmania, Arabia, Aleppo, Sinai, Meroe, Masaesyli , India, Britannia.
Tin	Iberia, Persia, Britannia
Lead	Iberia, Gaul, Sardinia, Sicily, Britannia
Iron	Iberia, Elba, Sardinia, Hallstatt, Noricum, Illyria, Macedonia, Dacia, Sinai, Meroe, Britannia
Zinc	Gaul, Gallia Transpadana, Campania, Germania, Andeira (in Asia Minor), Cyprus
Mercury	Iberia, Armani, Ethiopia
Arsenic	Phalagonia, Carmania
Antimony	Hypothesised: Mytilene, Chios, around Smyrna, Transcaucasia, Persia, Tehran, Punjab, Britannia

Iberia (modern Spain and Portugal) was possibly the Roman province richest in mineral ore, containing deposits of gold, silver, copper, tin, lead, iron, and mercury. From its acquisition after the Second Punic War to the Fall of Rome, Iberia continued to produce a significant amount of Roman metals.

Britannia was also very rich in metals. Gold was mined at Dolaucothi in Wales, copper and tin in Cornwall, and lead in the Pennines, Mendip Hills and Wales. Significant studies have been made on the iron production of Roman Britain; iron use in Europe was intensified by the Romans, and was part of the exchange of ideas between the cultures through Roman occupation. Noricum (modern Austria) was exceedingly rich in gold and iron, Pliny, Strabo, and Ovid all lauded its bountiful deposits. Iron was its main commodity, but alluvial gold was also prospected. By 15 BC, Noricum was officially made a province of the Empire, and the metal trade saw prosperity well into the fifth century AD. Some scholars believe that the art of iron forging was not necessarily created, but well developed in this area and it was the population of Noricum which reminded Romans of the usefulness of iron. For example, of the three forms of iron (wrought iron, steel, and soft), the forms which were exported were of the wrought iron (containing a small percentage of uniformly distributed slag material) and steel (carbonised iron) categories, as pure iron is too soft to function like wrought or steel iron.

Dacia, located in the area of Transylvania, was conquered in 107 AD in order to capture the resources of the region for Rome. The amount of gold that came into Roman possession actually brought down the value of gold. Iron was also of importance to the region. The difference between the mines of Noricum and Dacia was the presence of a slave population as a workforce.

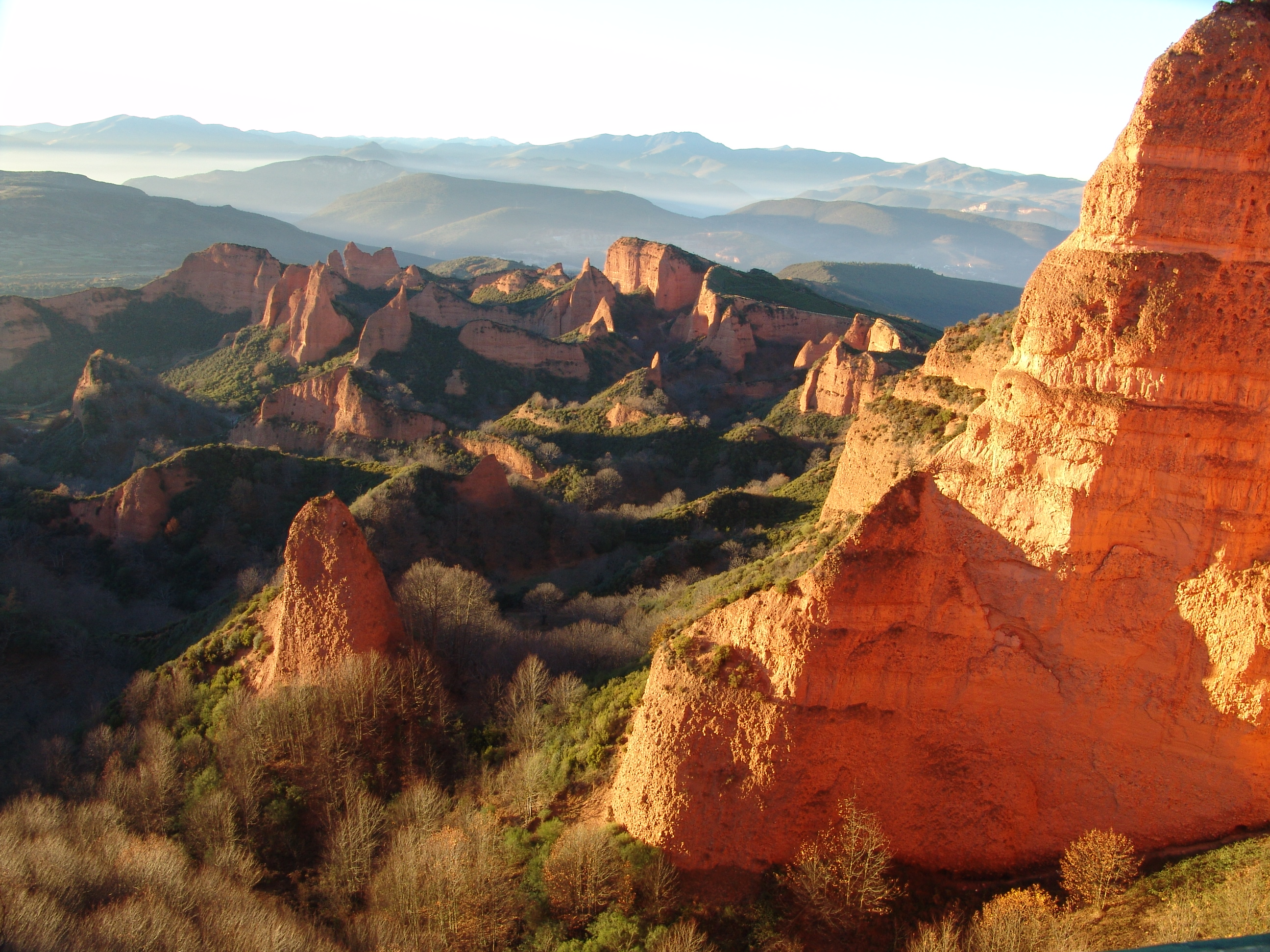
Las Médulas, remains of the most important gold mine in the Roman Empire. The spectacular landscape resulted from the Ruina montium mining technique

== Technology ==
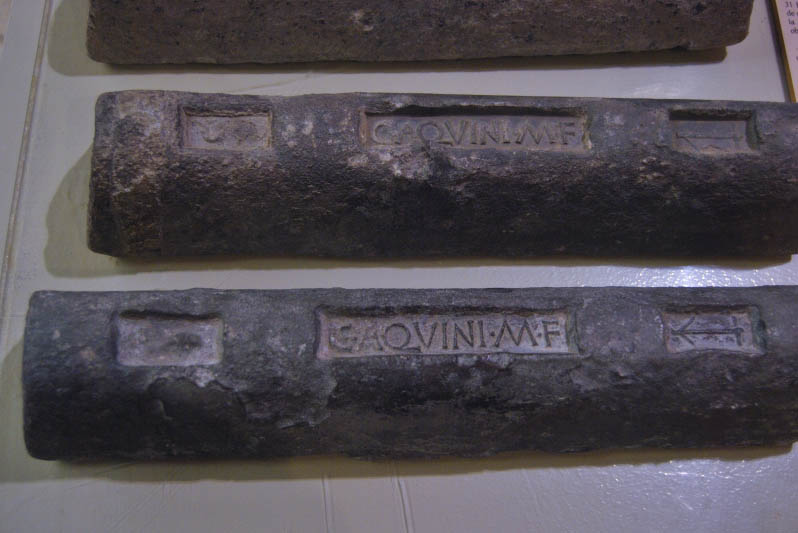
Roman ingots of lead from the mines of Cartagena, Spain, Archaeological Municipal Museum of Cartagena

The earliest metal manipulation was probably hammering (Craddock 1995, 1999), where copper ore was pounded into thin sheets. The ore (if there were large enough pieces of metal separate from mineral) could be beneficiated ('made better') before or after melting, where the prills of metal could be hand-picked from the cooled slag. Melting beneficiated metal also allowed early metallurgists to use moulds and casts to form shapes of molten metal (Craddock 1995). Many of the metallurgical skills developed in the Bronze Age were still in use during Roman times. Melting—the process of using heat to separate slag and metal, smelting—using a reduced oxygen heated environment to separate metal oxides into metal and carbon dioxide, roasting—process of using an oxygen rich environment to isolate sulphur oxide from metal oxide which can then be smelted, casting—pouring liquid metal into a mould to make an object, hammering—using blunt force to make a thin sheet which can be annealed or shaped, and cupellation—separating metal alloys to isolate a specific metal—were all techniques which were well understood (Zwicker 1985, Tylecote 1962, Craddock 1995). However, the Romans provided few new technological advances other than the use of iron and the cupellation and granulation in the separation of gold alloys (Tylecote 1962).

While native gold is common, the ore will sometimes contain small amounts of silver and copper. The Romans utilised a sophisticated system to separate these precious metals. The use of cupellation, a process developed before the rise of Rome, would extract copper from gold and silver, or an alloy called electrum. In order to separate the gold and silver, however, the Romans would granulate the alloy by pouring the liquid, molten metal into cold water, and then smelt the granules with salt, separating the gold from the chemically altered silver chloride (Tylecote 1962). They used a similar method to extract silver from lead.

While Roman production became standardised in many ways, the evidence for distinct unity of furnace types is not strong, alluding to a tendency of the peripheries continuing with their own past furnace technologies. In order to complete some of the more complex metallurgical techniques, there is a bare minimum of necessary components for Roman metallurgy: metallic ore, furnace of unspecified type with a form of oxygen source (assumed by Tylecote to be bellows) and a method of restricting said oxygen (a lid or cover), a source of fuel (charcoal from wood or occasionally peat), moulds and/or hammers and anvils for shaping, the use of crucibles for isolating metals (Zwicker 1985), and likewise cupellation hearths (Tylecote 1962).

== Mechanisation ==
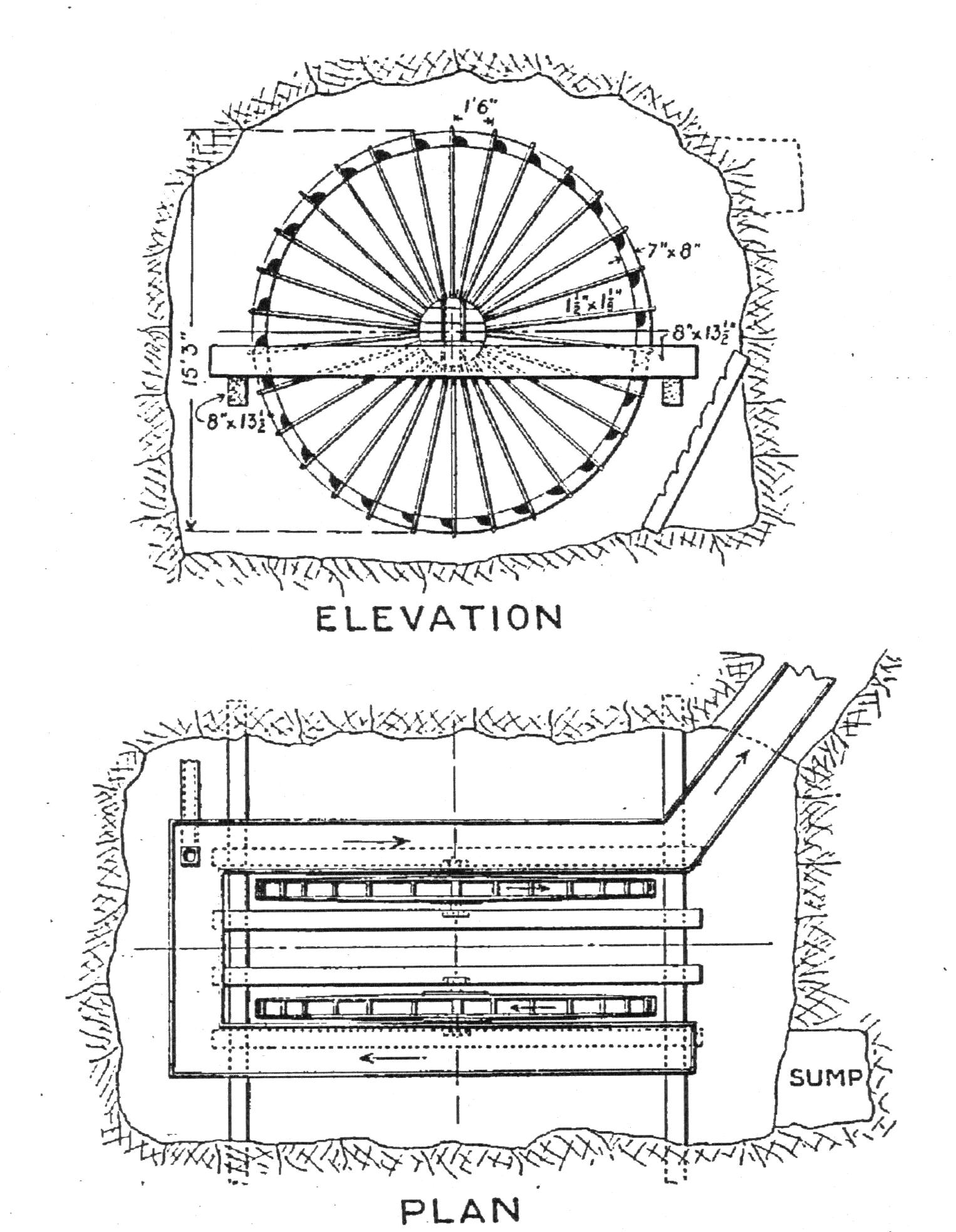
Drainage wheel from Rio Tinto mines

There is direct evidence that the Romans mechanised at least part of the extraction processes. They used water power from water wheels for grinding grains and sawing timber or stone.

A set of eight pairs of water wheels at Barbegal near Arles dates from the late 3rd or early 4th century. The millstones they powered supplied flour for Arles, whose population was about 10,000, and the surrounding area. Multiple grain mills also existed on the Janiculum hill in Rome.

Ausonius attests the use of a water mill for sawing stone in his poem Mosella from the 4th century AD. They could easily have adapted the technology to crush ore using tilt hammers, and just such is mentioned by Pliny the Elder in his Naturalis Historia dating to about 75 AD, and there is evidence for the method from Dolaucothi in South Wales. The Roman gold mines developed from c. 75 AD. The methods survived into the medieval period, as described and illustrated by Georgius Agricola in his De re metallica.

They also used reverse overshot water-wheels for draining mines, the parts being prefabricated and numbered for ease of assembly. Multiple set of such wheels have been found in Spain at the Rio Tinto copper mines and a fragment of a wheel at Dolaucothi. An incomplete wheel from Spain is now on public show in the British Museum.

== Output ==
The invention and widespread application of hydraulic mining, namely hushing and ground-sluicing, aided by the ability of the Romans to plan and execute mining operations on a large scale, allowed various base and precious metals to be extracted on a proto-industrial scale only rarely matched until the Industrial Revolution.

The most common fuel by far for smelting and forging operations, as well as heating purposes, was wood and particularly charcoal, which is nearly twice as efficient. In addition, coal was mined in some regions to a fairly large extent: almost all major coalfields in Roman Britain were exploited by the late 2nd century AD, and a lively trade along the English North Sea coast developed, which extended to the continental Rhineland, where bituminous coal was already used for the smelting of iron ore. The annual iron production at Populonia alone accounted for an estimated 2,000 to 10,000 tons.

Annual metal production in metric tons
	Output per annum	Comment
Iron	82,500 t	Based on estimate of iron production at 1.5 kg per head in Roman Britain, extrapolated to population size of 55 million for entire empire
Copper	15,000 t	Largest preindustrial producer.
Lead	80,000 t	Largest preindustrial producer.
Silver	200 t	At its peak around the mid-2nd century AD, Roman stock is estimated at 10,000 t, five to ten times larger than the combined silver mass of medieval Europe and the Caliphate around 800 AD.
Gold	9 t	Production in Asturia, Callaecia, and Lusitania (all Iberian Peninsula) alone.

== Production of objects ==
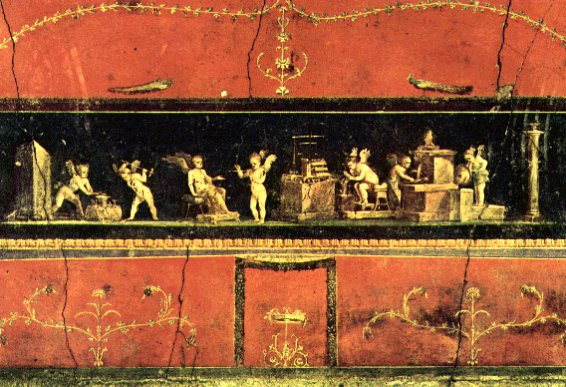
Mural in the House of the Vettii in Pompeii depicting cupids using the tools and techniques of Roman goldsmiths

Romans used many methods to create metal objects. Like Samian ware, moulds were created by making a model of the desired shape (whether through wood, wax, or metal), which would then be pressed into a clay mould. In the case of a metal or wax model, once dry, the ceramic could be heated and the wax or metal melted until it could be poured from the mould (this process utilising wax is called the “lost wax“ technique). By pouring metal into the aperture, exact copies of an object could be cast. This process made the creation of a line of objects quite uniform. This is not to suggest that the creativity of individual artisans did not continue; rather, unique handcrafted pieces were normally the work of small, rural metalworkers on the peripheries of Rome using local techniques (Tylecote 1962).

There is archaeological evidence throughout the Empire demonstrating the large scale excavations, smelting, and trade routes concerning metals. With the Romans came the concept of mass production; this is arguably the most important aspect of Roman influence in the study of metallurgy. Three particular objects produced en masse and seen in the archaeological record throughout the Roman Empire are brooches called fibulae, worn by both men and women (Bayley 2004), coins, and ingots (Hughes 1980). These cast objects can allow archaeologists to trace years of communication, trade, and even historic/stylistic changes throughout the centuries of Roman power.

== Social ramifications ==
=== Slavery ===
When the cost of producing slaves became too high to justify slave labourers for the many mines throughout the empire around the second century, a system of indentured servitude was introduced for convicts. In 369 AD, a law was reinstated due to the closure of many deep mines; the emperor Hadrian had previously given the control of mines to private employers, so that workers were hired rather than working out of force. Through the institution of this system profits increased (Shepard 1993). In the case of Noricum, there is archaeological evidence of freemen labour in the metal trade and extraction through graffiti on mine walls. In this province, many men were given Roman citizenship for their efforts contributing to the procurement of metal for the empire. Both privately owned and government run mines were in operation simultaneously (Shepard 1993).

=== Economy ===
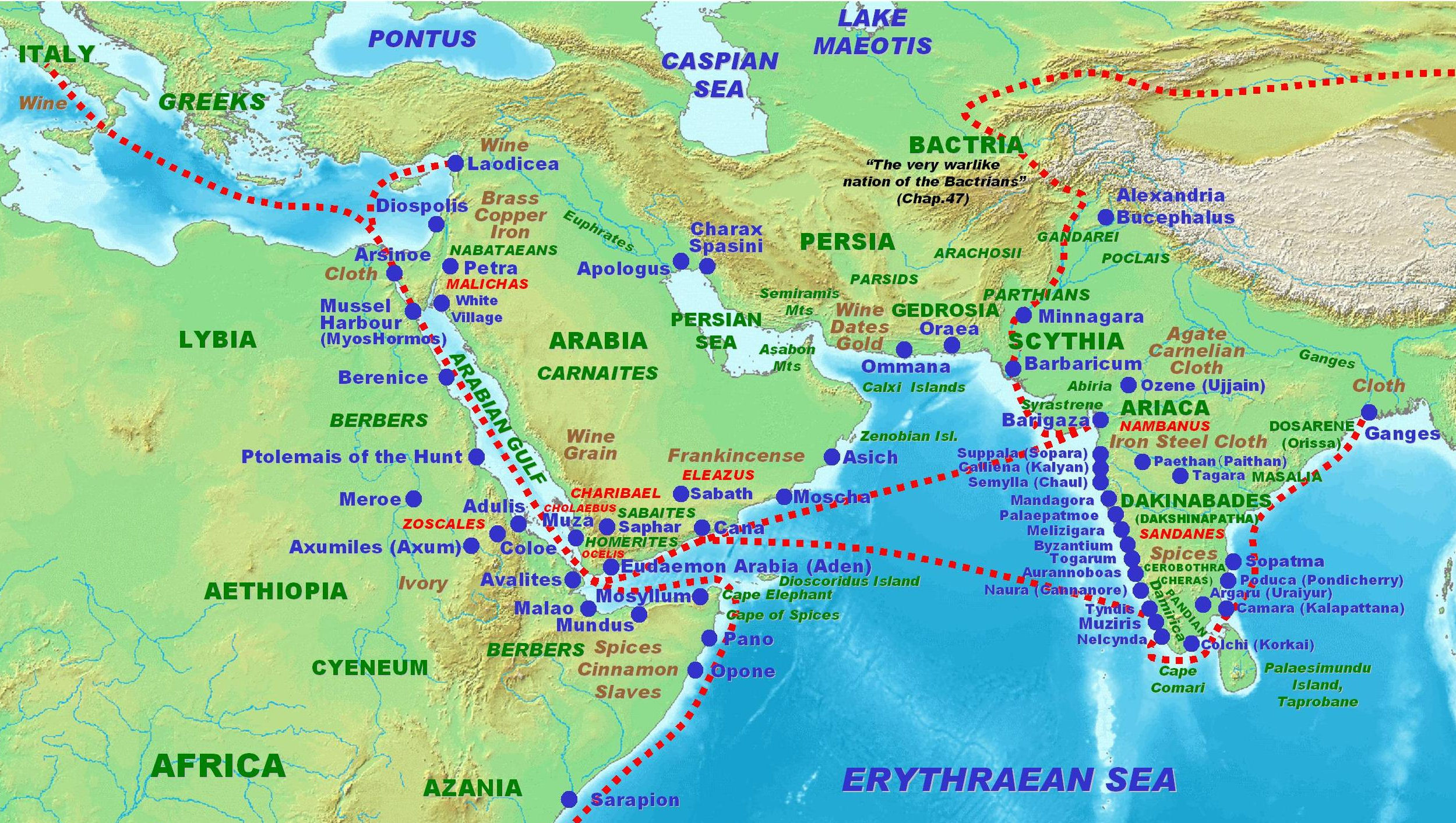
Roman trade routes, according to the Periplus Maris Erythraei 1st century CE

From the formation of the Roman Empire, Rome was an almost completely closed economy, not reliant on imports although exotic goods from trade with India and with China (such as gems, silk and spices) were highly prized (Shepard 1993). Through the recovery of Roman coins and ingots throughout the ancient world (Hughes 1980), metallurgy has supplied the archaeologist with material culture through which to see the expanse of the Roman world.

== See also ==
- Georgius Agricola
- Malvesa
- Mining in ancient Rome
- Mining in Roman Britain
- Roman engineering
- Roman technology

== Sources ==
General

- Aitchison, Leslie. 1960. A History of Metals. London: Macdonald & Evans Ltd.
- Bayley, Justine; Butcher, Sarnia. 2004. Roman Brooches in Britain: A Technological and Typological Study based on the Richborough Collection. London: The Society of Antiquaries of London.
- Craddock, Paul T. 1995. Early Metal Mining and Production. Edinburgh: Edinburgh University Press.
- Craddock, Paul T. 1999. Paradigms of Metallurgical Innovation in Prehistoric Europe in Hauptmann, A., Ernst, P., Rehren, T., Yalcin, U. (eds). The Beginnings of Metallurgy: Proceedings of the International Conference “The Beginnings of Metallurgy”, Bochum 1995. Hamburg
- Davies, O. Roman Mines in Europe 1935., Oxford University Press
- Hughes, M. J. 1980 The Analysis of Roman Tin and Pewter Ingots in Ody, W. A. (ed) Aspects of Early Metallurgy. Occasional Paper No 17. British Museum Occasional Papers.
- Shepard, Robert. 1993. Ancient Mining. London: Elsevier Applied Science.
- Sim, David. 1998. Beyond the Bloom: Bloom Refining and Iron Artifact Production in the Roman World. Ridge, Isabel (ed). BAR International Series 725. Oxford: Archaeopress.
- Tylecote, R.F. 1962. Metallurgy in Archaeology: A Prehistory of Metallurgy in the British Isles. London: Edward Arnold (Publishers) Ltd.
- Zwicker, U., Greiner, H., Hofmann, K-H., Reithinger, M. 1985. Smelting, Refining and Alloying of Copper and Copper Alloys in Crucible Furnaces During Prehistoric up to Roman Times in Craddock, P.T., Hughes, M.J. (eds) Furnaces and Smelting Technology in Antiquity. Occasional Paper No 48. London: British Museum Occasional Papers.
- J. S., Hodgkinson. 2008. "The Wealden Iron Industry." (The History Press, Stroud).
- Cleere, Henry. 1981. The Iron Industry of Roman Britain. Wealden Iron Research Group.

Output

- Callataÿ, François de (2005): "The Graeco-Roman Economy in the Super Long-Run: Lead, Copper, and Shipwrecks", Journal of Roman Archaeology, Vol. 18, pp. 361–372
- Cech, Brigitte (2010): Technik in der Antike, Wissenschaftliche Buchgesellschaft, Darmstadt, ISBN 978-3-8062-2080-3
- Cleere, H. & Crossley, D. (1995): The Iron industry of the Weald. 2nd edition, Merton Priory Press, Cardiff, ISBN 1-898937-04-4: republishing the 1st edition (Leicester University Press 1985) with a supplement.
- Cleere, Henry. 1981. The Iron Industry of Roman Britain. Wealden Iron Research Group. p. 74-75
- Craddock, Paul T. (2008): "Mining and Metallurgy", in: Oleson, John Peter (ed.): The Oxford Handbook of Engineering and Technology in the Classical World, Oxford University Press, ISBN 978-0-19-518731-1, pp. 93–120
- Healy, John F. (1978): Mining and Metallurgy in the Greek and Roman World, Thames and Hudson, London, ISBN 0-500-40035-0
- Hong, Sungmin; Candelone, Jean-Pierre; Patterson, Clair C.; Boutron, Claude F. (1994): "Greenland Ice Evidence of Hemispheric Lead Pollution Two Millennia Ago by Greek and Roman Civilizations", Science, Vol. 265, No. 5180, pp. 1841–1843
- Hong, Sungmin; Candelone, Jean-Pierre; Patterson, Clair C.; Boutron, Claude F. (1996): "History of Ancient Copper Smelting Pollution During Roman and Medieval Times Recorded in Greenland Ice", Science, Vol. 272, No. 5259, pp. 246–249
- Patterson, Clair C. (1972): "Silver Stocks and Losses in Ancient and Medieval Times", The Economic History Review, Vol. 25, No. 2, pp. 205–235
- Lewis, P. R. and G. D. B. Jones, The Dolaucothi gold mines, I: the surface evidence, The Antiquaries Journal, 49, no. 2 (1969): 244-72.
- Lewis, P. R. and G. D. B. Jones, Roman gold-mining in north-west Spain, Journal of Roman Studies 60 (1970): 169-85.
- Lewis, P. R., The Ogofau Roman gold mines at Dolaucothi, The National Trust Year Book 1976-77 (1977).
- Settle, Dorothy M.; Patterson, Clair C. (1980): "Lead in Albacore: Guide to Lead Pollution in Americans", Science, Vol. 207, No. 4436, pp. 1167–1176
- Sim, David; Ridge, Isabel (2002): Iron for the Eagles. The Iron Industry of Roman Britain, Tempus, Stroud, Gloucestershire, ISBN 0-7524-1900-5
- Smith, A. H. V. (1997): "Provenance of Coals from Roman Sites in England and Wales", Britannia, Vol. 28, pp. 297–324
- Wilson, Andrew (2002): "Machines, Power and the Ancient Economy", The Journal of Roman Studies, Vol. 92, pp. 1–32
