= Mining in Roman Britain =

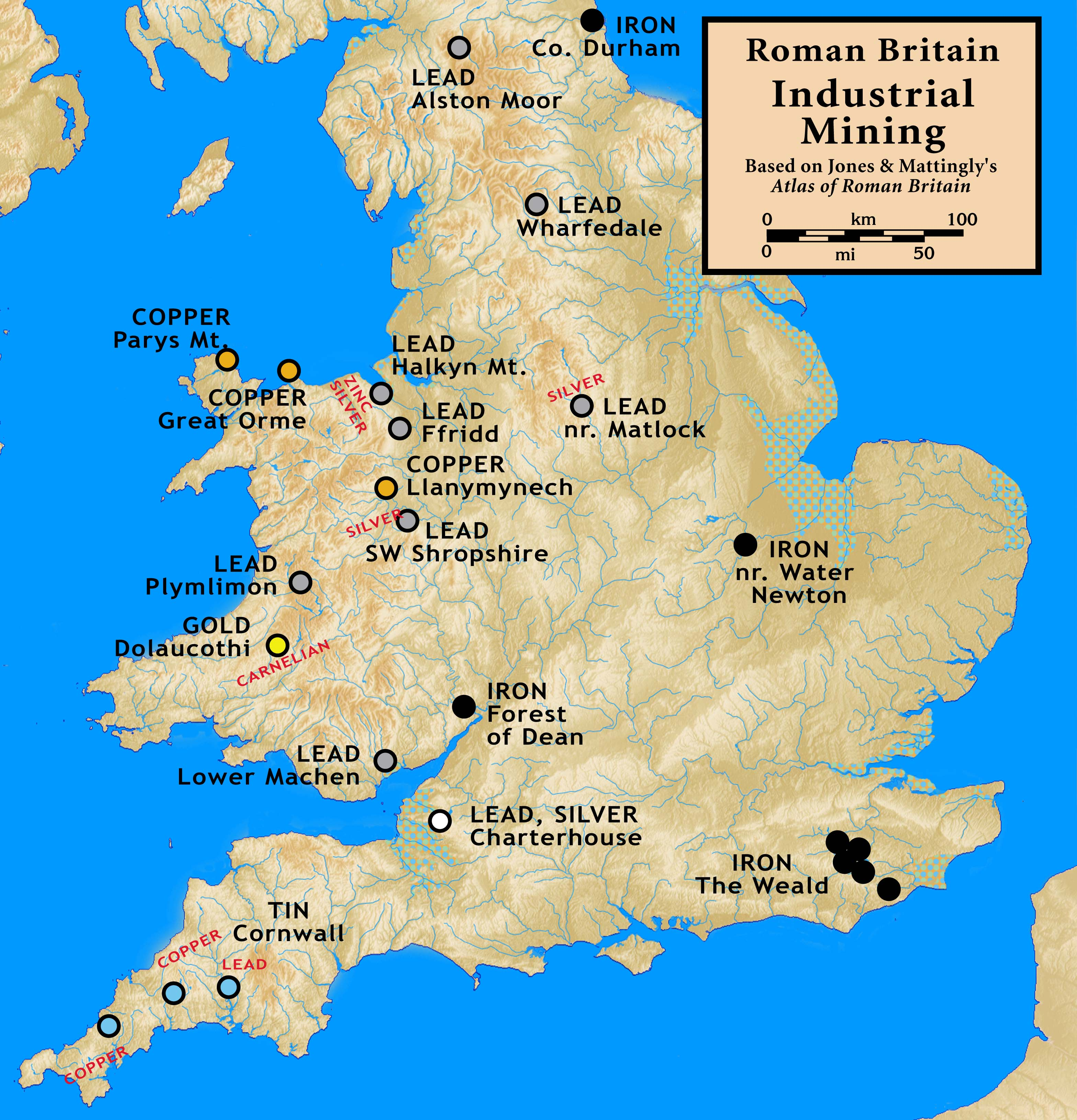
Map of the mines and resources in Roman Britain.

Mining was one of the most prosperous activities in Roman Britain. Britain was rich in resources such as copper, gold, iron, lead, salt, silver, and tin, materials in high demand in the Roman Empire. Sufficient supply of metals was needed to fulfil the demand for coinage and luxury artefacts by the elite. The Romans started panning and puddling for gold. The abundance of mineral resources in the British Isles was probably one of the reasons for the Roman conquest of Britain. They were able to use advanced technology to find, develop and extract valuable minerals on a scale unequaled until the Middle Ages.

== Tin mining ==
Tin mining in Britain has prehistoric roots, extraction and the alloying with copper being dated to c. 2000 BC. Tin ingots produced in Cornwall, during the second millennia BC, have been found as far away as a shipwreck off the Levantine coast. The historic record of British tin extraction is credited to either Herodotus, his Histories describing the Tin Islands, as does Hecataeus of Miletus Journey round the World, both in the 5th century BC. The 4th century BC, Greek, Timaeus, also quoted by Pliny, and 1st century BC Diodorus Siculus and Posidonius all wrote on tin Mining in Cornwall and Devon. Tin production is also offered as one of the primary factors for the 1st century CE Roman invasion, conquest, and occupation of Britannia, with tin, lead, iron, silver, and gold extraction increasing throughout the Roman period.

== Lead mining ==
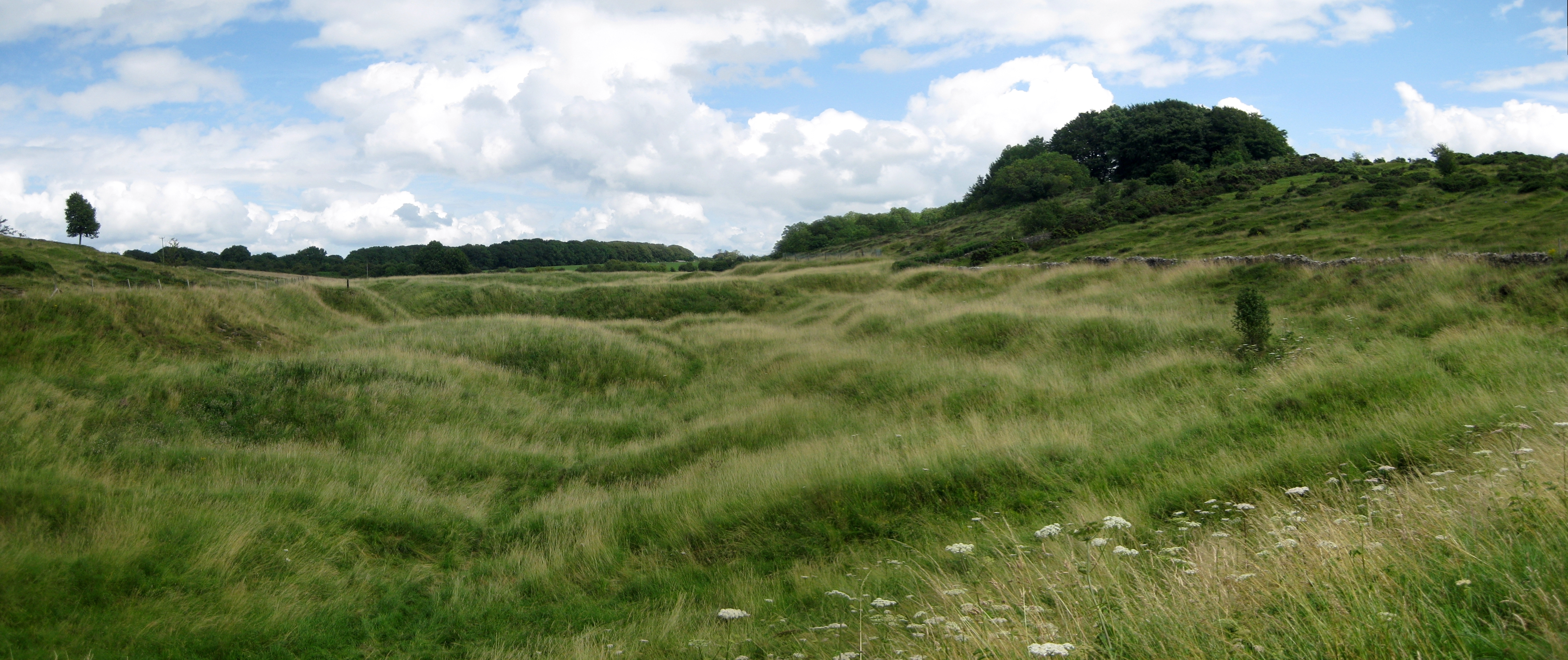
Roman lead mines at Charterhouse, Somerset

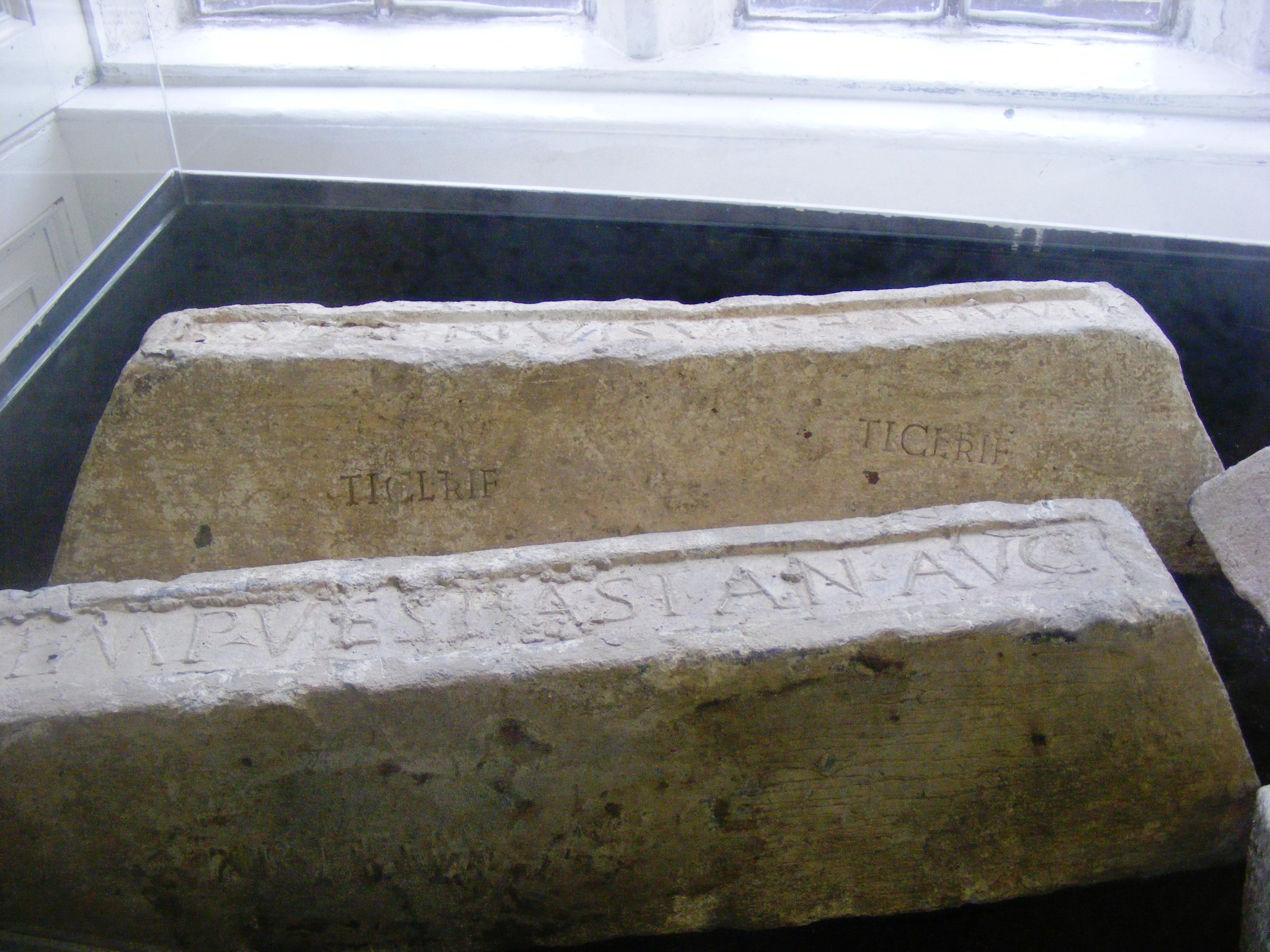
Lead ingots from Roman Britain on display at the Wells and Mendip Museum

Lead was essential to the smooth running of the Roman Empire. It was used for piping for aqueducts and plumbing, pewter, coffins, and gutters for villas, as well as a source of the silver that sometimes occurred in the same mineral deposits. Fifty-two sheets of Mendip lead still line the great bath at Bath which is a few miles from Charterhouse (see below).

The largest Roman lead mines were located in or near the Rio Tinto (river) in southern Hispania. In Britannia the largest sources were at Mendip, South West England and especially at Charterhouse. In A.D. 49, six years after the invasion and conquest of Britain, the Romans had the lead mines of Mendip and those of Derbyshire, Shropshire, Yorkshire and Wales running at full shift. By A.D.70, Britain had surpassed Hispania as the leading lead-producing province. The Spanish soon lodged a complaint with the Emperor Vespasian, who in turn put limits on the amount of lead being produced in Britain. However British lead production continued to increase and ingots (or pigs) of lead have been found datable to the late second - early third century. Research has found that British lead (i.e. Somerset lead) was used in Pompeii - the town destroyed in the eruption of Vesuvius in A.D.79.

The Romans mined lead from the Mendips, Derbyshire, Durham, and Northumberland. The silver content of ores from these areas was significantly lower than Athenian lead-silver mines and Asia Minor mines.

Smelting is used to convert lead into its purest form. The extraction of lead occurs in a double decomposition reaction as the components of galena are decomposed to create lead. Sulfide is the reducing agent in this reaction, and fuel is only needed for high temperature maintenance. Lead must first be converted to its oxide form by roasting below 800C using domestic fire, charcoal or dry wood. This is done easily as lead melts at 327C. Lead oxide (PbO) is the oxide form of galena which reacts with the unroasted form lead sulfide (PbS) to form lead (Pb) and sulfur dioxide (SO2).

Details on Roman lead smelting have not been published even though open hearths were found in the Mendips by Rahtz and Boon. These remains contained smelted and unsmelted ores. The remains of first-century smelting were found in Pentre, Ffwrndan. Although this discovery was valuable, reconstruction of the remains were impossible due to damage. An extracted ore from the site had a lead content of 3 oz. (5 dwt) per ton and another piece contained 9 oz. (16 dwt) per ton of lead.

== Silver extraction ==
The most important use of lead was the extraction of silver. Lead and silver were often found together in the form of galena, an abundant lead ore. Galena is mined in the form of cubes and concentrated by removing the ore-bearing rocks. It is often recognized by its high density and dark colour. The Roman economy was based on silver, as the majority of higher value coins were minted from the precious metal. British ores found in Laurion, Greece had a low silver content compared to the ores mined from other locations. The Romans used the term 'British silver' for these lead mines.

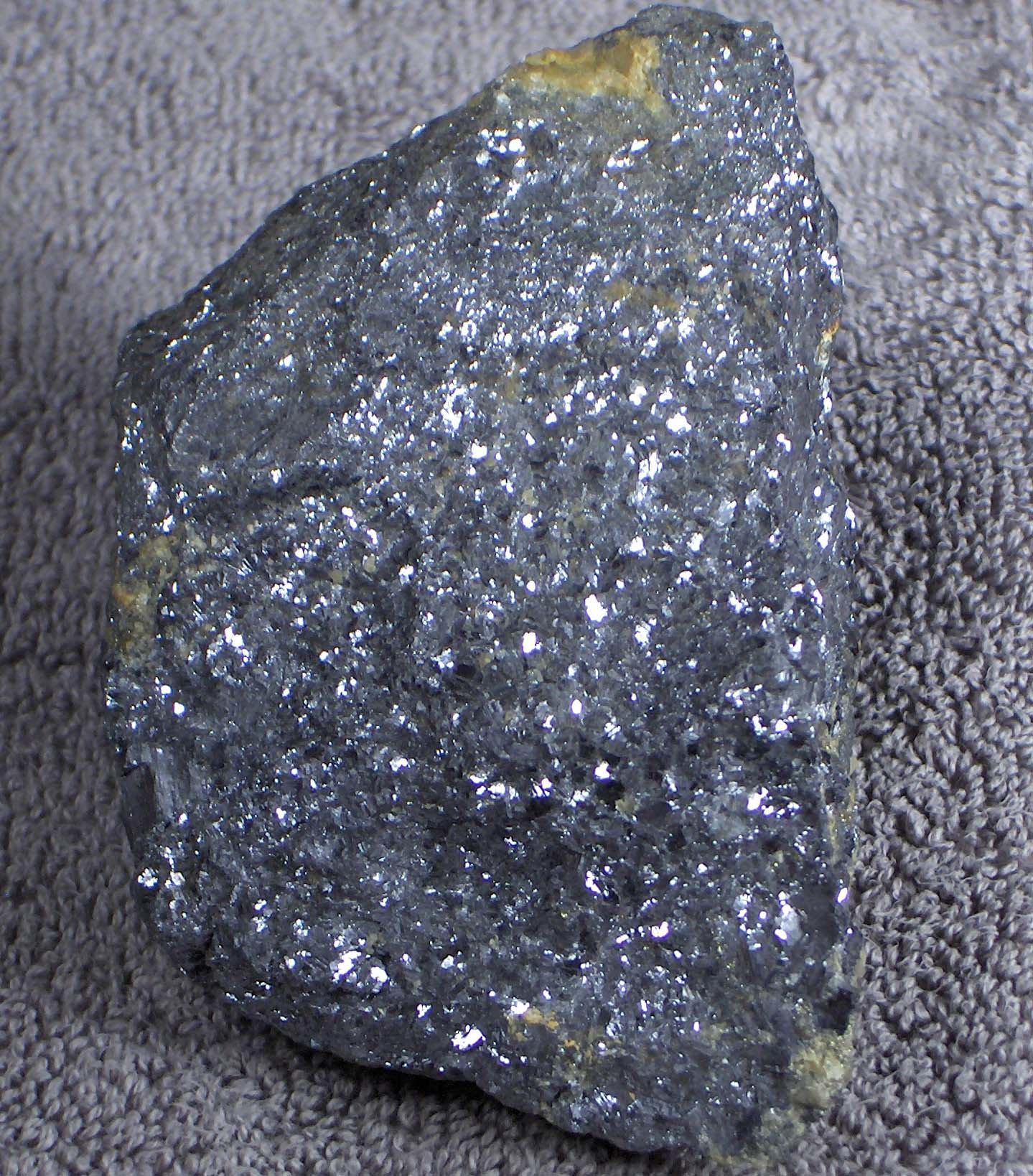
Galena was mined for its lead and silver content.

The process of extraction, cupellation, was fairly simple. First, the ore was smelted until the lead, which contained the silver, separated from the rock. The lead was removed, and further heated up to 1100° Celsius using hand bellows. At this point, the silver was separated from the lead (the lead, in the form of litharge, was either blown off the molten surface or absorbed into bone ash crucibles; the litharge was re-smelted to recover the lead), and was put into moulds which, when cooled, would form ingots that were to be sent all over the Roman Empire for minting. Silchester, Wroxeter, and Hengisbury Head were known locations for Roman cupellation remains.

When inflation took hold in the third century A.D. and official coins began to be minted made of bronze with a silver wash, two counterfeit mints appeared in Somerset - one on the Polden Hills just south of the Mendips, and the other at Whitchurch, Bristol to the north. These mints, using Mendip silver, produced coins which were superior in silver content to those issued by the official Empire mints. Samples of these coins and of their moulds can be seen in the Museum of Somerset in Taunton Castle.

== Copper mining ==
Copper alloy was mostly utilized in Roman Britain to make brooches, spoons, coins, statuettes and other things needed for armour. It was rarely used in it purest form; thus, it always contained other elements such as tin, zinc or lead, which added various properties to the alloy. Pure copper has a pinkish colour and, with the addition of a few percentage of other elements, its colour may change to pale brown, white or yellow.

The composition of copper alloy differed from region to region in the Roman Empire. Leaded and unleaded bronze were mainly used in the Mediterranean period. These types of bronze were produced by adding tin and lead to copper in certain amounts that depended on the type of object being produced. 5% to 15% of tin was added to bronze for casting of most objects. Mirrors, on the other hand, were made with bronze that had approximately 20% tin as it needed a speculum, which is a silvery-white alloy.

Another copper alloy, brass, was not widely used in casting objects as it was very difficult to produce. The production of brass did not begin until the development of the cementation process. In this process, zinc ore and pure copper are heated in a sealed crucible. As the zinc ore is turned into zinc, the seal in the crucible traps the zinc vapour inside, which will then mix with the pure copper to produce brass. The production of brass through this process was controlled by 'state monopoly' as brass was being utilized for coins and military equipments. The production of sestertii and dupondii from brass was established by the Augustan period and brass was also utilized in production of other military fittings such as lorica segmentata.

== Gold mining ==
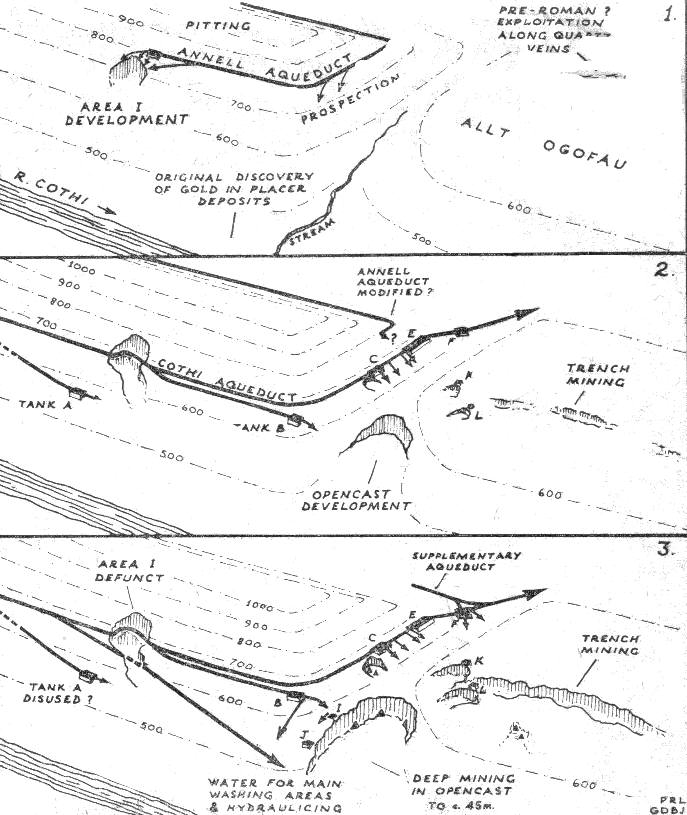
Development of Dolaucothi Gold Mines

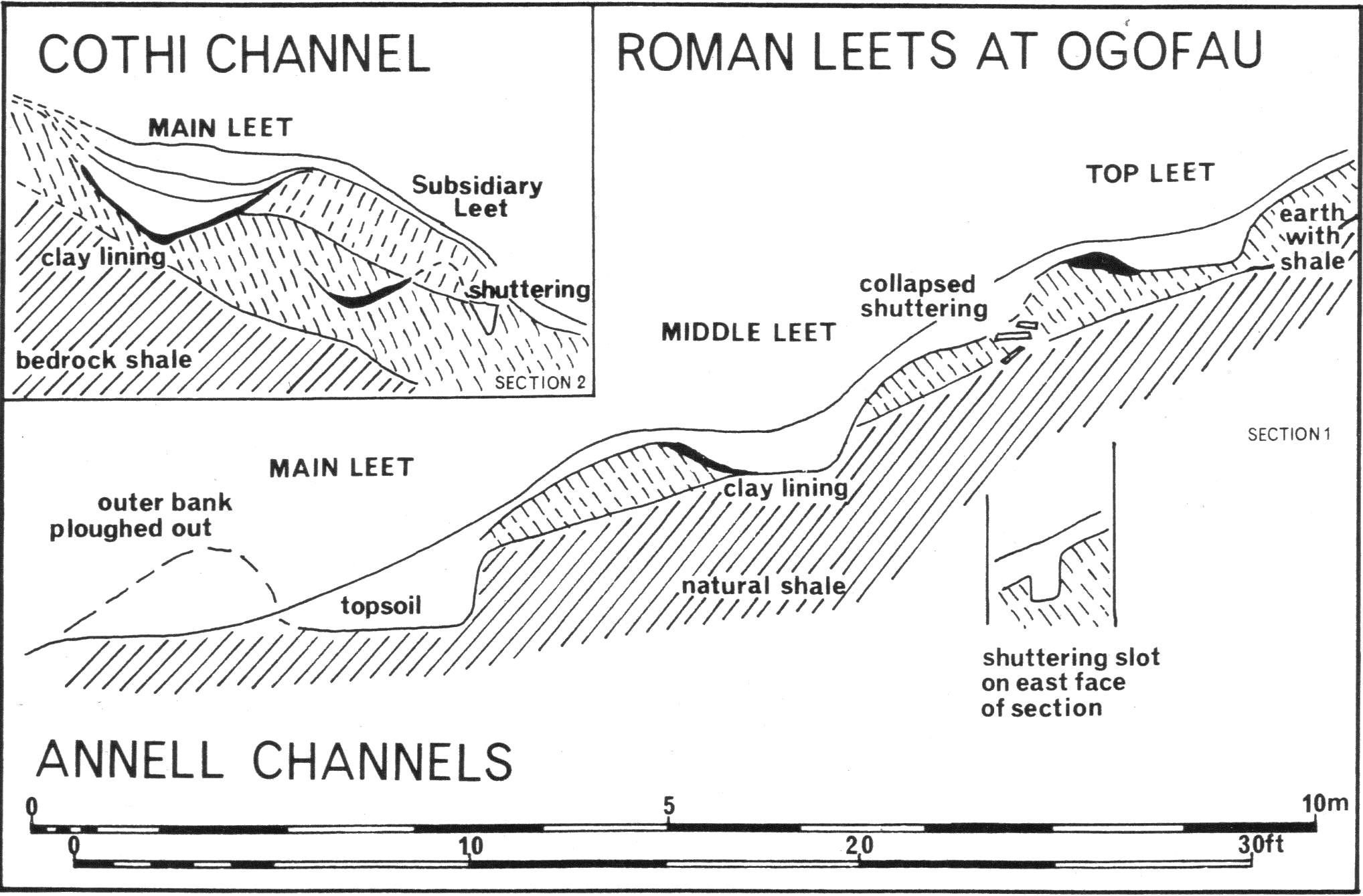
The aqueducts at Dolaucothi

Gold was mined in Linlithgow (Scotland), Cornwall (England), the Dolaucothi Gold Mines (Wales), and other British Isles locations. Melting was necessary for this form of native gold as it is found in a form of leaves or filaments.

Britain's gold mines were located in Wales at Dolaucothi. The Romans discovered the Dolaucothi vein soon after their invasion, and they used hydraulic mining methods to prospect the hillsides before discovering rich veins of gold-bearing quartzite. The remains of several aqueducts and water tanks above the mine are still visible today. The tanks were used to hold water for hushing during prospecting for veins, and involved releasing a wave of water to scour the ground and remove overburden, and expose the bedrock. If a vein was found, then it would be attacked using fire-setting, a method which involved building a fire against the rock. When the hot rock was quenched with water, it could be broken up easily, and the barren debris swept away using another wave of water. The technique produced numerous opencasts which are still visible in the hills above Pumsaint or Luentinum today. A fort, settlement and bath-house were set up nearby in the Cothi Valley. The methods were probably used elsewhere for lead and tin mining, and indeed, were used widely before explosives made them redundant. Hydraulic mining is however, still used for the extraction of alluvial tin.

Long drainage adits were dug into one of the hills at Dolaucothi, after opencast mining methods were no longer effective. Once the ore was removed, it would be crushed by heavy hammers, probably automated by a water wheel until reduced to a fine dust. Then, the dust would be washed in a stream of water where the rocks and other debris would be removed, the gold dust and flakes collected, and smelted into ingots. The ingots would be sent all across the Roman world, where they would be minted or put into vaults.

== Iron mining ==
Armour, construction tools, agricultural tools, and other building materials were mostly made of iron; thus, making iron one of the most in demand metals at all times. There was always a supply for iron in many parts of the Roman Empire to allow for self sufficiency.

There were many iron mines in Roman Britain. The index to the Ordnance Survey Map of Roman Britain lists 33 iron mines: 67% of these are in the Weald and 15% in the Forest of Dean. Because iron ores were widespread and iron was relatively cheap, the location of iron mines was often determined by the availability of wood, which Britain had in abundance, to make charcoal smelting fuel. Great amounts of iron were needed for the Roman war machine, and Britain was the perfect place to fill that need.

Many underground mines were constructed by the Romans. Once the raw ore was removed from the mine, it would be crushed, then washed. The less dense rock would wash away, leaving behind the iron oxide, which would then be smelted with the bloomery method. Mixed with charcoal, the iron ore was heated in a low furnace below the melting point to avoid creating pig iron, and to allow the reduced iron to agglomerate in a Play-Doh like state. The slag was taped out and disposed in very large quantities, allowing easy identification of the sites by archeologists, and sometimes used as road construction material. The extracted bloom iron was roughly hammered and probably sold as is to forges for further refining and use.

Roman iron was thought to hold more value than other metals due to the tedious production through direct or bloomery smelting. A recovered Vindolanda tablet documents the purchase of 90 Roman pounds of iron for 32 denarii by a man named Ascanius. This amounted to 1.1 denarii per kilogram of iron.

== Coal ==
For both domestic and industrial use, coal provided a considerable proportion of the fuel required for warmth, metal-working (coal was not suitable for the smelting of iron, but was more efficient than charcoal at the forging stage) and the production of bricks, tiles and pottery. This is demonstrated by archaeological evidence from sites as far apart as Bath, Somerset (the temple of Sulis and household hypocausts), military encampments along Hadrian's Wall (where outcrop coal was worked near the outlying fortlet at Moresby), forts of the Antonine Wall, Carmel lead mines in north Wales and tile kilns at Holt, Clwyd. Excavations at the inland port of Heronbridge on the River Dee show that there was an established distribution network in place. Coal from the East Midlands coalfields was carried along the Car Dyke for use in forges to the north of Duroliponte (Cambridge) and for drying grain from this rich cereal-growing region. Extraction was not limited to open-cast exploitation of outcrops near the surface: shafts were dug and coal was hewn from horizontal galleries following the coal seams.

== Salt ==
In Britain, lead salt pans were used by the Romans at Middlewich, Nantwich and Northwich and excavations at Middlewich and Nantwich have revealed extensive salt-making settlements. Roman soldiers were partly paid in salt. It is said to be from this that we get the word soldier – 'sal dare', meaning to give salt. Salt would've also been used for food.

== Working conditions ==
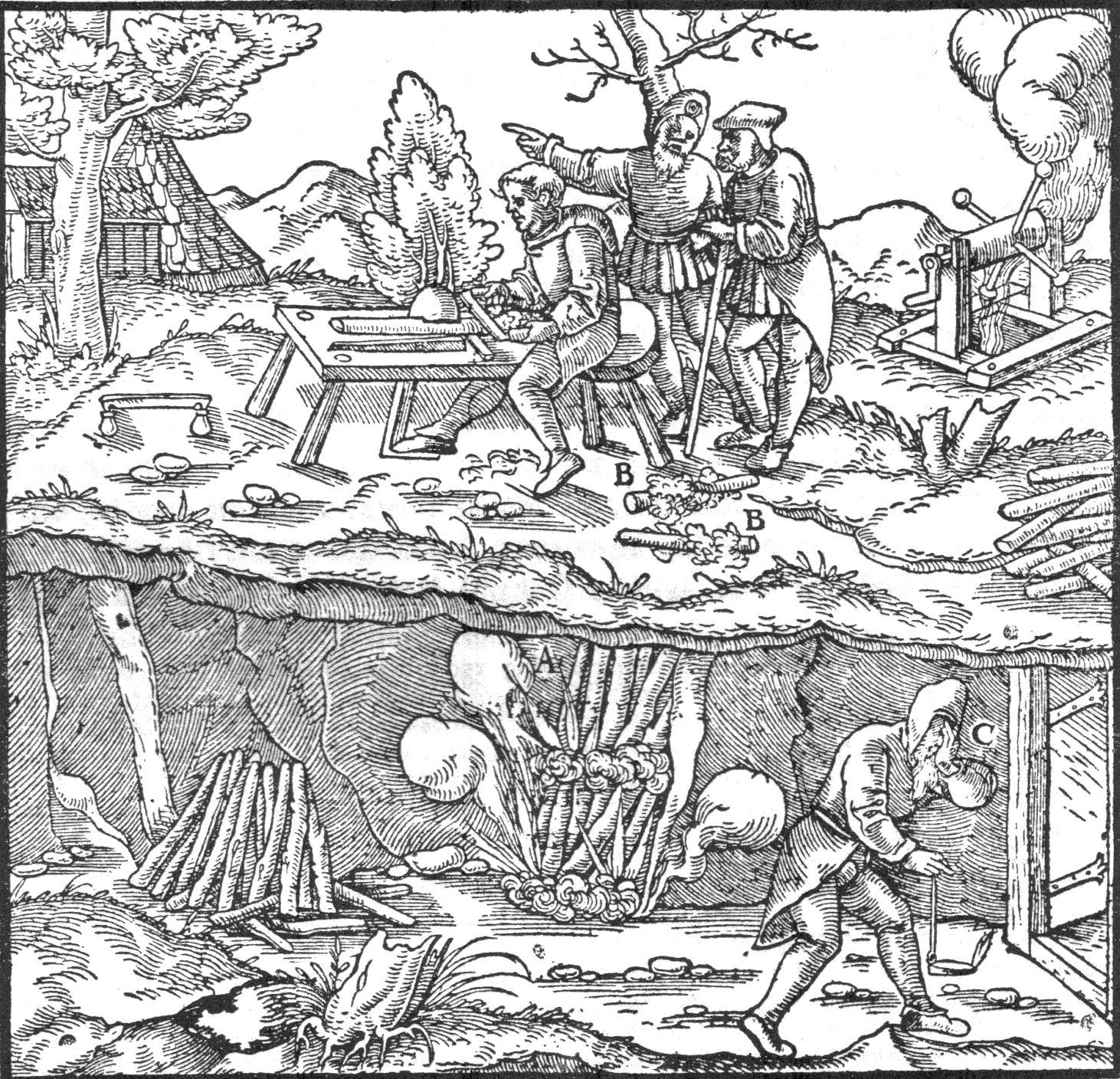
Fire-setting underground from De Re Metallica

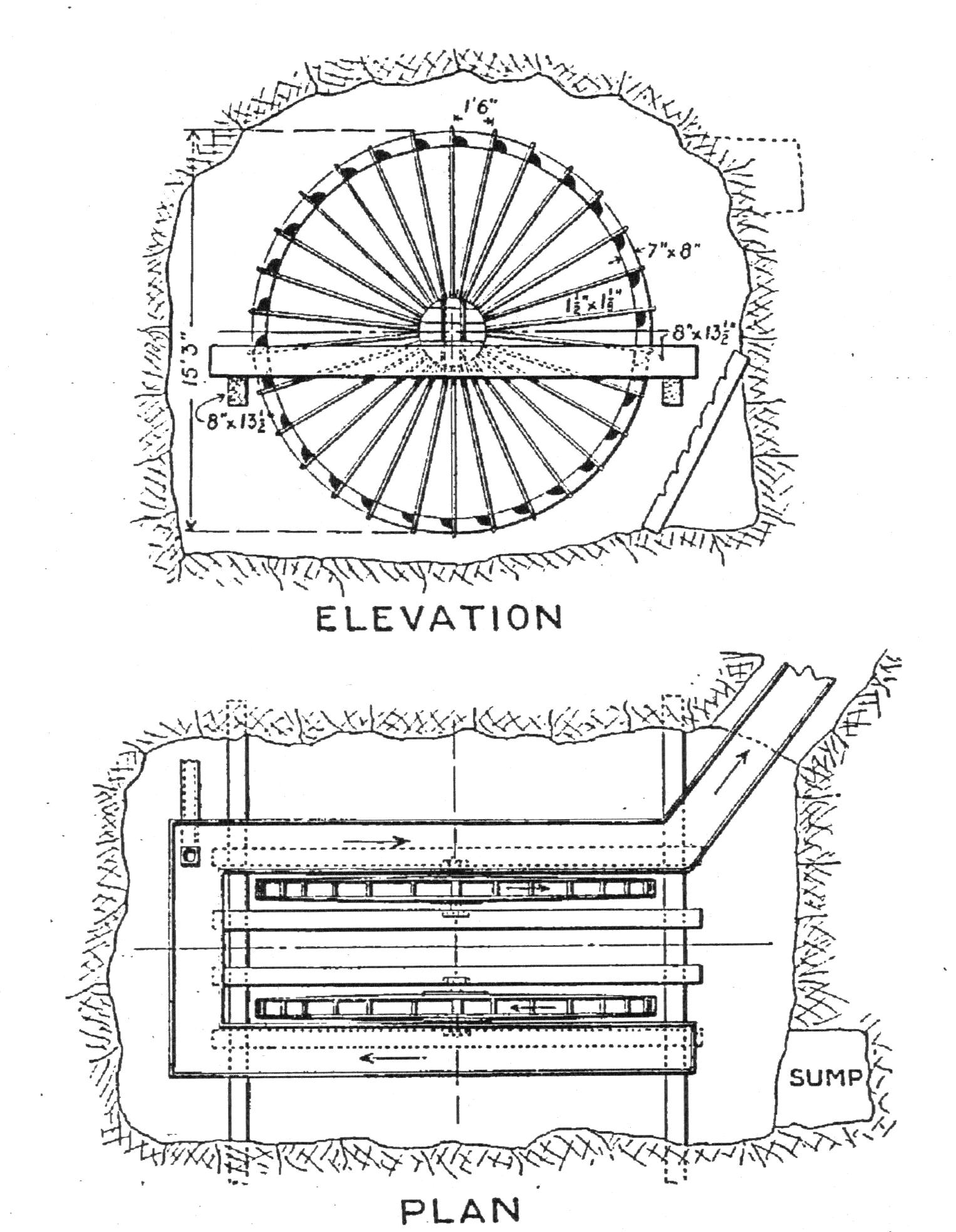
Drainage wheel from Rio Tinto mines

Some miners may have been slaves, but skilled artisans were needed for building aqueducts and leats as well as the machinery needed to dewater mines and to crush and separate the ore from barren rock. Reverse overshot water-wheels were used to lift water, and sequences of such wheels have been found in the Spanish mines. A large section of a wheel from Rio Tinto can be seen in the British Museum, and a smaller fragment of a wheel found at Dolaucothi shows they used similar methods in Britain.

The working conditions were poor, especially when using fire-setting under ground, an ancient mining method used before explosives became common. It involved building a fire against a hard rock face, then quenching the hot rock with water, so that the thermal shock cracked the rock and allowed the minerals to be extracted. The method is described by Diodorus Siculus when he discussed the gold mines of Ancient Egypt in the first century BC, and at a much later date by Georg Agricola in his De Re Metallica of the 16th century. Every attempt was made to ventilate the deep mines, by driving many long adits for example, so as to ensure adequate air circulation. The same adits also served to drain the workings.

== Fall of the metal economy ==
The Roman economy depended on the abundant metals that were mined in many regions. Approximately 100,000 tons of lead and 15,000 tons of copper were sourced within the imperial territory and about 2,250 tons of iron were produced each year. This abundance and extensive production of metal contributed to the pollution in Greenland ice, and it also affected the metal industry as more and more inexpensive metals were available throughout the empire.

The production and availability of smelted metal started to cease during the late fourth century as the Romano-British economy began to decline. The only solution for people who needed metals as part of their livelihood was to scavenge for metal scraps. This is evident from the excavated metalworks from Southwark and Ickham. By the end of fourth century Britain was unable to sustain the need for metals, and so many metal-working sites were abandoned and skilled workers were left with no jobs.

== See also ==
- Mining in ancient Rome
- Derbyshire lead mining history
- Dolaucothi Gold Mines
- Metal mining in Wales
- Roman engineering
- Roman technology
- Roman metallurgy
