= Malvesa =

Roman-founded town in Dalmatia

Coordinates: 43°58′31″N 19°32′08″E

Malvesa was a town founded by the Romans in the extreme northeastern part of the province of Dalmatia in the 2nd century AD. It was a new town in a relatively remote area intended principally as a mining center. It was located in vicinity of Skelani on the Drina River.

Other towns were also established around the same time in northeast Dalmatia, also as mining colonies, including Domavia (now Gradina), Argentaria (Srebrenica near a silver mine), and the municipium S. (the name survives only as an abbreviation) near what is now Pljevlja in northern Montenegro.
