= Mining in ancient Rome =

Mining practices in ancient Rome

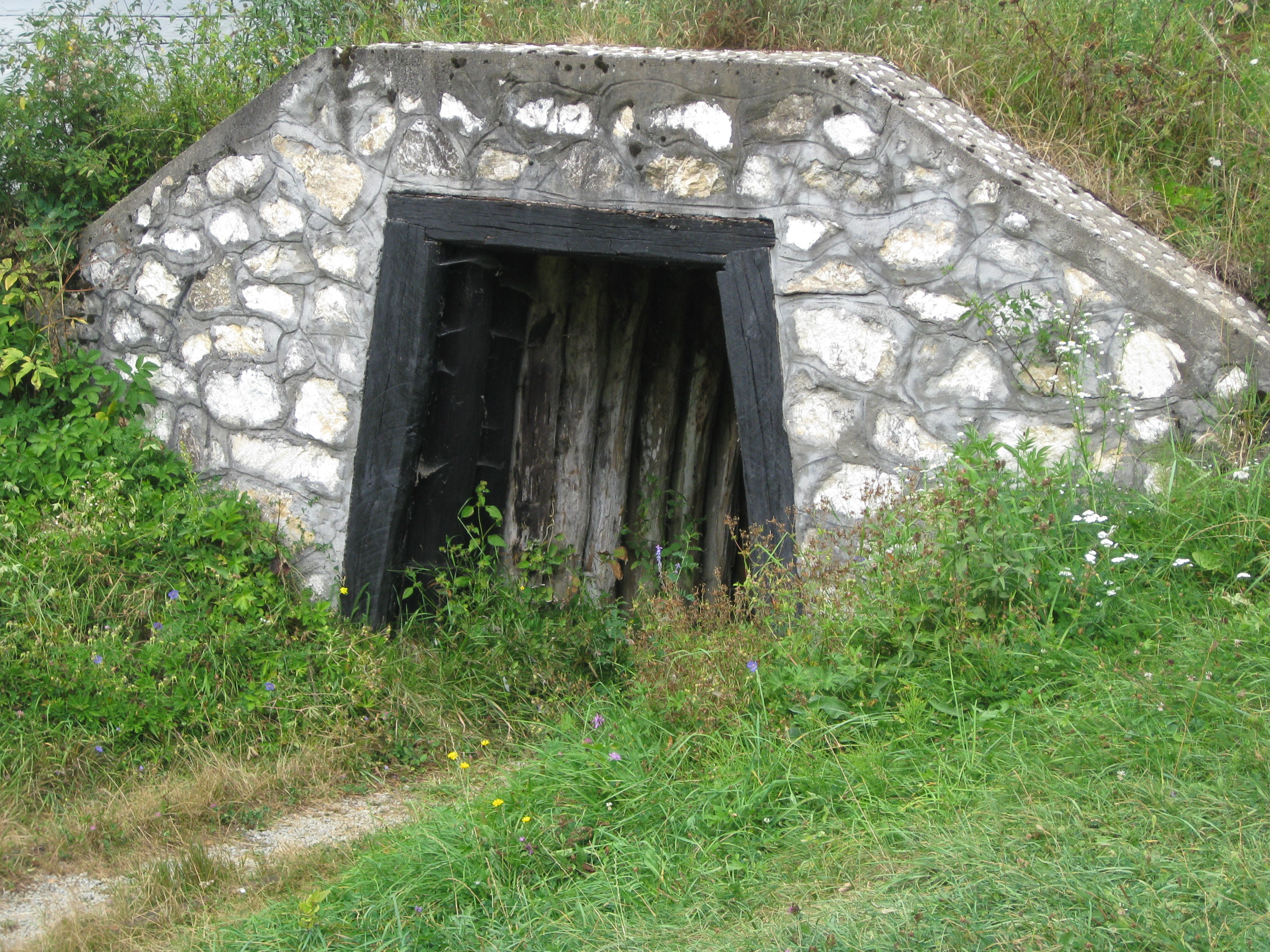
Entrance to a Roman gold mine

Mining in ancient Rome utilized hydraulic mining and shaft mining techniques in combination with equipment such as the Archimedes screw. The materials they produced were used to craft pipes or construct buildings. Quarries were often built through trial trenching and they used tools such as wedges to break the rock apart, which would then be transported using cairns and slipways. Mines typically used slaves and lower-class individuals to extract and process ore. Usually their working conditions were dangerous and inhumane, resulting in frequent accidents and even suicidal ideation. These areas were divided into districts and were regulated by several laws such as the lex metalli vispascensis.

== Technology ==
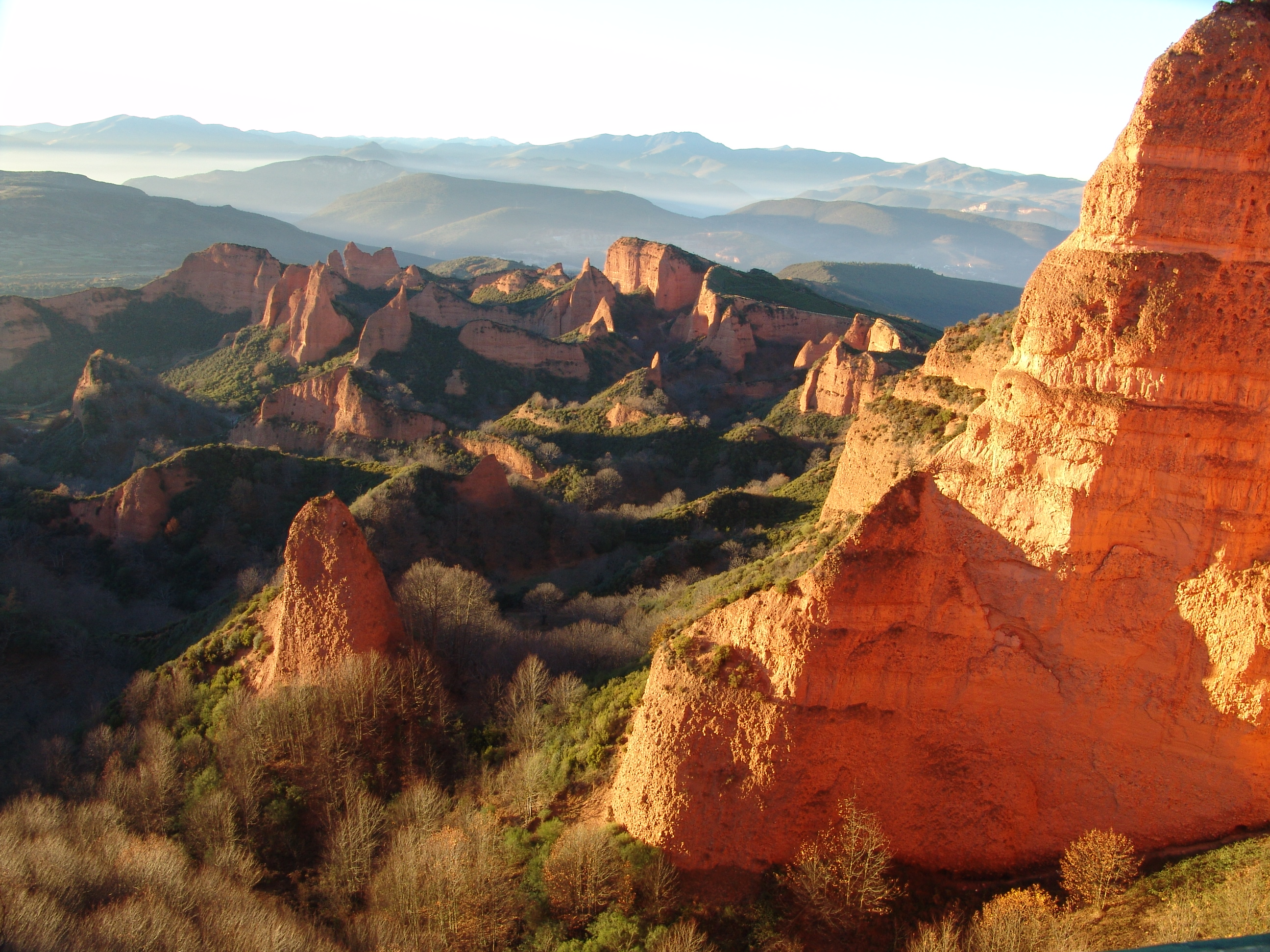
Panoramic view of Las Médulas, a gold-mining site in Spain where the Romans used sluicing techniques

=== Hydraulic mining ===
The Romans used hushing, a method of hydraulic mining that uses water to erode the rock. This would be accomplished by using holes to funnel water into the area, thus breaking it up. The water was supplied to the area through aqueducts, and it would then be stored in a tank, which would flood the area when opened. Following this process, fire was used to heat the rock, which was subsequently quenched with water, thus cracking the rock through thermal shock. The Romans also used ground sluicing, which is the use of tunneling equipment or excavation equipment to mine stream beds. An example of this has been excavated from a site on the Segre River, six miles from the Roman city of Iulia Livica (present-day Llívia) in the Pyrenees.

=== Shaft sinking ===
Shaft sinking was the most dangerous and most difficult form of mining in ancient Rome. Due to its high cost, it was only used to collect the most valuable metals in Roman society. This technique involved digging tunnels underground, allowing workers to extract the ore. Access to these mines and tunnels was provided by shafts which were usually around 3–6 square feet (0.28–0.56 m^{2}) and lined with wood. They also served as ventilation. Roman mines were notorious for their poor ventilation systems. Poisonous gasses often poured into the mines, and noxious air was common in silver mines.

=== Underground mining ===
Scheme of a Roman waterwheel

Underground mining in ancient Rome required the usage of tunnels and shafts. Before those necessities could be constructed water needed to be extracted from these areas, which would be accomplished through hand lifting, or the usage of tunnels such as the Archimedes' screw or the water wheel. Adits were used as entrances to the mine, and sources of drainage and ventilation. Stoping was a technique the Romans used to dig out of all the ore and leave behind an open space. Once the ore had been dug out trip hammers powered by water were used to crush it, and mercury was used to separate gold from surrounding materials. Following this, baskets were used to collect the ore and transport it to an area where it was processed.

=== Surface mining and strip mining ===
Surface mining was used by the ancient Romans when the rock embedded in the surface was visible. They used the technique of panning in areas where a stream had eroded the rock. Pliny wrote that this technique was useful for finding the purest form of gold. It was also useful for finding ore veins that led back to the ground or the mountains and for small mining operations. The Romans also used strip mining, whereby they would remove the exposed ore from a hill, using water to remove the soil and material.

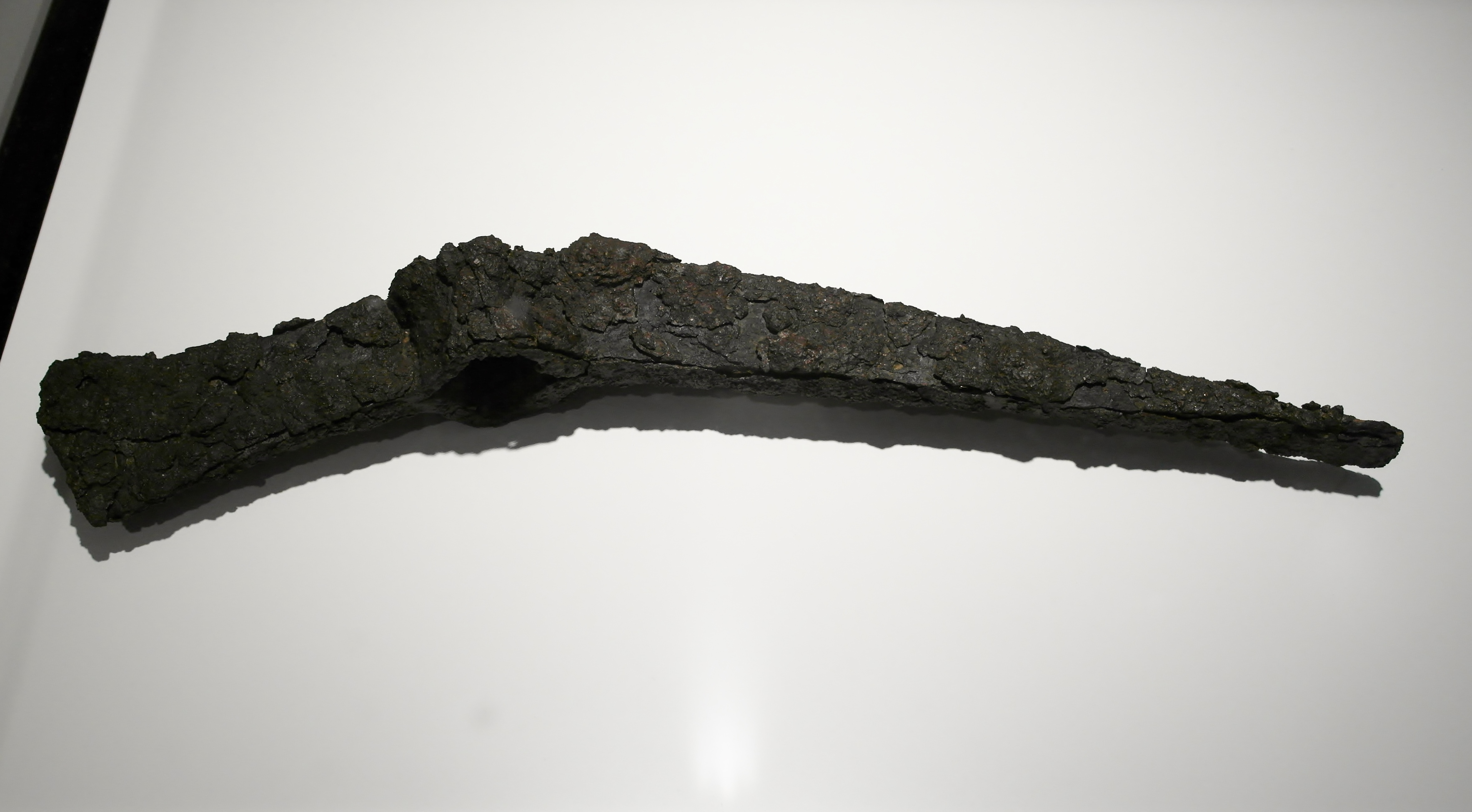
Ancient Roman dolabra

=== Tools ===
Ancient Roman miners used double-sided hammers, broad sided pickaxes, and picks that were usually made of iron. Child laborers in ancient mines possibly carried baskets that were used to transport materials. Another tool used by miners was the dolabra fossoria, which was capable of being used as a pickaxe or as a mattock. Miners also wore heavy belts to carry their tools and materials.

== Materials and usage ==
=== Lead ===
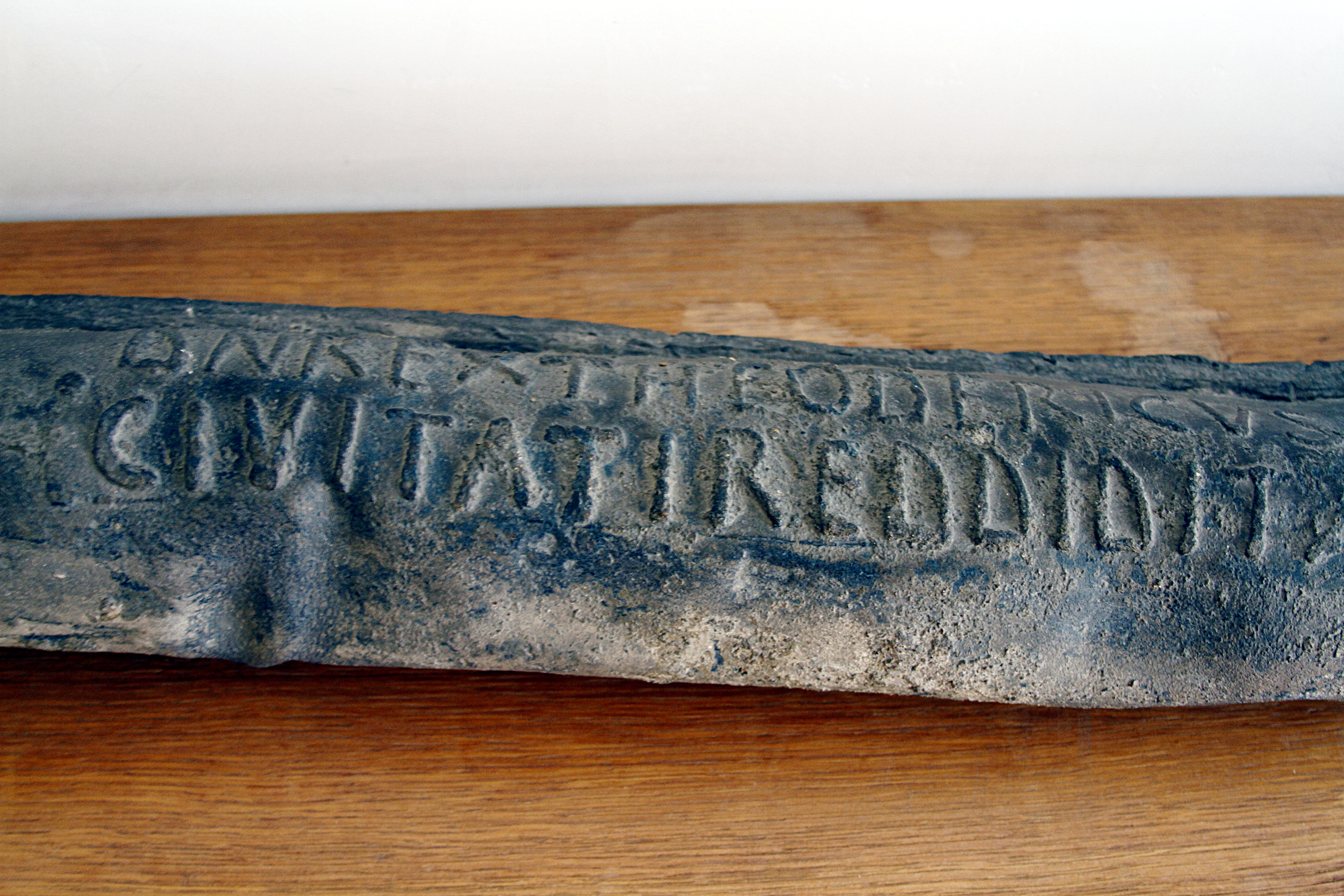
Ancient Roman lead pipe stored in the Museo Nazionale di Ravenna

Roman mines supplied the empire with its currency. The production of currency was correlated with a significantly increased amount of lead. During periods of stability and high coin production, there was a high amount of lead production. However, during periods of crisis, such as the fall of the Roman Republic there was a decreased rate of coin production, and therefore a reduced rate of lead production. Lead was also used to make water pipes and bullae. The high amounts of lead in ancient Rome led to concurrently high amounts of lead poisoning.

=== Metals and stone ===
Metals were used as a medicine for diseases such as sarcomas, rashes, and leprosy. They could also be used as a deodorant. Alumen was a liquid substance used to bind dyes to fabrics, making it one of the most popular and effective tools for painting. Roman surgeons also applied alum to wounds, since it dried tissues and caused them to draw together, allowing for easier healing. Aluminum was also mixed with water to create cement. Most stone was produced locally as it was typically expensive to transport. According to the writer Vitruvius Roman quarries produced many varieties of stone, including red and black tufa, as well as white or soft stone. The material quarries produced was used in construction.

== Types ==
=== Quarries ===
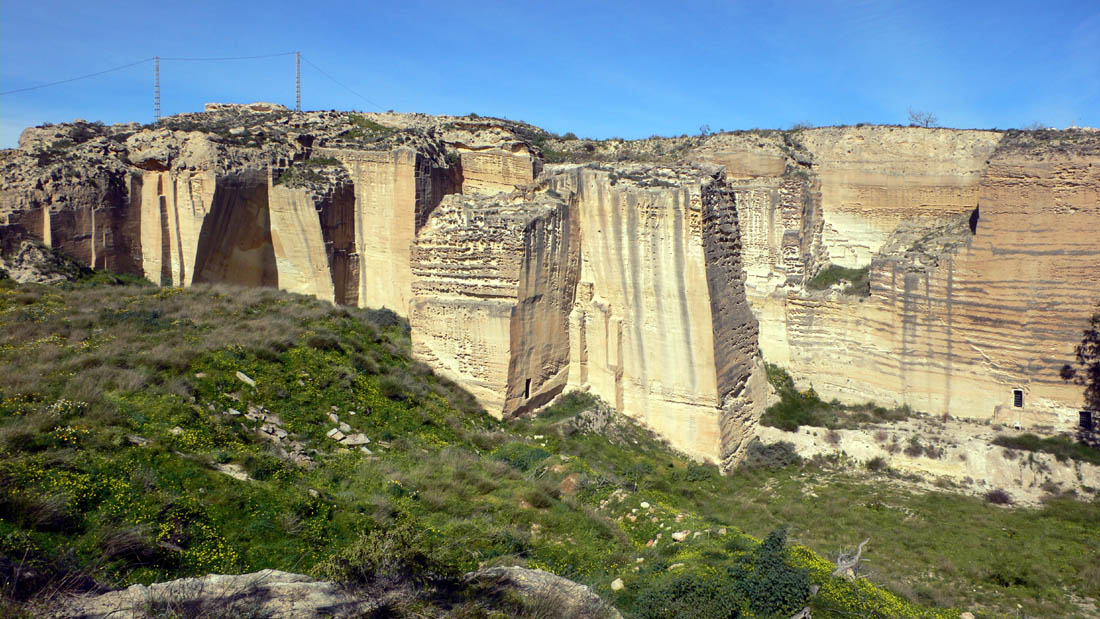
An ancient Roman quarry near the city of Carthago Nova

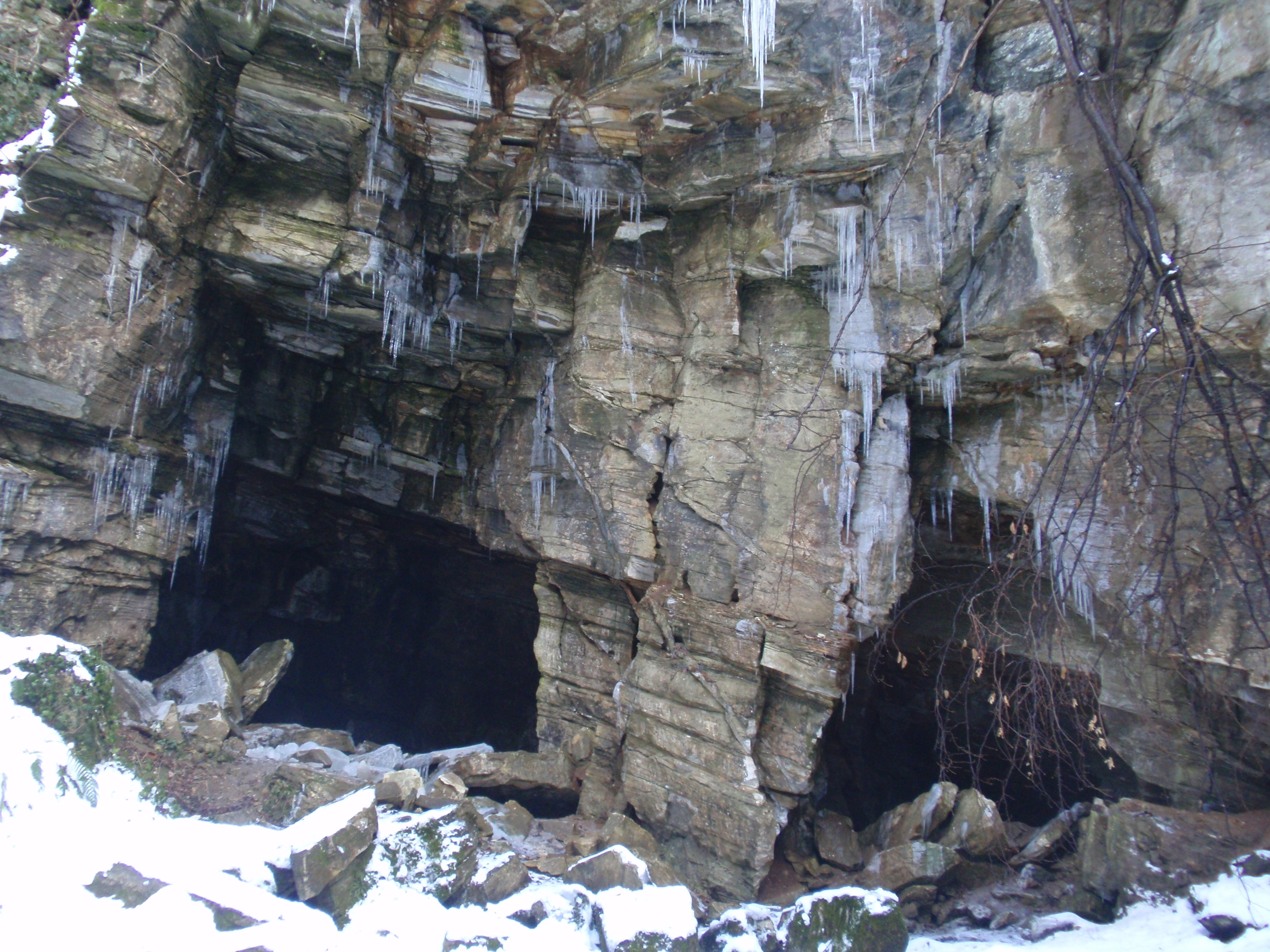
Ancient Roman open-pit mine in Slovenia

The Romans usually built quarries near the seas or rivers. Upon finding an adequate place for a quarry, the rock was withered away, usually through trial trenching. Afterwards, a line of holes would be chiseled into the rock surface, and wedges would proceed to be inserted into these holes, which were then used to pull the rock apart. The workers would proceed to shape the area with stone blocks. Ancient Roman quarries used stone cairns to supply the material necessary for slipway ramps, which were used to access the quarry and carry out the mined material. Cranes may have also been used to drag material out of quarries. Camels, donkeys, wagons, or ships may have been used as work animals to assist the miner's efforts. The workers may have slept, relaxed, and possibly lived in huts that were placed by the quarries. One quarry has a village of 16 huts, 15 of which are organized in a circle. Another quarry used an L-shaped building with many rooms, and 5 multi-room sections. This building likely served as a dining area and a social area for the workers and administrators of the quarry. Some quarries had watchtowers, which were likely used for long-distance communication or to watch over the labor of prisoners. Forts, temples, baths, and cemeteries were present in the quarry at Wadi Abu Ma'amel. In this quarry, the slipway routes ended in a flat pedestal, and chippings of black porphyry covered the loading ramp.

=== Mines ===
Mines in ancient Rome gathered unprocessed metal and would then proceed to smelt it. Metal was one of the most important materials. It was used for crafts, construction, weapons, tools, and currency. Only low-status individuals or slaves worked in ancient Roman mines due to the high amounts of danger involved in their job. The Romans had a punishment named damnatio ad metalla, which condemned slaves and criminals to work in mines. Their conditions were dangerous and miserable, usually resulting in death. Many mining slaves wished to die due to the horrible conditions in these mines. Child slaves were common in mines as they were considered useful for crawling through narrow spaces.

== Administration ==
During the Roman Empire mines and quarries were organized into districts. They were governed by the lex metallis dicta, a law that dictated the rules and regulations of the mines and the punishments for violating them. Slaves who had stolen ore were flogged and prohibited from continuing to work in the mines, freedmen had their property confiscated and lost the privilege of working in the mines. In the case of sabotage, both groups would be banned from the mines. The lex metalli vispascensis, another law governing the mines allows for the collection of fees and gives certain groups the ability to monopolize their industry. Toll stations may have been placed around mining sites to mark their borders, collect fines, and manage the traffic and trade in the mine.

== See also ==
- Mining in Roman Britain
