= Charterhouse (Roman town) =

Former Roman-British town in Somerset, England

Coordinates: 51.3023°N 2.7150°W

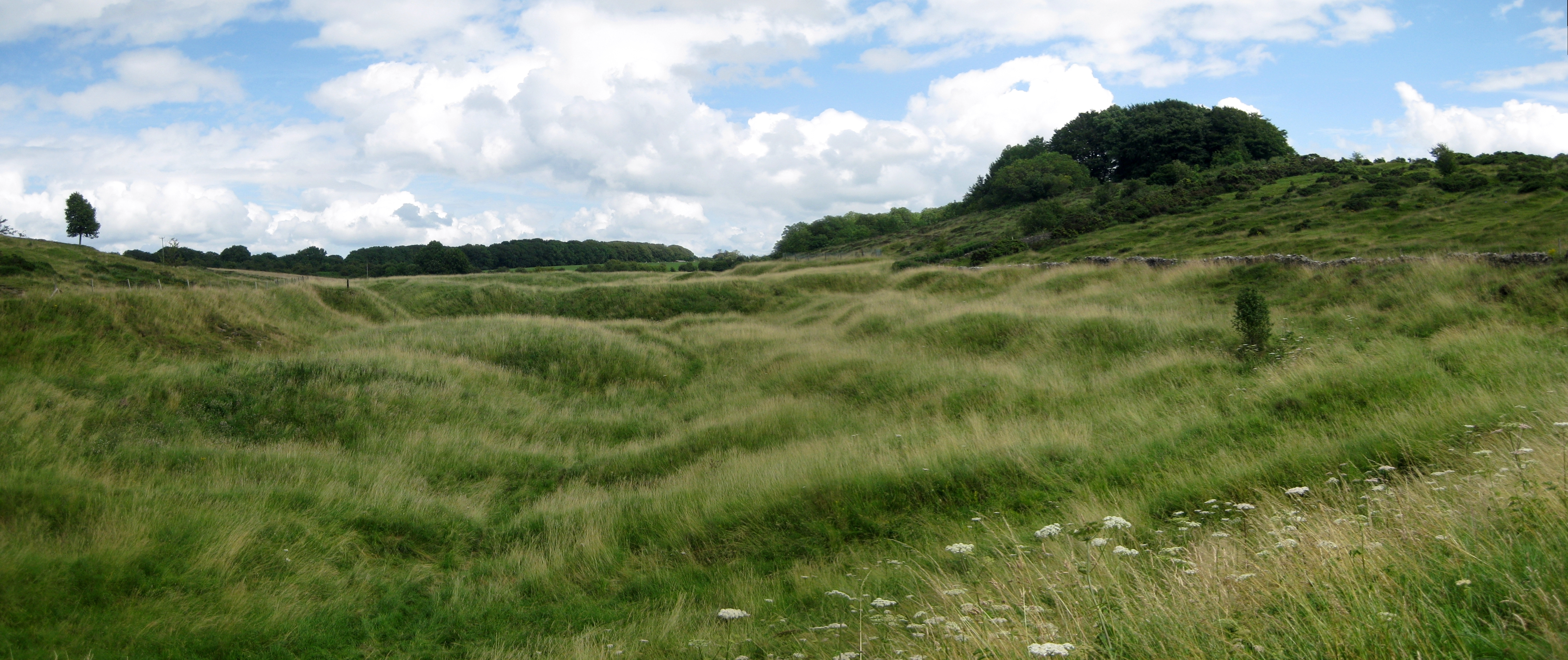
Roman lead mines at Charterhouse, Somerset.

Charterhouse is a name used for a former Roman-British town, located west of the later village of Charterhouse-on-Mendip in Somerset, England. A nearby pre-Roman Iron Age hill fort, Charterhouse Camp, is also located nearby.

The Latin name of the town in the Roman era is unknown; it may have been Iscalis, but this is far from certain. Based on inscriptions on a pig of Roman lead BRIT. EX. ARG. VEB, meaning "British (lead) from the VEB... lead-silver works", the Roman name has also been reconstructed as Vebriacum (in which case, Iscalis was more likely at the future site of Cheddar, Somerset).

The Roman landscape has been designated as a scheduled monument.

== Mining settlement ==
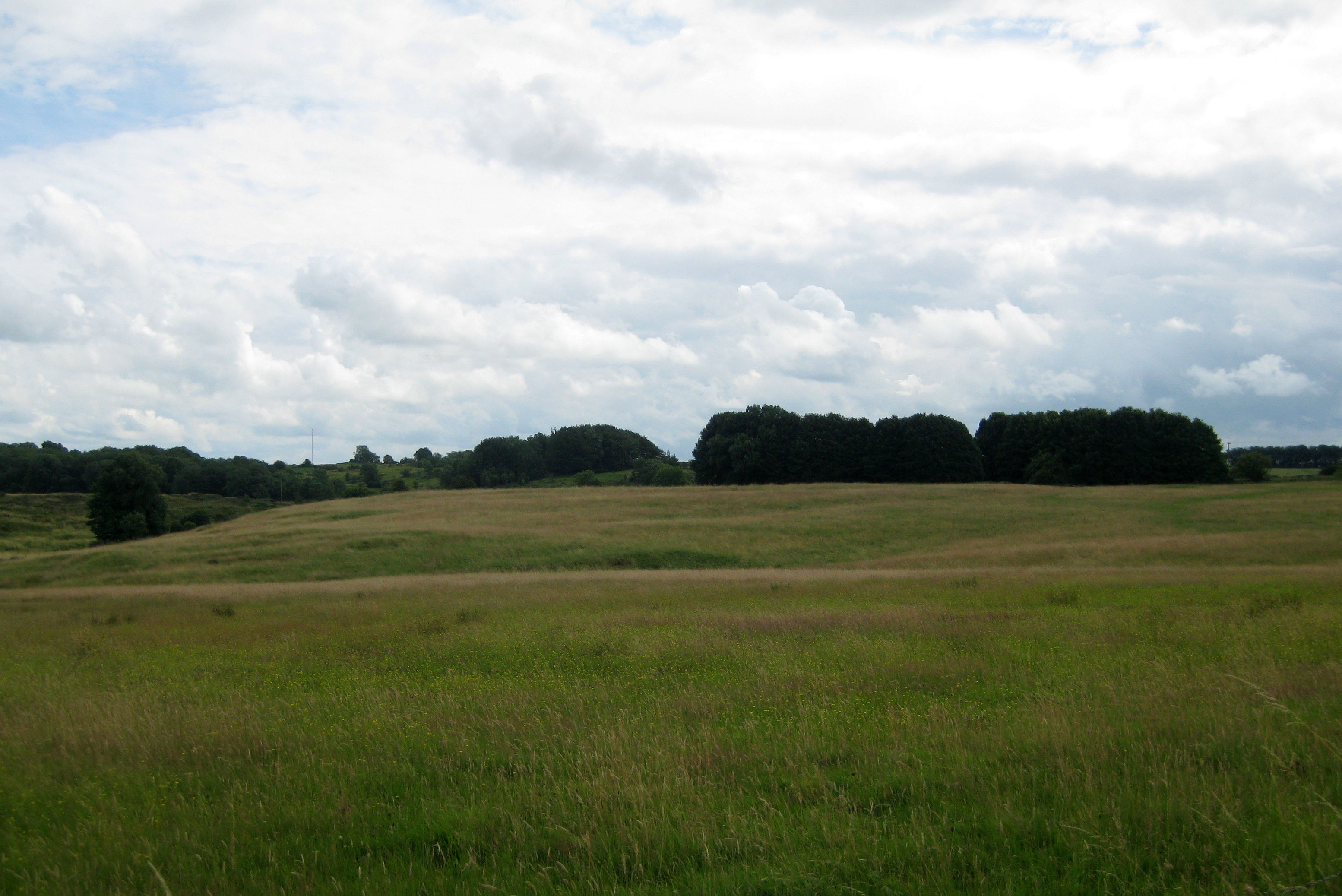
Site of Roman fort

The settlement grew up around the north-western edge of prehistoric lead and silver mines, which were exploited by the Romans. Mendip lead ore had up to 0.4% silver content, which the Romans used to pay the army. Extraction is thought to have begun as early as AD 49 (although the evidence of dateable lead ingots found in the neighbourhood has recently been questioned.) At first the lead and silver industries were tightly controlled by the Roman military (in the south-west, by the Second Legion) and there was a small 'fortlet' adjoining the mines during the 1st century, which may, however, have been little more than a fortified compound for storing lead pigs. After a short time, the extraction of these metals was contracted out to civilian companies, probably because of low silver content. Smelting was undertaken on site where industrial workshops have been excavated, and the metal exported along a minor road to the Fosse Way, and probably through a small inland port at nearby Cheddar.

== Amphitheatre ==
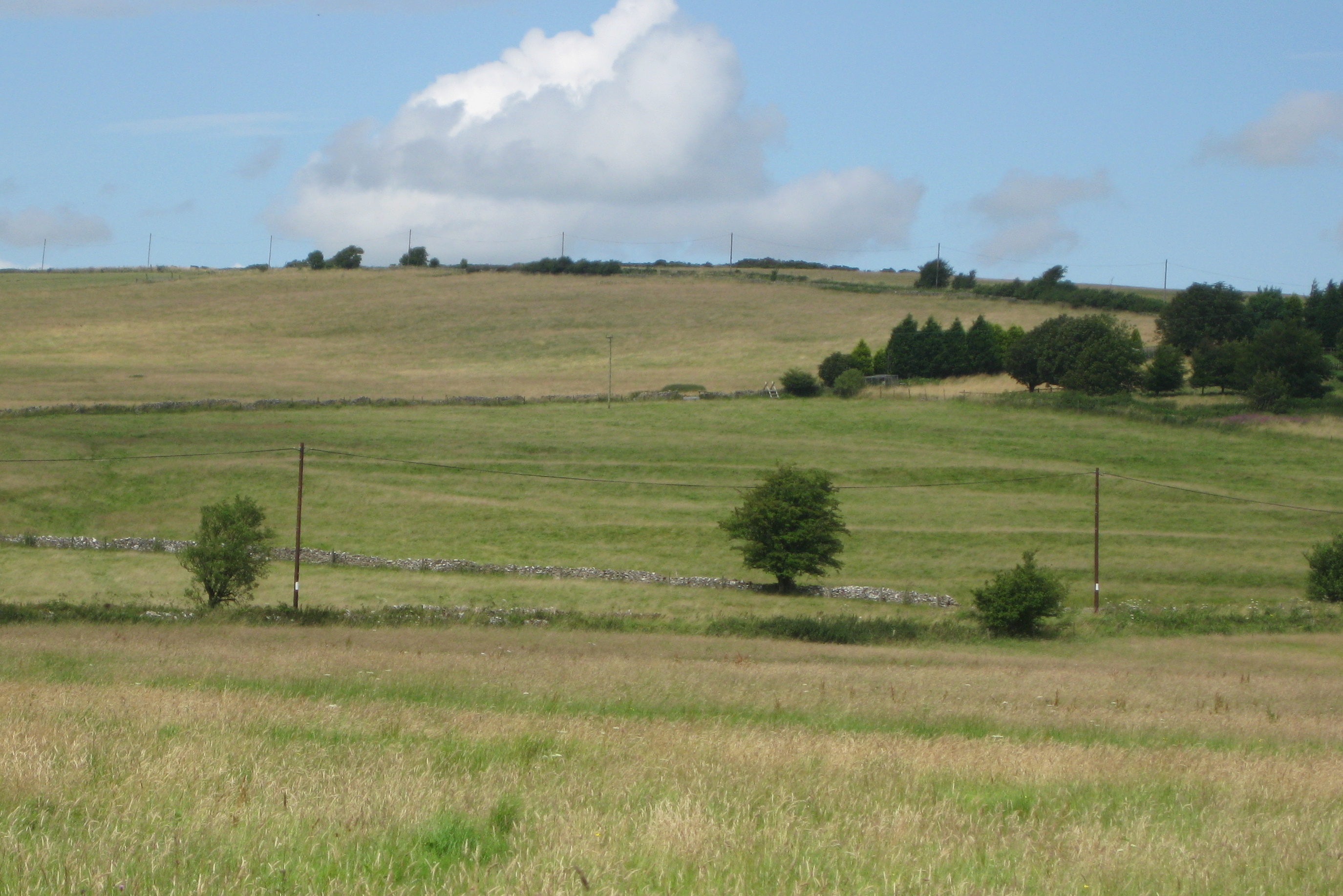
View of the ancient enclosure and site of Roman town

An amphitheatre stood west of the settlement. It is the only one in England to exist at a lead mine and is additional evidence of the importance of Mendip lead to the Romans. It measures 32 m x 24.4 m and the banks for the seating survive 4.5 m above the arena. It was surveyed in 1909. It was probably a place of entertainment for the soldiers at the Roman fort which was established here.

== See also ==
- Roman engineering
- Roman mining
- Roman technology
