= Dolaucothi Estate =

Estate in Carmarthenshire, Wales

Coordinates: 52°02′59″N 3°56′55″W

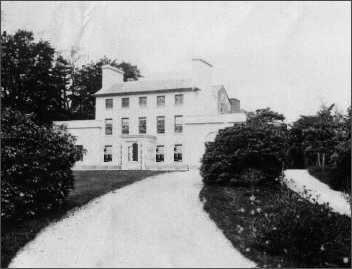
Dolaucothi House pre-1871, as designed by John Nash.

The Dolaucothi Estate (also Dolaucothy) is situated about 1 mile (1.6 km) north-west of the village of Caio up the Cothi Valley in the community of Cynwyl Gaeo, in Carmarthenshire, Wales. Dolaucothi means ‘the meadows of the Cothi’.

The medieval manor house overlooking the fast-flowing River Cothi was rebuilt by the Johnes family and, in 1873, the estate encompassed 3,172 acres (1,284 ha). The park is registered at Grade II on the Cadw/ICOMOS Register of Parks and Gardens of Special Historic Interest in Wales. The house was demolished in 1952.

Dolaucothi House could be approached by two drives of considerable length, that to the east skirting the Roman gold mines (Ogofau, near Pumsaint), while that to the west was flanked by four lines of ancient oaks — the "very noble oaks" remarked upon by George Borrow (1803–1881) after walking along the avenue in 1854 for a glimpse of the house, charmed by the thought that "he had never seen a more pleasing locality".

== Johnes family ==
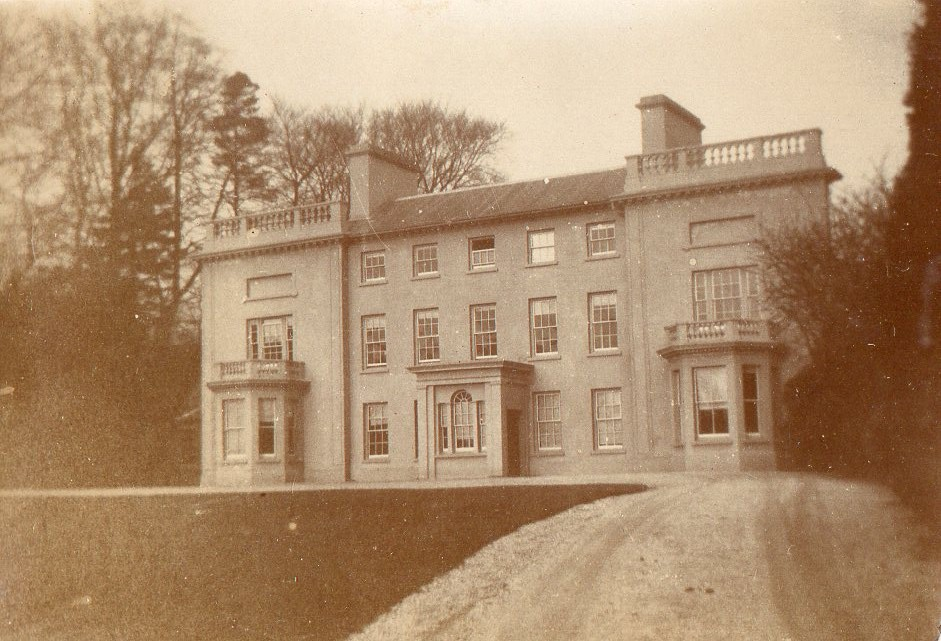
Dolaucothi in the late-Victorian period.

Dolaucothi devolved upon the Johnes family in the late 16th century through the marriage of James Johnes, Sheriff of Cardiganshire (1586) to Anne (1565–1600), widow of James Lewis, of Llanbadarn Fawr; she was heiress to John ap Thomas, of Cryngae and Dolaucothi, brother of Sir Rhys ap Thomas, KG.

James Johnes was the youngest son of Sir Thomas Johnes, MP (1492–1559), of Abermarlais, Carmarthenshire and inherited the Haroldston estate, Pembrokeshire through his wife, Dame Mary, widow of Sir Thomas Perrott, daughter and heiress of the Hon Sir James Berkeley. Sir Thomas Johnes was returned to Parliament as first Knight of the Shire, before being appointed in 1541 Sheriff of Carmarthenshire and of Cardiganshire in 1544.

John Johnes (1768–1815), a former army captain, purchased the estate in 1800 from his cousin and brother-in-law, Colonel Thomas Johnes, FRS, MP (1748–1816), owner of the great Hafod Estate and Lord Lieutenant of Cardiganshire.

== Architecture ==
Dolaucothi House was rebuilt in the early 18th century with a five-bay, three-storey façade. Retaining some original features, in 1679, it had 6 hearths; described as ‘simple and dignified’, the house was rebuilt in cube-formation with 28 rooms. John Nash (1752–1835) was employed in 1792 to add the porch and two low wings, each with a window in a recessed arch. At that time, Nash had just finished working on the famous octagonal domed-library and square pavilions at Hafod for Colonel Thomas Johnes.

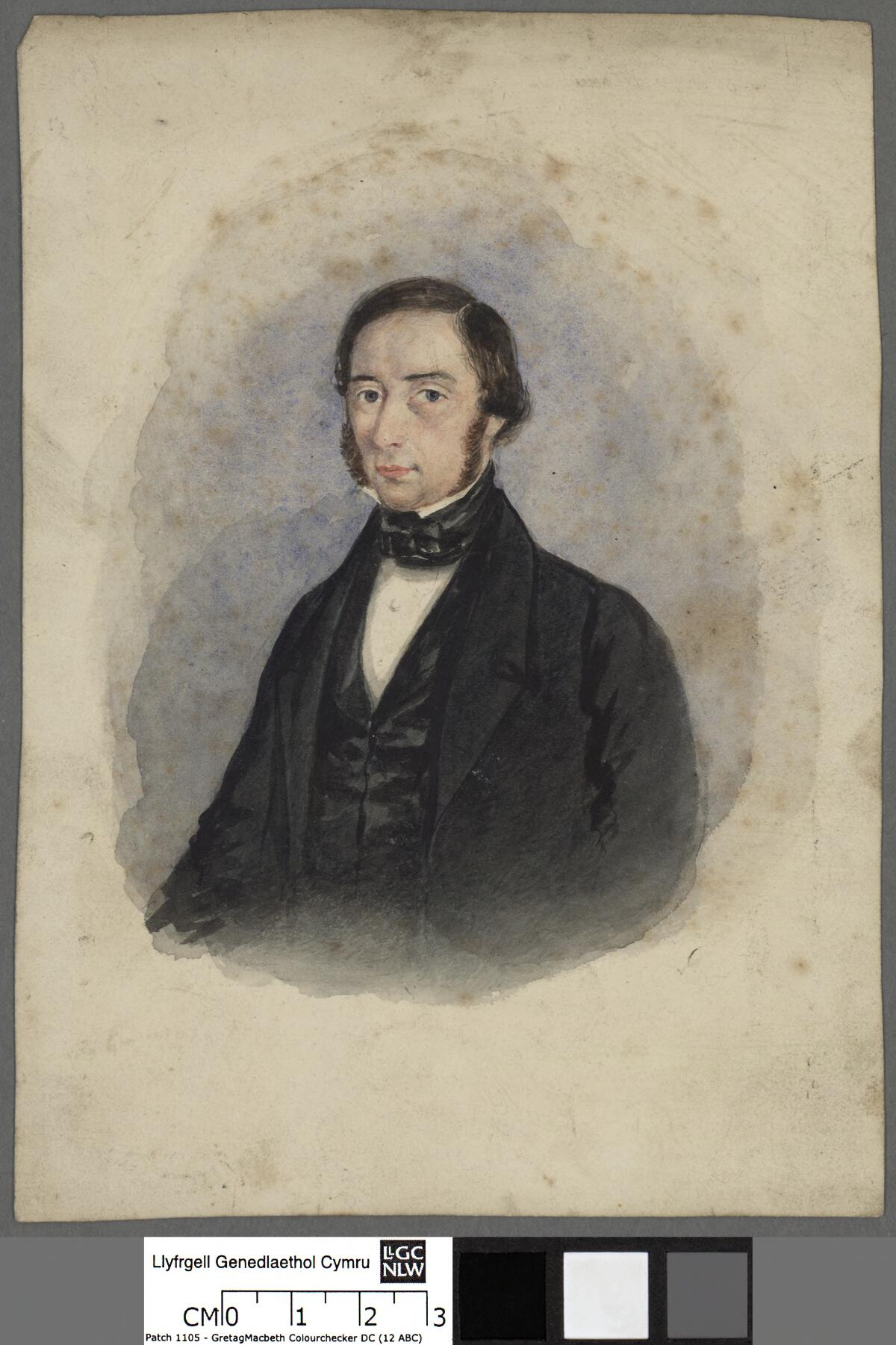
His Hon. Judge John Johnes, JP, DL

Captain John Johnes' son, also named John (1800–1876), became a judge, who commissioned various refurbishments, including having the wings raised adding bay windows in 1871. In its heyday Dolaucothi retained a domestic staff of nine with eighteen more working on the estate. Dolaucothi is noted as having interiors of much charm, displaying many portraits as well as the Eastern war trophies of the celebrated General Hills, VC.

== Murder of Judge John Johnes ==
Judge Johnes was educated at Oxford before being called to the Bar. He was a good businessman and soon had put the whole estate on a sound financial basis. In 1822 he married Elizabeth Edwardes, daughter and heiress of the Revd John Edwardes (1765–1847), of Gileston in Glamorganshire, a younger branch of the family of Edwardes, of Rhyd-y-gors. They had two daughters, Charlotte Anne Maria (1825–1911) and Elizabeth (1834–1927). Judge Johnes became a widower when his wife died on 25 June 1848.

Charlotte married Captain Charles Caesar Cookman, eldest son of Edward Rogers Cookman, Esq. of Monart House, County Wexford, but Captain Cookman died on 4 June 1859 leaving her a widow.

In the autumn of 1864, John Johnes was briefly mentioned as a potential parliamentary candidate for Carmarthen Boroughs following the death of David Morris. However, William Morris, JP, a cousin of the late member was elected unopposed.

In the summer of 1876, Dolaucothi made national news when Judge John Johnes was murdered in his library on 19 August by Henry Tremble, his Irish butler of 17 years' service, "who killed him with his master's shotgun". Tremble also severely wounded Mrs Charlotte Cookman. Tremble was most upset that the judge had refused his application for the tenancy of the Dolaucothi Arms, a local public house, previously promised to him. Judge Johnes' reasons for turning down his application to become landlord concerned Tremble's wife's disposition for drinking excessively.

Tremble then headed into the village of Caio with the intention of murdering John Davies, the inn-keeper he felt had deprived him of the position he sought. Davies was away in Carmarthen that day so, after threatening a local police constable, he returned home to ‘Myrtle Cottage’ where he shot himself.

Henry Tremble, 36, entered domestic service at Dolaucothi upon the death of Captain Cookman in 1859. Tremble (whose collateral descendants include the Northern Ireland politician David Trimble) had been his valet in Ireland, and he had accompanied him to Wales upon his marriage to Charlotte. At Dolaucothi he worked his way up to the position of butler but was known to possess a somewhat violent disposition. John Johnes would have dismissed him on several occasions previously had he not been dissuaded from doing so by Charlotte, who felt that this would betray the memory of her late husband who had commended the care of his favourite servant to her.

On 26 August 1876 Judge Johnes' remains were interred in the family vault at Saint Cynwyl's, where Canon Phillips, subsequently Dean of St. David's, and the Revd Charles Chidlow, vicar of Caio, officiated. Charlotte resumed the name of Johnes under her father's Will of 1876 and lived out her days at Dolaucothi, inherited jointly with her sister, Lady Hills-Johnes.

== Sir James Hills-Johnes ==
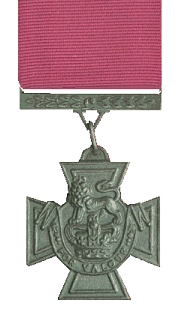

Lieutenant-General Sir James Hills (1833–1919), Victoria Cross recipient, hero of the Indian Mutiny and former Military Governor of Kabul married the younger sister and co-heiress, Elizabeth Johnes, in 1882.

Accordingly, Sir James assumed, by Royal Licence, the additional surname and coat of arms of Johnes, becoming Lieutenant-General Sir James Hills-Johnes, VC, GCB. He then took over the running of the Dolaucothi estate and played an important part in Welsh life, becoming honorary colonel of the 4th Battalion of the Welch Regiment, JP and DL, and later High Sheriff of Carmarthenshire in 1886. Granted the honorary freedom of Carmarthen in 1910, General Hills-Johnes also served as treasurer of University College Wales (1898–1919), receiving the honorary degree of LL.D. in 1917.

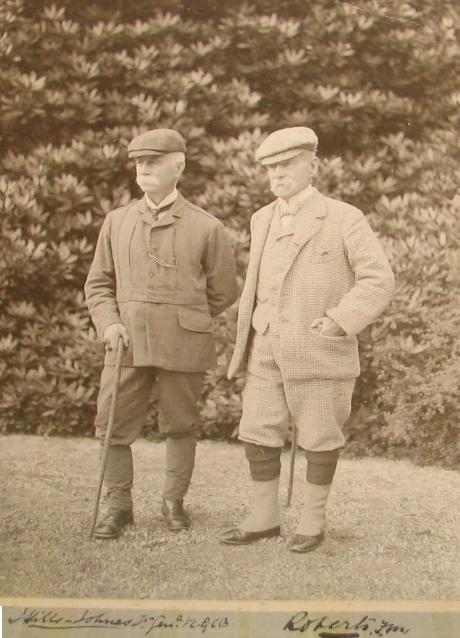
Sir James Hills-Johnes with fellow VC, the Earl Roberts, at Dolaucothy in Edwardian times.

Lady Hills-Johnes had in her early days been a ward of Lady Llanover moving in fashionable and literary circles, her "life on one occasion" being saved by the great Lord Lytton. Her correspondence with the famous Bishop of St Davids, Dr Connop Thirlwall, was published in 1881 under the title ‘Letters to a Friend’. Dolaucothi House was always full of guests, among them many distinguished men and women, not least Field Marshal the Earl Roberts (1832–1914) and Sir Henry Morton Stanley (1841–1904), explorer of Africa.

Lord Roberts and Sir James began their lifelong friendship as cadets at Addiscombe Military Seminary. Roberts joined the Bengal Horse Artillery in 1851, and Sir James, 11 months his junior, was commissioned into the same corps in 1853. Both experienced the dangers and perils of the Indian Mutiny, were present at the Siege of Delhi and took part in the operations at the Relief of Lucknow. Both were dangerously wounded at the Siege of Delhi and before the Mutiny ended, they both were awarded the Victoria Cross. A decade later they served together again in the Abyssinian and Kabul campaigns and in 1881 the pair received thanks from both Houses of Parliament.

Charlotte Johnes died in 1911, Sir James in 1919 and Lady Johnes-Hill at the grand age of 95 in 1927. Upon their deaths the Dolaucothi estate passed through a female line to the Lloyds who then added the additional surname of Johnes. The house was requisitioned by the Ministry of Supply during World War II when it fell into serious disrepair with floors collapsing and lead being removed from the roof.

Dolaucothi was presented to the National Trust in 1941 subject to the life interest of its last owner, Major Herbert Lloyd-Johnes following whose death, in 1956, the property and lordship of the manor became wholly owned by the National Trust. Major Lloyd-Johnes' daughter and heiress, Elizabeth, is married to Geoffrey Stevens, kinsman of the Dukes of Newcastle, then Earls of Lincoln.

The only remnant of the mansion, demolished in 1952, is a former service block, now an estate farmhouse.

== St Cynwyl's Church ==
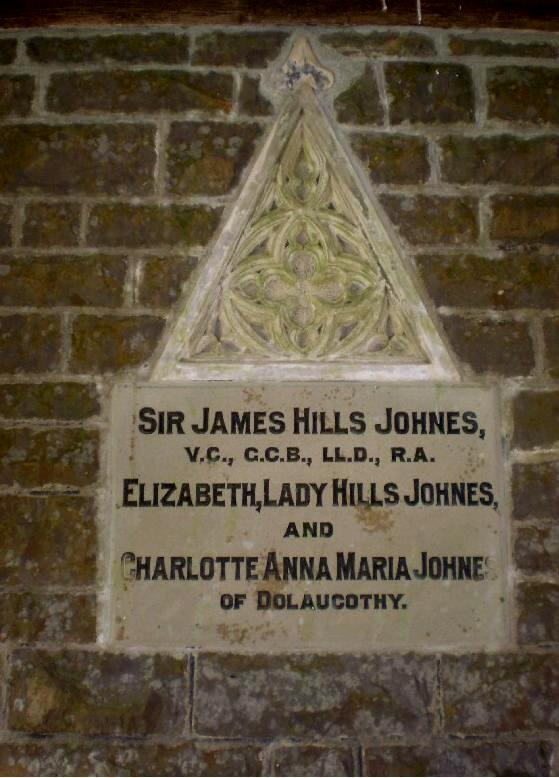
General Hills-Johnes' memorial at St Cynwyl's.

The Church of Saint Cynwyl, in Caio village centre, is surrounded by the former lands of the substantial Dolaucothi estate, where the Johnes family, patrons of the advowson, worshipped. The family vault in the north aisle dates back to the 18th century. There is also a memorial to Lieutenant-General Sir James Hills-Johnes, VC, at St Cynwyl's Lychgate.

== Ogofau gold mine ==
The Roman gold mines at Dolaucothi, later known as the Ogofau Gold Mine also belonged to this large estate. Attempts to extract further gold from the mines were undertaken in 1797 for John Johnes and again in the 1850s and in 1871 for his son Judge John Johnes when crushing machinery became available. Larger efforts to extract gold were undertaken from 1888 to 1892 by the South Wales Gold Mining Co, in 1905–1910, and in 1933–38, when Britain's abandonment of the gold standard led to a much greater interest in native gold. Later attempts to extract gold in commercially viable quantities have been unsuccessful, although interest naturally remains in the area's deposits.

== See also ==
- Colonel Thomas Johnes
- Destruction of country houses in 20th-century Britain

== Sources ==
- Lloyd-Johnes, Herbert (1959). "John Johnes" (PDF). Ceredigion. 3 (1): 1–10.
