= Eteson =

Eteson is a surname. Notable people with the surname include:

- Alfred Eteson (1832–1910), British physician in India
- Hannah Eteson (d. 1895), English librarian
