= Rhyd-y-gors =

Welsh estate, bronze age and Roman site

Coordinates: 51.847288°N 4.318808°W

The name Rhyd-y-gors or Rhydygors has been associated with two historic sites near the market town of Carmarthen in Southwest Wales. The first was the Norman Rhyd-y-gors Castle and the other was Rhyd-y-gors Mansion, home of the Edwardes family.

== History of Rhyd-y-gors ==
A perfectly preserved Bronze Age coating from an ancient British shield was found in the marsh at Rhyd-y-gors. The shield would originally have been made of wicker, with the decorative bronze plating attached to the front. This shield is slightly more than two feet in diameter and is decorated with concentric circles and many small brass knobs. It became part of the extensive collection of arms and armour acquired by Samuel Rush Meyrick 1783–1848, known as the Meyrick Collection. Following Meyricks' death, the collection was dispersed, and the shield is now displayed in the British Museum.

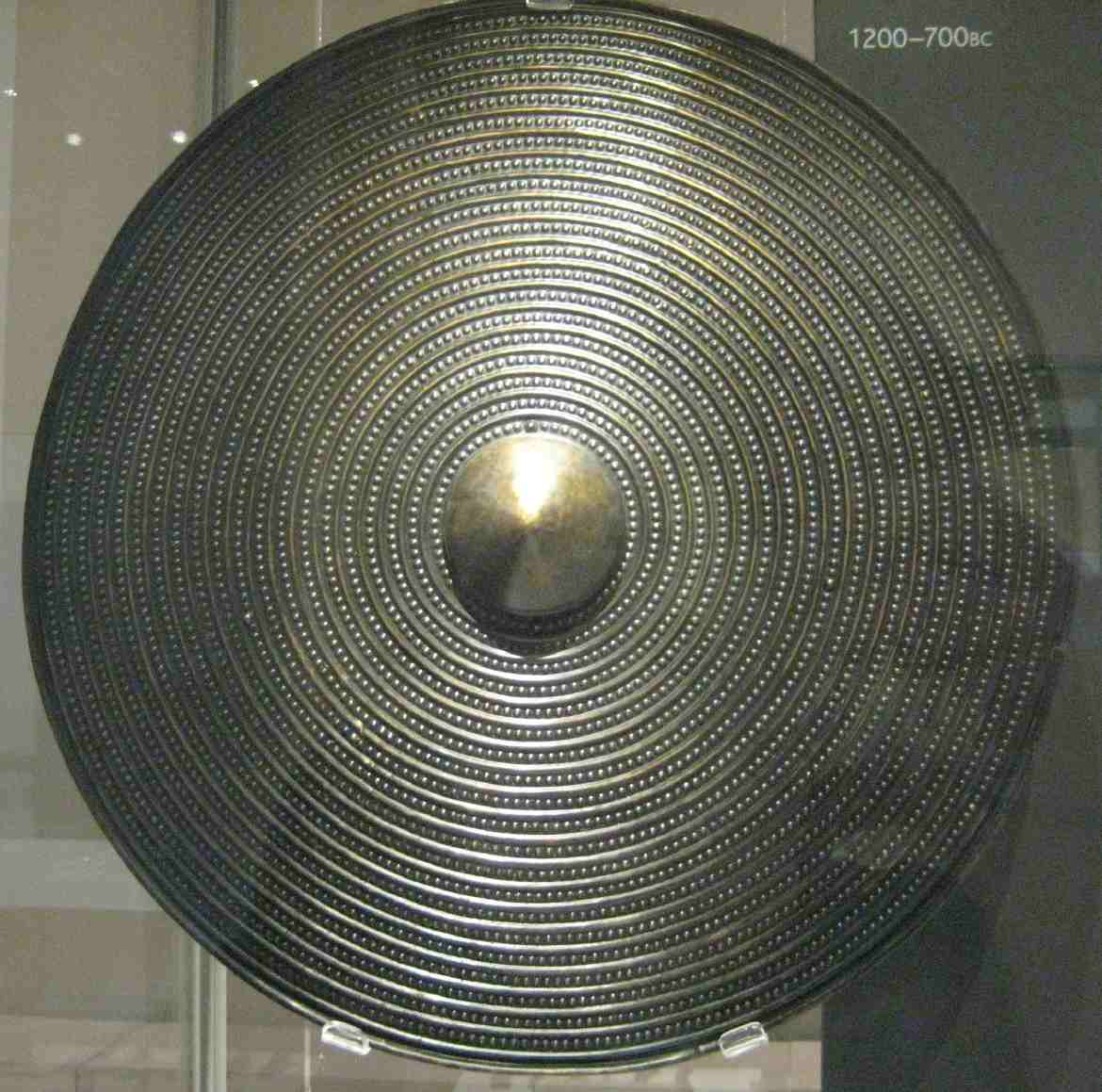
Prehistoric bronze shield found in the marsh at Rhyd-y-gors on display at the British Museum. Formerly part of the Meyrick Collection.

In AD 75, a Roman fort was established at Carmarthen, it evolved into the Roman settlement of Moridunum. It was the tribal capital of the Demetae, the Celtic tribe that inhabited the area. Various archaeological artefacts have been uncovered locally, and can be seen in the County Museum.

Rhyd-y-gors Castle was constructed on the order of King William II 1087–1100, known as Rufus, by the Norman invader William Fitz Baldwin, Sheriff of Devon, in the late 11th century (1093–1094). It was situated on a bluff overlooking the River Towy, about one mile South of Carmarthen. The castle was located on the East bank of the Towy, at a place where there was an ancient ford in the river. The word Rhyd-y-gors in Welsh means "Ford of the Marsh". The castle is thought to have been a timber structure surrounded by earthworks, but all trace of it is now gone.

At his untimely death in 1099, King Llywelyn ap Cadwgan was an under-King of William II. Llywelyn issued the only known coins of a Welsh ruler. At King William's mint at Rhyd-y-gors, he struck coins bearing the legend, 'Llywelyn ap Cadwgan, Rex'.

Rhyd-y-gors Castle was an important centre for the Norman invasion and subsequent control of Southwest Wales. William Fitz Baldwin held the castle until his death in 1096, at which point it was abandoned. William's brother Richard re-established the castle in 1106, and it remained an important focal point until Henry I 1068–1135 built the more permanent Carmarthen Castle by 1109. It seems Rhyd-y-gors Castle had outlived its purpose and slowly crumbled. In the late 19th century, the line of the Great Western Railway was constructed through the site, and any remains were obliterated.

== Rhyd-y-gors Mansion ==
The second use of the name Rhyd-y-gors refers to the now demolished Gentry house, Rhyd-y-gors Mansion, located on the opposite side of the river to the site of the castle. The house was positioned near a bend, above the bank of the Towy, near the ancient crossing that Rhyd-y-gors derives its name from. The first family to have inhabited the site were named Winter, and are believed to have arrived during the reign of William II, and were part of the train of forces headquartered at Carmarthen Castle.

== Progression of ownership ==
As the medieval period drew to an end, a new house was built at the site and passed to a Welshman, Meredith Lewis Meredith, upon his marriage to Joan, daughter and heiress of Morgan Winter. Meredith and Joan lived at Rhyd-y-gors and bore an only daughter, Mary, who married John ap Ieuan before 1500. The eldest son of this union was Edward ap John. As was becoming common in Tudor times, Edward ap John adopted his Christian name as their patronymic, and their surname became Edwards or Edwardes. Edward ap John bore a son David Edwardes, who became an Alderman of Carmarthen, Town Bailiff in 1570, and Mayor in 1606.

During the period 1779 – 1785, Admiral David Edwardes Esq, of Rhyd-y-gors, let the house to the Carmarthen Presbyterian College, under the rule of Revd. Robert Gentleman, who had 28 pupils in his care.

Following the death of Captain David John Browne Edwardes (30th Regiment) in 1876, his wife Elizabeth Caroline (Betha) Edwardes Nee Warlow 1833–1931, (great niece of Sir Thomas Picton), and their children David John William (Willie) Edwardes 1864–1936 and John Picton Arthur (Picton) Edwardes 1865–1937 moved to another property they owned, St Regulus, near Southampton, in Hampshire, and Rhyd-y-gors was tenanted once again.

In October 1878, the Court of Quarter Sessions ordered that the Committee of Lunacy be authorised to rent Rhyd-y-gors Mansion for three years at a rent not exceeding £100 and rates and taxes. In 1890, Lord Emlyn gave notice that he would ask the Court's sanction to be given to the Joint Counties Lunatic Asylum for taking Rhyd-y-gors for 21 years, at £100 per annum.

In 1911, Rhyd-y-gors was finally sold. This was the first time the estate had changed ownership, other than by inheritance, in recorded history. The house was occupied by various tenants, including housing Belgian refugees during World War I. It was then occupied until about 1960, after which it became ruinous and was finally demolished in 1971 by the commercial firm who owned the estate, and had built a creamery on the front portion of the land. In 2003, all that remained was a large stone wall, which originally encircled the garden, and a stone cottage, which would have acted as a gatehouse to the main residence.

The creamery has since been demolished, and part of the grounds of the estate are now covered by Amex Park, a 4.45-hectare (11.0-acre) commercial business park, accessed from Llansteffan Road, Johnstown. The name lives on with the Rhyd-y-gors Special School and Rhyd-y-gors House, in Amex Park.

== Architecture and construction of Rhyd-y-gors ==
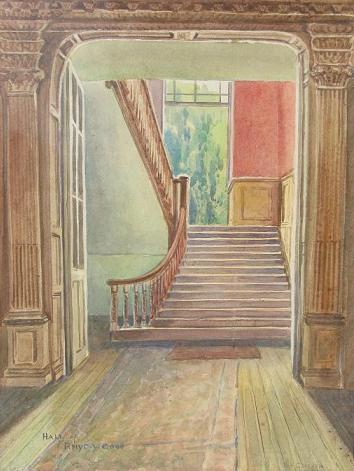
Painting of the Hall of Rhyd-y-gors, 1913

Rhyd-y-gors Mansion was a tall imposing house of roughcast stone, coloured red. The house was of three storeys, each with a range of five windows, and an attic storey with three dormer windows in the roof. On each gable end were massive chimneys. A South wing was added in the 17th century.

The plain façade gave little hint of the excellent carpentry within. The large panelled hall, wide stairs and a huge doorcase (Pictured at right), similar to the entrance door of the Great House at Laugharne, were of excellent quality. Some inventive 19th century work had been undertaken, particularly an archway of beehive outline and gothic door, both with a hint of India.

Two stone gargoyles from the site are located in the Carmarthen Museum, at Abergwili.

== The Edwardes Family of Rhyd-y-gors ==
The Edwardes family has produced numerous notable contributors to Carmarthenshire history and have held high office in both town and county, including Mayors on four occasions, Town Sheriffs on six occasions and once in 1754, High Sheriff of the county. They have also consistently contributed officers to the British army, and on occasion to the Royal Navy. The Edwardes family held the tradition for many generations of naming their first-born son David, this tradition causes certain confusion when tracing the family genealogy.

David Edwardes Esq, was mayor in 1651, Town Sheriff in 1640 and died 1664. His brother Thomas Edwardes, a scholar, became Senior Fellow of Queens' College, Cambridge and left property to his college in his will, proved in 1684. The previous David Edwardes' son, also David Edwardes, was Borough Sheriff in 1680 and is credited with bringing order and system to Welsh genealogy, and was largely responsible for the manuscripts known as the Golden Grove Books. He was a noted Actuary, and in 1684 was appointed Deputy Herald of Clarenceux King-of-Arms, and he compiled a large collection of pedigrees and coats-of-arms, many of which are still preserved in the College of Arms. He died in 1690, and left realty in Trelach and Llanwinio to his uncle's Cambridge college. Rhyd-y-gors passed to his cousin Captain John Edwardes (See portrait in Gallery at end of article), who was the grandfather of Admiral David Edwardes RN 1716–1785.

In 1754, Admiral David Edwardes RN, held the office of High Sheriff of Carmarthenshire. Admiral Edwardes and his wife Anne (See portrait in Gallery at end of article), are interred in Cowbridge Church, Glamorgan, and a plaque also commemorates them in St Mary's church, Llanllwch. Admiral Edwardes' youngest son, the Revd. John Edwardes (1765–1847), married Margaret Willis of Gileston Manor, near Cowbridge, and by inheritance, Revd. Edwardes inherited Gileston Manor from his wife's father, the Revd. William Willis A.M. The Revd. John Edwardes had a daughter Elizabeth, who married Judge John Johnes 1800–1876, of the Dolaucothi Estate, Carmarthenshire. Judge Johnes was notoriously murdered at Dolaucothy, by his butler, on 19 August 1876, using his master's shotgun. Judge Johnes' younger daughter Elizabeth married Lieutenant General Sir James Hills-Johnes V.C. G.C.B.

Another Captain David John Edwardes (Royal Horse Artillery) 14 Oct 1787-14 Apr 1866, grandson of Admiral Edwardes, served in the Peninsula War and was present at the Battle of Waterloo. He is credited with nearly capturing Joseph Bonaparte, brother of Napoleon, after the Battle of Vittoria. Joseph escaped, but Captain Edwardes souvenired a set of razors, a carriage clock and some other personal items from his carriage, which are still held by descendants of the family. Captain David Edwardes served in the Royal Horse Artillery with Captain Henry Forster (1789–1855) of Southend, Kent.

Following their return to England after the Battle of Waterloo, David Edwardes married Henrys' sister Caroline Forster. Henry Forster went on to marry Elizabeth Fitzgibbon and his grandson become Henry William Forster (First and Last Baron Forster, Governor-General of Australia). Captain Edwardes took an active interest in local politics and formally nominated the Conservative candidate, David Lewis, who contested Carmarthen Boroughs at the General Election of 1835. Lewis won the seat at the expense of the sitting Whig Member, William Henry Yelverton, but lost his seat two years later.

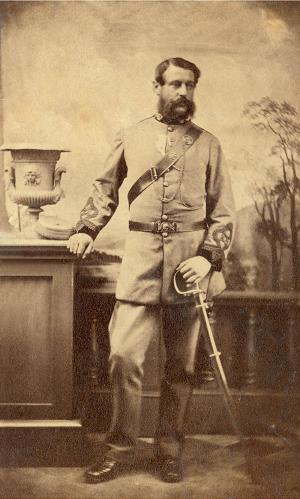
Captain Frederick Augustus Edwardes (30 Regiment) 1829–1878 Photo courtesy of Blaise Shann

Captain David John Edwardes had a brother, Captain Henry Lewis Edwardes J.P. (62nd Regiment) 3 Nov 1788-5 Aug 1866, who also served in the Napoleonic wars, but is mainly credited as the person who brought home from India, the recipe for the condiment which became known as Worcester Sauce, this is a fact in dispute though, as the introduction of Worcester Sauce is also credited to Lord Marcus Sandys. Captain Henry Lewis Edwardes changed his name to Henry Lewis Edwardes Gwynne in 1805, upon being left the Glanlery estate by his godfather, an heirless bachelor, Lewis Gwynne of Monachty, Cardigan. Captain Henry Lewis Edwardes Gwynne went on to become High Sheriff of Cardigan in 1832. He is occasionally referred to as Edward Gwynne in some texts, due to confusion over his name change. In 1849, he was appointed Deputy Lieutenant of Carmarthen. and he died on 3 August 1866, aged 78 years, and was interred in the family vault at Llanllwch.

Captain Frederick Augustus Edwardes (30th Regiment) 1829–1878, pictured at left, was the youngest son of Captain David John Edwardes 1787–1866, and he married Charlotte Maria Philipps 1834–1924, of Cwmgwili, Abergwili. Upon retirement from the army, he farmed an estate at Ffrwd, near Wrexham, inherited from Charlotte Maria Picton (née Edwardes) 1755–1840, sister-in-law of Lieutenant-General Sir Thomas Picton. He later separated from his wife, and attempted to make his fortune in the United States. It is unclear what he did there, but he returned to Wales on 23 January 1878 and died of peritonitis at Fishguard, soon after disembarking the ship, and before he had the opportunity to see his wife. His wife Charlotte lived out her later life (1907–1923) at No.1, The Queens House, Wimbledon, accommodation provided by her long-time friend Queen Alexandra, wife of King Edward VII.

Frederick Augustus Edwardes' daughter Blanche Frances Edwardes (1858–1948) married Charles Vandeleur Creagh CMG (1842–1917), Governor of North Borneo and Labuan, in June 1882. Charles Vandeleur Creagh was the brother of General O'Moore Creagh VC GCB GCSI (1848–1923). Their elder son became Rear-Admiral James Vandeleur Creagh DSO (1883–1956). Their younger son went on to become Second Lieutenant O'Moore Charles Creagh (1896–1918) of the Royal Field Artillery, who was killed in action during the German spring offensive at Feuillaucourt, near Mont Saint-Quentin, on 23 March 1918, aged 21.

Captain David John Browne Edwardes 1819–1876, was Chief Constable of the Carmarthen Borough Police in 1870–1875. His sons were the final Edwardes of the male line, David John William (Willie) Edwardes 1864–1936 and John Picton Arthur (Picton) Edwardes 1865–1937, who lived at their home, St Regulus, near Southampton, following their move from Rhyd-y-gors in 1876. It was they who sold Rhyd-y-gors in 1911. Willie Edwardes was a big-game hunter and sportsman, and died at Luxor, Egypt. His brother Picton was a successful merchant banker, and died at St Regulus. Both were bachelors who died without issue, and left their estate to their cousin, Gladys Hemery Beckett (nee Lindon), wife of Captain W.N.T. Beckett R.N. 1893–1941. They also left £200,000 to charity.

== St Mary’s Church, Llanllwch ==
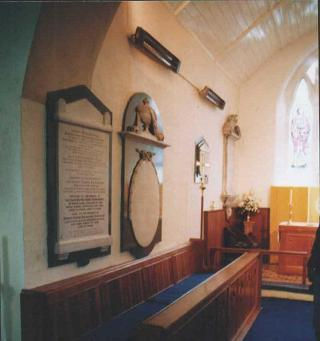
Edwardes Monuments, St Marys Church, Llanllwch.

St Mary's church in Llanllwch was the place of worship of the Anglican Edwardes family, and various members of the family are commemorated there on two marble memorials dating from 1786 to 1866. The older memorial was erected by Charlotte Maria Picton, who was a daughter of Admiral David Edwardes. She was married to Revd. Edward Picton 1760–1835, the brother and heir of Lieutenant-General Sir Thomas Picton GCB 1758–1815, who fell at the Battle of Waterloo.

The two memorials (Pictured at right) are attached to the wall behind the family's front pew in the church. A number of the family are interred in the family vault, which lies beneath the floor under the pew. Captain David John Edwardes 1787–1866 and his son Captain Frederick Augustus Edwardes 1829–1878 are buried in the churchyard behind the church.

== Arms, Crest and Motto of the Edwardes family ==
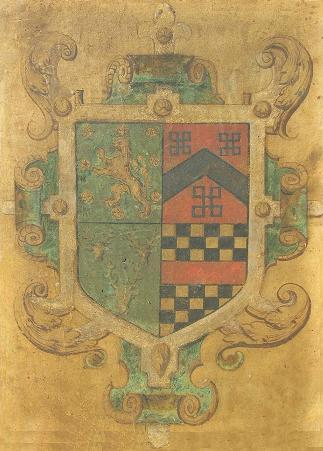
Edwardes of Rhydygors Coat-of-Arms

As given in A Genealogical and Heraldic Dictionary of the Landed Gentry of Great Britain and Ireland, written by Sir Bernard Burke, 1862.

ARMS – Quarterly, 1st, Sable (black), a lion rampant within an orle of cinquefoils Or (gold); 2nd, Gules (red), a chevron Or (gold), between three bowers' knots; 3rd, Sable (black), three buck's heads cabossed Argent (silver); 4th, chequy Or (gold) and Sable (black), a fess Argent (silver).

The coat-of-arms of Edwardes of Rhyd-y-gors are shown at right.

CREST – A demi-lion Or (gold), holding between the paws a bower's knot.

MOTTO – ASPERA AD VIRTUTEM EST VIA...(Rough is the path to virtue).

== Picture gallery ==
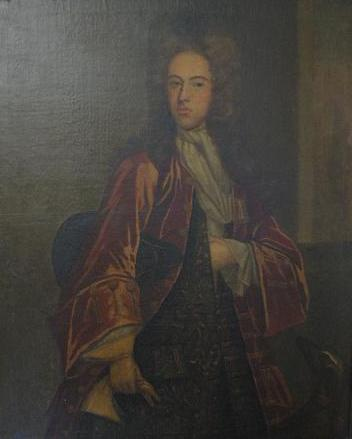
Captain John Edwardes, Grandfather of Admiral Edwardes, inherited Rhyd-y-gors 1690, from David Edwardes, Actuary

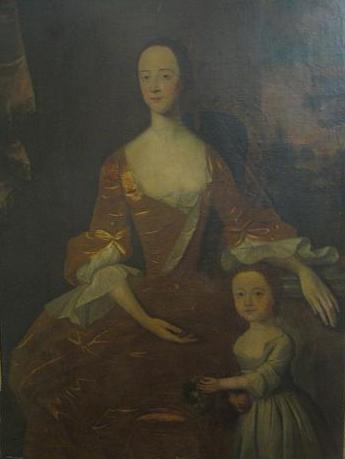
Anne Edwardes (Nee Blomart), Wife of Admiral David Edwardes RN

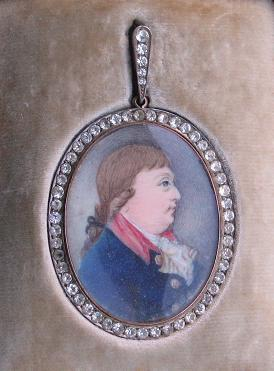
Miniature of Admiral David Edwardes RN 1716–1785
