= Caio, Carmarthenshire =

Village in Carmarthenshire, Wales

Coordinates: 52.041504°N 3.932784°W

Caio: Welsh: Caeo
- Village
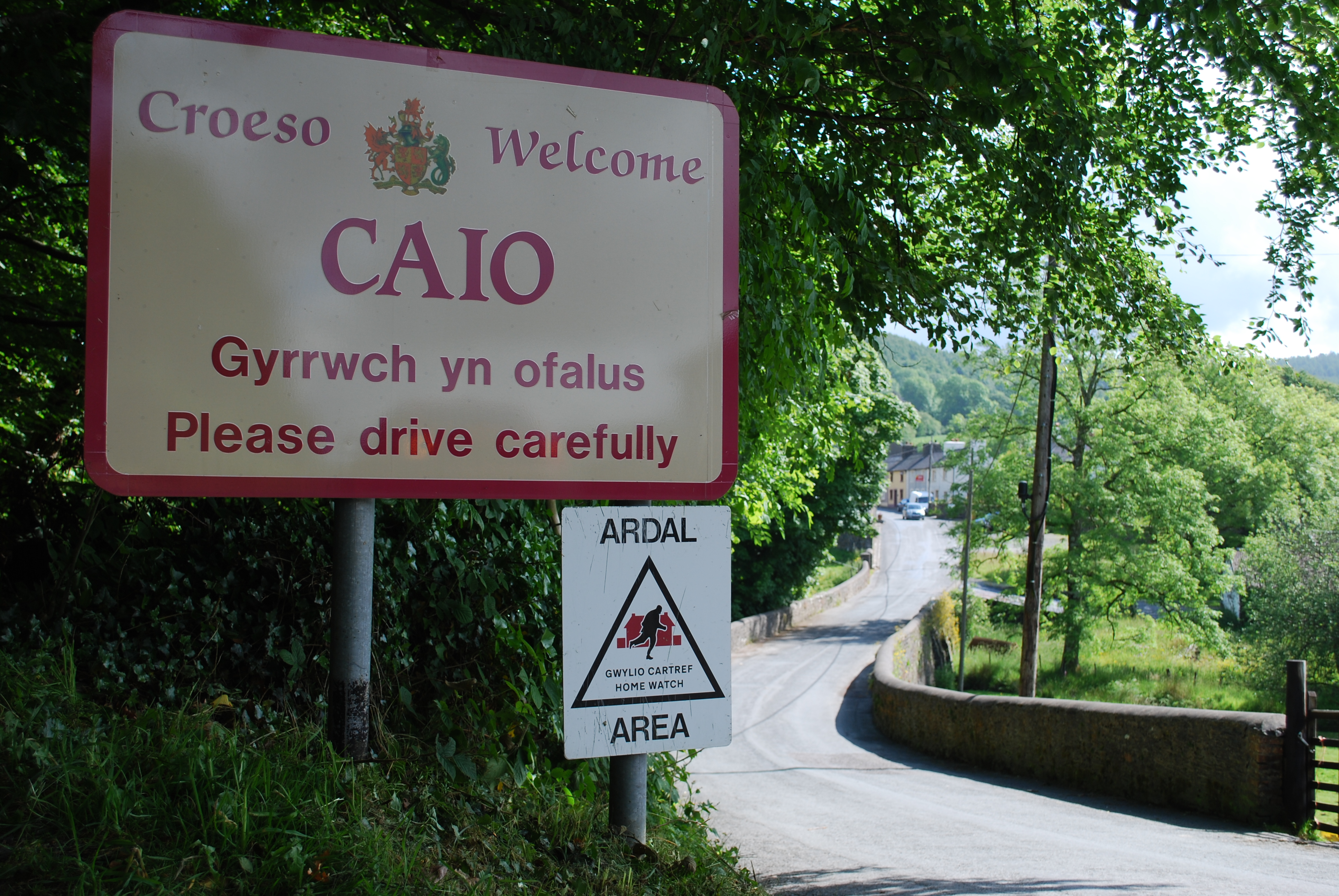

- Location within Carmarthenshire
- Community: Cynwyl Gaeo
- Principal area: Carmarthenshire
- Country: Wales
- Sovereign state: United Kingdom
- Police: Dyfed-Powys
- Fire: Mid and West Wales
- Ambulance: Welsh
- UK Parliament: Caerfyrddin

Caio (or Caeo) is a village in the county of Carmarthenshire, south-west Wales, sited near to the Dolaucothi Gold Mines.

== Location ==
It is located between Llandovery and Lampeter, 1 mile (1.6 kilometres) north-east of the A482 that connects these two towns. Caio lies at the confluence of the Afon Annell and the Nant Frena. It forms part of the parish of Cynwyl Gaeo. In former times it gave its name to Cayo Hundred.

== History ==
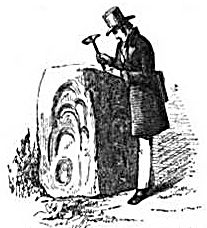
Carreg Pumsaint

The parish church, consecrated to Saint Cynwyl, now stands at the centre of the village, near the Roman road that linked the Roman forts at Llandovery (Alabum) and Llanio (Bremia), and the Roman gold mines at Dolaucothi. The Roman road remained in use until the late 18th century, mainly as a cattle-road or Drover's road. The Dolaucothi Estate long held by the Johnes family is now a tourist attraction owned by the National Trust. A pounding-stone long known as Carreg Pumsaint and a possible holy well are located nearby.

The oldest record of a chapel in the village is the Tynewydd Calvinistic Methodists chapel which was built around 1774. The old Ysgol Gynradd Caio stands next to the church, and was built in 1869. It taught primarily through the medium of Welsh, but closed in 2012.

== Notable people ==
- Llywelyn ap Gruffydd Fychan (ca.1341 – 1401), a Caio landowner, executed by Henry IV for his allegiance to Owain Glyndŵr.
- Dafydd Jones (1711–1777), hymnist, known as Dafydd Jones o Gaeo was born in the area.
- Joshua Thomas (1719–1797), a Welsh writer and Particular Baptist minister
- Brothers John Dafydd (1727–1783) and Morgan Dafydd (m. 1762), hymnist, are connected to the village.
- James Hills-Johnes (1833–1919), recipient of the Victoria Cross, is buried here.
- John Strand-Jones (1877–1958), Wales rugby union football international, later clergyman, was born in Caio,

== Amenities ==
Other amenities include Caio Post Office (closed in the 1990s) and a public house, the Brunant Arms. At the turn of the 20th century there were several public houses, the "Brunant Arms", the "Sexton's Arms", which was run out of someone's front room, and the "King's Head Inn".

== In film ==
In 1966 BBC Wales produced the documentary "A Village Called Caio" about rural life in rural West Wales. They paid a retrospective visit in 2008, to see how the village had changed.

== See also ==
- James Hills-Johnes
