= William George Cubitt =

British army officer and Victoria Cross recipient

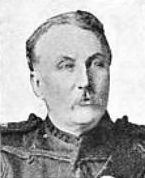
- Born: 19 October 1835; Calcutta, British India
- Died: 25 January 1903 (aged 67); Camberley, Surrey, England
- Burial place: St. Peter's Churchyard, Frimley, Surrey
- Relatives: Sir James Hills-Johnes VC (brother-in-law); Lewis Pugh Evans VC (nephew)
- Military career
- Allegiance: United Kingdom
- Branch: Bengal Army; British Indian Army
- Service years: 1853–1892
- Rank: Colonel
- Conflicts: Santhal rebellion Indian Mutiny; Second Anglo-Afghan War; Akha Expedition; Third Anglo-Burmese War
- Awards: Victoria Cross; Distinguished Service Order; Mentioned in Despatches (2)

Colonel William George Cubitt, VC, DSO (19 October 1835 – 25 January 1903) was a senior officer in the British Indian Army and a recipient of the Victoria Cross, the highest award for gallantry in the face of the enemy that can be awarded to British and Commonwealth forces.

== Military career ==
Cubitt was born in Calcutta, the son of Major W. Cubitt, an Indian Army officer. After an education in England, Cubitt entered the Indian Army as an ensign in the 13th Bengal Native Infantry, Bengal Army, on 26 July 1853. He first saw active service in the Santhal campaign of 1855.

Cubitt was 21 years old, and a lieutenant in the 13th Bengal Native Infantry when, during the Indian Mutiny, the following deed took place at the siege of Lucknow, for which he was awarded the VC.

For having on the retreat from Chinhut, on the 30th of June, 1857, saved the lives of three men of the 32nd Regiment, at the risk of his own.

After the Indian Mutiny, Cubitt continued to serve with the Indian Army. In 1875 he took part in the Duffla Expedition, for which he was mentioned in despatches, and in 1880 was with the Khyber line force during the Second Anglo-Afghan War. Promoted colonel in July 1883, he served with the Akha Expedition in 1883–84, and in the Third Anglo-Burmese War in 1886–87, during which he was awarded the Distinguished Service Order (DSO). At the time of his retirement in 1892 he was in command of the 43rd Gurkhas (later the 8th Gurkha Rifles).

His medals, including the VC, are on display in the Lord Ashcroft Gallery at the Imperial War Museum, London.

== Personal life ==
In 1863 Cubitt married Charlotte Isabella Hills, daughter of James Hills, of Nischindipore, Bengal, and sister of Lieutenant-General Sir James Hills-Johnes VC. They had three sons and two daughters.

On retirement, Cubitt lived in Camberley, Surrey. He died on 25 January 1903, aged 67, and was buried in St. Peter's Churchyard, Frimley, Surrey.
