= Joshua Thomas =

Historian of Welsh Baptists (1719–1797)

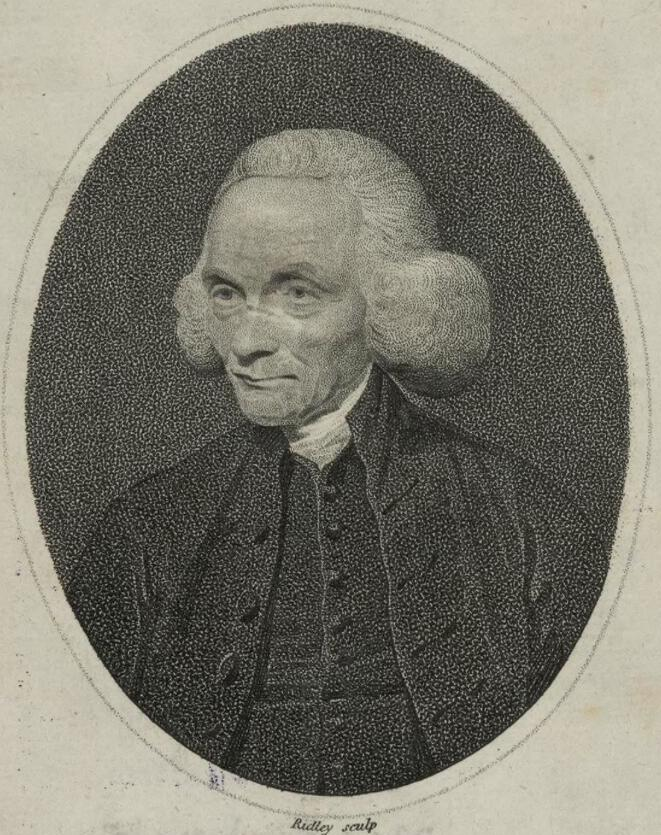
Joshua Thomas

Joshua Thomas (1719–1797) was a Welsh writer and Particular Baptist minister, known for his history of Welsh Baptists.

== Life ==
He was the eldest son of Morgan Thomas of Tyhên in the parish of Caio, Carmarthenshire, where he was born on 22 February 1719. In 1739 he was apprenticed to his uncle, Simon Thomas, who was a mercer and independent minister at Hereford. Simon Thomas was the author of works in Welsh and in English, mostly printed at a private press of his own, including Hanes y Byd a'r Amseroedd, a summary of universal history.

In 1746 Joshua Thomas married and settled in business at Hay, Breconshire, where he preached occasionally at the Baptist chapel of Maesyberllan, where he was appointed co-pastor in 1749. In 1754 he undertook the pastorship of the Baptist church in Leominster, where he kept a day-school until his death.

Thomas died at Leominster on 25 August 1797.

== Works ==
Thomas's major work was his history of the Baptists in Wales, published in 1778 under the title Hanes y Bedyddwyr ymhlith y Cymry, o amser yr Apostolion hyd y flwyddyn hon, Carmarthen. A supplement of corrections and additions was also issued in 1780. The author's own manuscript translation into English of this work, with additions, was preserved in the Baptists' Library in Bristol. Thomas subsequently wrote, in English, A History of the Baptist Association in Wales, which first appeared in the Baptist Register between 1791 and 1795, and was published in book form in the latter year (London). These two works were sources of information on the early history of the Baptist denomination in Wales. A new edition of the Welsh history, with additions, was brought out by Benjamin Davies of Pontypridd in 1885.

Thomas also translated into Welsh works dealing with Baptist doctrines, including:

- Dr. Gill's Reply to the Arguments for Infant Baptism, advanced by Griffith Jones of Llanddowror, with some additions by Thomas himself, 1751.
- Tystiolaeth y Credadyn am ei hawl i'r Nefoedd, 1757.
- Samuel Ewer's Reply to Edward Hitchin on Infant Baptism, with additions by Thomas, Carmarthen, 1767.
- Robert Hall's Doctrine of the Trinity, Carmarthen, 1794.

== Family ==
As many as eleven members of Thomas's family entered the Baptist ministry. His son Timothy Thomas (1753–1827) was for 47 years pastor of the church at Devonshire Square, Bishopsgate. Two of Joshua's brothers, Timothy (1720–1768) and Zechariah (1727–1816), were successively pastors of Aberduar church, Carmarthenshire. The former was the author or translator of several doctrinal works in Welsh, and a volume of hymns (1764).

== Notes ==
Attribution

This article incorporates text from a publication now in the public domain: Lee, Sidney, ed. (1898). "Thomas, Joshua". Dictionary of National Biography. Vol. 56. London: Smith, Elder & Co.
