= Alfred Eteson =

Deputy surgeon general with the Bengal Medical Service

Alfred Eteson CB
- Born: 29 April 1832
- Died: 15 February 1910 (aged 77)
- Education: University of St. Andrews
- Occupation: Physician

Alfred Eteson CB (29 April 1832 – 15 February 1910) was deputy surgeon general with the Bengal Medical Service. He served during the Indian Rebellion of 1857 and the Second Anglo-Afghan War and was mentioned in dispatches three times.

== Early life and education ==
Alfred Eteson was born on 29 April 1832. He became a member of the Royal College of Surgeons in 1854, and obtained his degree in medicine at the University of St. Andrews in 1878.

He married Evelyn Margaret Fenton, daughter of John Fenton of Ealing, Middlesex. She died at Roorkee, in the North-Western Provinces of India, on 31 August 1868 at the age of 22.

== Career ==
Eteson joined the Bengal Medical Service as an assistant surgeon in May 1854. He rose to become deputy surgeon general in December 1883 after which he served as medical officer in Assam before retiring in 1889. In 1869 he treated an epidemic of ague among sappers and miners at Roorkee with quinine, arsenic, and sulphate of zinc. He attributed the disease to "the reflux tide of easterly winds laden with the pestiferous miasma of the Oudh and Rohilkund Terai".

He served in two major conflicts during his career. Firstly, the Indian Rebellion of 1857 (Indian Mutiny) of 1857–58, during which he was present at the relief of Arrah (1857), the capture of Juddespore, and the actions at Amorha and Khiree in modern Uttar Pradesh. He was mentioned in dispatches three times, and was awarded the Indian Mutiny Medal. Secondly, he served during the Second Anglo-Afghan War in 1879, and received the Afghanistan Medal. He also took part in the Akha Expedition in 1883–84.

In 1907, he was made a Companion of the Bath in connection with the fiftieth anniversary of the mutiny.

In 1892 he was a member of the Hertfordshire Natural History Society and Field Club.

== Death and legacy ==
Eteson died after a short illness on 15 February 1910. His residence at the time of his death was Longridge Road, Kensington, Middlesex. He left an estate of £2,024. Probate was granted to Beatrice Lilian Whelpdale, wife of Arthur William Whelpdale, Harold Anthony Beeching, bank manager, and Gerald Arthur Eteson, brewer.
