= Robert Hills (cricketer, born 1837) =

Scottish cricketer and merchant

Personal information
- Full name: Robert Savi Hills
- Born: 8 May 1837; Neechindipur, Bengal Presidency, British India
- Died: 5 January 1909 (aged 71); Inverurie, Aberdeenshire, Scotland
- Batting: Unknown

Domestic team information
- Years: Team
- 1867–1876: Marylebone Cricket Club

Career statistics
Competition	First-class
Matches	2
Runs scored	17
Batting average	4.25
100s/50s	–/–
Top score	8
Catches/stumpings	1/–
- Source: Cricinfo, 15 August 2021

Robert Savi Hills (8 May 1837 — 5 January 1909) was a Scottish first-class cricketer and merchant.

The son of James Hills, he was born at Neechindipur in British India in May 1837. He was educated at Edinburgh Academy, before studying in England at Rugby School. After completing his education, Hills went to British India as a merchant. There he played club cricket for Calcutta Cricket and Club. Hills played two first-class matches for the Marylebone Cricket Club nine years apart. The first came against Lancashire in 1867, with the second coming against Derbyshire in 1876. He scored 17 runs in his two matches, with a highest score of 8. In 1896, Hills married Agnes Leonore Hay of Bothwell, Lanarkshire. The couple would have eight children, one of whom was killed during the Second World War. They lived in Aberdeenshire at Keith Hall, with Hills dying there in January 1909. His brother was James Hills-Johnes, a recipient of the Victoria Cross during the Siege of Delhi in 1857.
