= Lewis Pugh Evans =

Recipient of the Victoria Cross

Brigadier-General Lewis Pugh Evans VC CB CMG DSO* DL
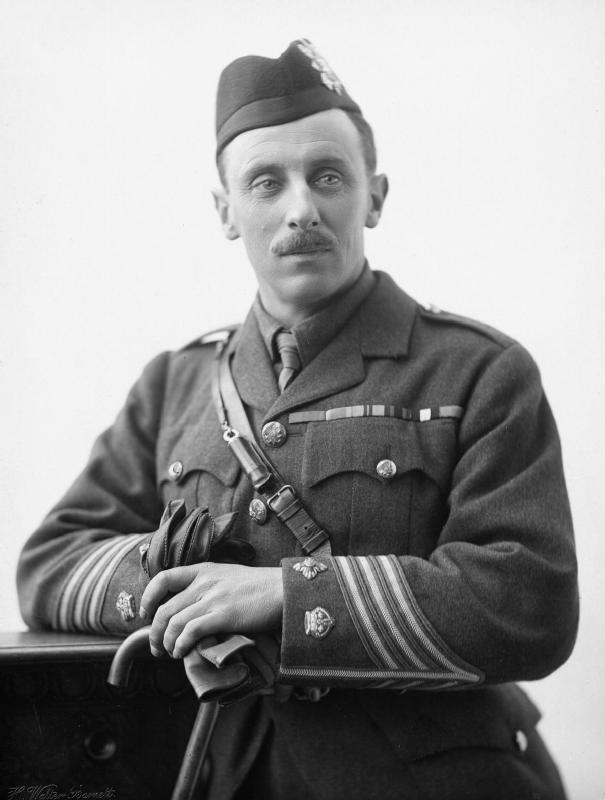
- Lieutenant-Colonel Lewis Pugh Evans, c. 1918
- Born: 3 January 1881; Abermad, Cardiganshire, Wales
- Died: 30 November 1962 (aged 81); Paddington, London, England
- Burial place: Llanbadarn Fawr, Ceredigion
- Relatives: Sir James Hills-Johnes VC (uncle); William George Cubitt VC (uncle)
- Military career
- Allegiance: United Kingdom
- Branch: British Army
- Service years: 1899–1938; 1939–1941
- Rank: Brigadier-General
- Service number: 352
- Commands: 159th Brigade; 2nd Battalion, Black Watch; 14th Brigade; Black Watch; 1st Battalion, Lincolnshire Regiment
- Conflicts: Second Boer War; First World War: Western Front; Battle of Passchendaele; German spring offensive; Second World War
- Awards: Victoria Cross; Companion of the Order of the Bath; Companion of the Order of St Michael and St George; Distinguished Service Order & Bar; Mentioned in Despatches (7); Officer of the Order of Leopold (Belgium); Croix de guerre (France)

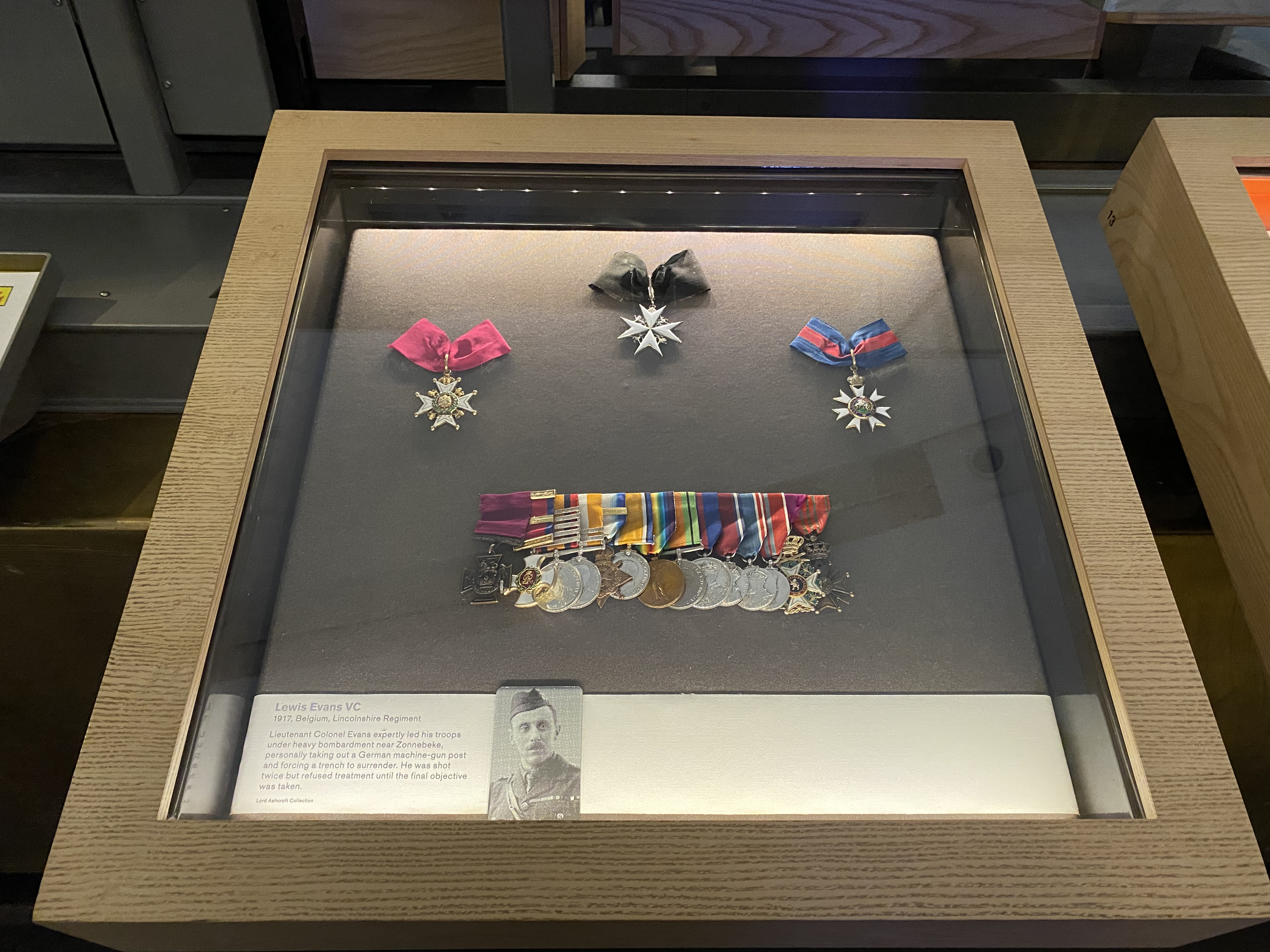
Evans's medals on display at the Imperial War Museum, London

Brigadier-General Lewis Pugh Evans, VC, CB, CMG, DSO & Bar, DL (3 January 1881 – 30 November 1962) was a British Army officer and a recipient of the Victoria Cross, the highest award for gallantry in the face of the enemy that can be awarded to British and Commonwealth forces.

== Early years and family ==
Lewis Pugh Evans was born at Abermad Llanfarian to Sir Gruffydd Humphrey Pugh Evans (1840–1902), Advocate-General of Bengal and a member of the Viceroy's Council, and Lady Emilia Savi Pugh Evans (née Hills; 1849–1938). Lewis Pugh Evans was educated at Eton and entered the army after training at the Royal Military College, Sandhurst.

Lewis Pugh Evans married Margaret Dorothea Seagrave Vaughan-Pryse-Rice on 10 October 1918. They lived at Lovesgrove on the death of his elder brother in 1945.

== Military career ==
Following a year at Sandhurst, Evans entered the British Army with a commission in the Black Watch as second lieutenant on 23 December 1899, and served with the 2nd battalion in the Second Boer War in South Africa. He took part in operations in the Orange Free State February to May 1900, including the battles of Poplar Grove, Driefontein and Vet River; operations in the Transvaal May–June 1900, including the actions around Johannesburg, the occupation of Pretoria and the battle of Diamond Hill; and the Battle of Belfast (August 1900). After the end of the conventional war he served with his battalion in the Orange River Colony during the Boer guerrilla warfare until peace was declared in June 1902. Following the end of the war in South Africa he left Point Natal for British India on the SS Ionian in October 1902 with other officers and men of his battalion, which after arrival in Bombay was stationed in Sialkot in Umballa in Punjab. After service with his regiment in India, Evans returned to England and obtained a pilot's certificate.

=== First World War ===
When the First World War broke out in the summer of 1914 he was posted as an air observer with the Royal Flying Corps, and from May 1915 served as a brigade major, but after a few months he returned to the Black Watch and in 1917 was appointed to command the 1st Battalion, Lincolnshire Regiment.

On 4 October 1917 near Zonnebeke, Belgium, Pugh was commanding his battalion when the following deed took place for which he was awarded the VC:

For most conspicuous bravery and leadership. Lt.-Col. Evans took his battalion in perfect order through a terrific enemy barrage, personally formed up all units, and led them to the assault. While a strong machine gun emplacement was causing casualties, and the troops were working round the flank, Lt.-Col. Evans rushed at it himself and by firing his revolver through the loophole forced the garrison to capitulate. After capturing the first objective he was severely wounded in the shoulder, but refused to be bandaged, and re-formed the troops, pointed out all future objectives, and again led his battalion forward. Again badly wounded, he nevertheless continued to command until the second objective was won, and, after consolidation, collapsed from loss of blood. As there were numerous casualties, he refused assistance, and by his own efforts ultimately reached the Dressing Station. His example of cool bravery stimulated in all ranks the highest valour and determination to win.

After recovering from his wounds he returned to duty with the 1st Battalion. On 9 April 1918 their lines came under attack in the Germans' Spring Offensive in a three-day battle. He was awarded for this a Bar to his Distinguished Service Order, the citation for which read:

On the first day he was moving about everywhere in his forward area during operations, the next day he personally conducted reconnaissance for the counterattack, which he carried out on the third day. It was largely due to his untiring energy and method that the enemy was checked and finally driven out.

On 10 June 1918 he was made general officer commanding (GOC) of the 14th Infantry Brigade of the 32nd Division, taking over from Frederick Lumsden, who had been killed, and was granted the temporary rank of brigadier general while employed in this role. He was still in command by the end of hostilities in November.

=== Between the wars ===
He was appointed as a GSO2 from a brigade major in March 1922.

=== Awards ===
Evans was mentioned in despatches seven times and was awarded the Distinguished Service Order and Bar; the 1914 Star and Clasp; the British War Medal; the Victory Medal; the Order of Leopold (Belgium) and the Croix de Guerre. He was made a Companion of the Order of St Michael and St George in 1919, and a Companion of the Order of the Bath in 1938, and was also appointed an Officer of the Venerable Order of the Hospital of St John of Jerusalem.

He also as a living recipient of the Victoria Cross received the King George V Silver Jubilee Medal (1935), King George VI Coronation Medal (1937), and Queen Elizabeth II Coronation Medal (1953).

His VC is on display in the Lord Ashcroft Gallery at the Imperial War Museum, London.

== Retirement ==
In 1938 he retired from the army but returned to service in the Second World War as a Military Liaison Officer at the Headquarters of the Wales Region. He worked with the Special Operations Executive in India. He later achieved the rank of brigadier. Between October 1947 and January 1951 he was Honorary Colonel of the 16th Battalion, the Parachute Regiment.

Pugh Evans was Honorary Colonel of the Army Cadet Force in Ceredigion and was for 25 years President of the Aberystwyth Branch of the Royal British Legion.

He was a Churchwarden at Llanbadarn Fawr, where he now lies buried, and a Justice of the Peace on the local bench as well as Deputy Lieutenant for Cardiganshire and a Freeman of the borough of Aberystwyth.

He died of a heart attack, aged eighty-one, at Paddington Station, London.
