= James Hills-Johnes =

British general and Victoria Cross recipient

Lieutenant-General Sir James Hills-Johnes VC GCB JP DL
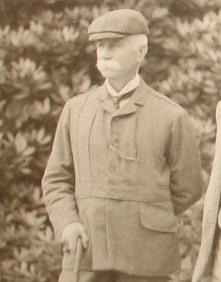
- Sir James Hills-Johnes, c. 1900s
- Born: James Hills; 20 August 1833; Neechindipur, British India
- Died: 3 January 1919 (aged 85); Dolaucothi Estate, Carmarthenshire, Wales
- Burial place: Caio, Carmarthenshire
- Relatives: William George Cubitt VC (brother-in-law); Lewis Pugh Evans VC (nephew)
- Military career
- Allegiance: United Kingdom
- Branch: Bengal Army; British Army
- Service years: 1853–1888
- Rank: Lieutenant-General
- Nickname: Jemmy
- Units: Bengal Horse Artillery; Royal Artillery
- Commands: 3rd Division, Northern Afghanistan Field Force; Military Governor of Kabul; Kohat District; Peshawar Mountain Battery
- Conflicts: Indian Mutiny; Abyssinian War; Lushai Expedition; Second Anglo-Afghan War
- Awards: Victoria Cross; Knight Grand Cross of the Order of the Bath; Mentioned in Despatches (4)

Lieutenant-General Sir James Hills-Johnes, VC, GCB, JP, DL (20 August 1833 – 3 January 1919) was a British Indian Army officer and a recipient of the Victoria Cross, the highest award for gallantry in the face of the enemy that can be awarded to British and Commonwealth forces.

== Early life ==
Born James Hills on 20 August 1833 in Neechindipur, Bengal, India, he was the son of James and Charlotte Hills. He was educated at the Edinburgh Academy (1843–1847), the Edinburgh Institution (1847–1850) and the Addiscombe Military Seminary (1851–1853), and was commissioned into the Bengal Artillery in 1853. Hills changed his surname to Hills-Johnes in 1882 on his marriage to Elizabeth Johnes, the younger daughter and coheiress of John Johnes of Dolaucothi, Carmarthenshire.

== Military career ==
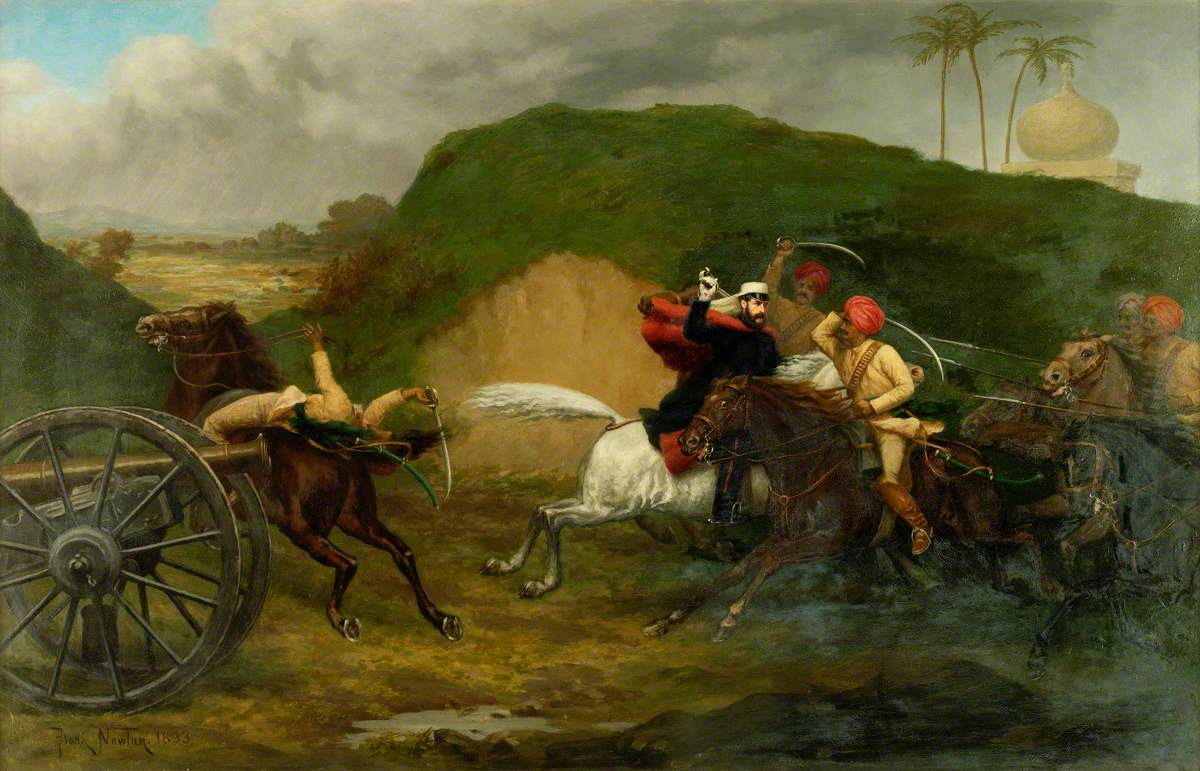
James Hill-Johnes at the Siege of Delhi

Hills was a 23 year old second lieutenant in the Bengal Horse Artillery during the Indian Mutiny at the Siege of Delhi on 9 July 1857 for which he and Henry Tombs, commander of the Bengal Horse Artillery contingent were together awarded the Victoria Cross.

Hills had been on picket duty with two guns near the camp when enemy cavalry attacked. In order to give the guns time, Hills rode straight at the enemy, cutting down two of them before he was knocked from his horse. Getting up he was attacked by the enemy. Hills shot one, avoided the lance of another and cut him with his sword before finishing the first attacker. A third grappled with Hills and took his sword from him but Tombs, who had come up to check the guns, arrived in time and shot the man. On the way back to the position, they encountered another of the enemy. Hills and Tombs parried the first attacks but Hills then took a blow to the head and went down; Tombs "put his sword through the man" saving Hills for the second time.

The official citation in the London Gazette 27 April 1858 read:

Lieutenant-Colonel Henry Tombs, C.B., and Lieutenant James Hills

Date of Act of Bravery, 9 July 1857
For very gallant conduct on the part of Lieutenant Hills before Delhi, in defending the position assigned to him in case of alarm, and for noble behaviour on the part of Lieutenant-Colonel Tombs in twice coming to his subaltern's rescue, and on each occasion killing his man.

(See despatch of Lieutenant-Colonel Mackenzie, Commanding 1st Brigade Horse Artillery, dated Camp, near Delhi, 10 July 1857, published in the Supplement to the London Gazette of 16 January 1858.)

In addition to the Delhi clasp of the Indian Mutiny Medal, Hills received the Lucknow clasp awarded to troops under command of Sir Colin Campbell who were engaged in final operations leading to the surrender of Lucknow and the clearing of the surrounding areas from November 1857 to March 1858.

After a number of staff appointments, Hills served as an artillery officer in the Abyssinian campaign of 1867–68 and the Lushai Expedition of 1871–72. Promoted major-general in July 1879, he fought in the Second Anglo-Afghan War (1878–80), and was made military governor of Kabul in October 1879 and commanded a division in 1880. For services in Afghanistan he was appointed Knight Commander of the Order of the Bath (KCB) in March 1881. Hills-Johnes was promoted lieutenant-general in January 1884 and retired in 1888. He was made a Knight Grand Cross of the Order of the Bath (GCB) in June 1893.

== Later life ==
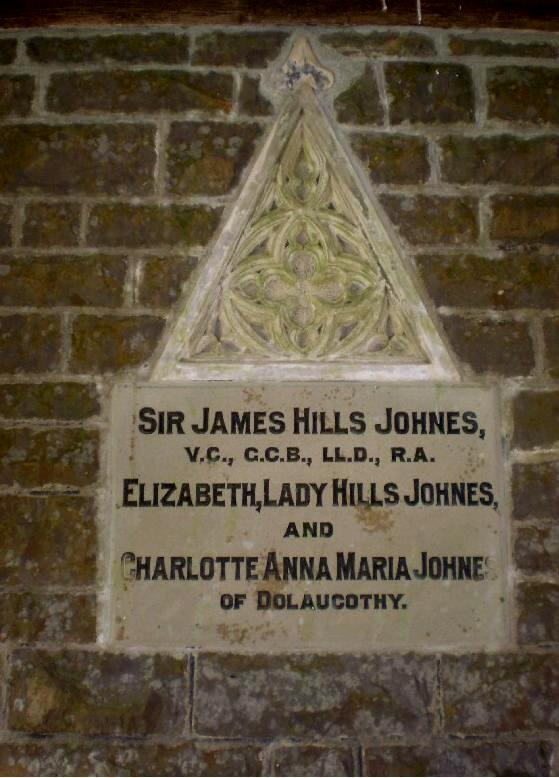
Memorial to Lt General Sir James Hills-Johnes in the lychgate of the Caio churchyard

Hills-Johnes was High Sheriff of Carmarthenshire in 1886 and made an honorary freeman of the town of Carmarthen in 1910. He also served as a member of Carmarthenshire County Council. He was appointed Honorary Colonel of the Royal Carmarthen Artillery, the local Militia unit, on 25 February 1891. He was a long standing friend of Lord Roberts, and in 1900 he accompanied Roberts in a private capacity during the South African War.

He died of influenza during the post-war pandemic on 3 January 1919, aged 85, at his Dolaucothi Estate and was buried at Caio, Carmarthenshire.

Hills-Johnes had five brothers and four sisters. The brothers included Major-General Sir John Hills (1834–1902) of the Bombay Engineers; Robert Hills (1837–1909), a first-class cricketer who was the brother-in-law of Lieutenant William George Cubitt VC and uncle of Brigadier Lewis Pugh Evans VC; and Charles Hills (1847–1935), the family history saying he was the real father of Hollywood actress Merle Oberon.

His medals, including the Victoria Cross, are displayed at the Royal Artillery Museum, Woolwich, London.
