= Afon Annell =

River in Carmarthenshire, Wales

Coordinates: 52°00′09″N 3°58′30″W

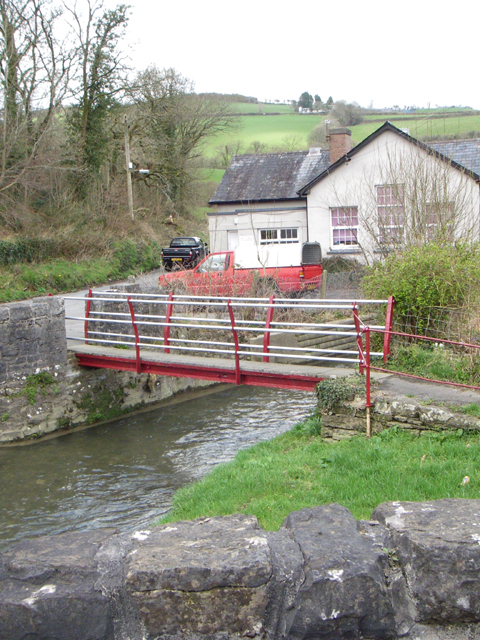
Footbridge over the Annell at Whitemill

Afon Annell (River Annell) is a small river in Carmarthenshire, Wales.

It is a tributary of the Afon Cothi.

Some of the waters of the Annell were previously diverted via aqueduct to serve the Roman gold mine at Dolaucothi.
