= Historical inheritance systems =

Methods of determining inheritance

Historical inheritance systems are different systems of inheritance among various people.

== Cross cultural research about systems of inheritance ==
=== Land inheritance ===
Land inheritance customs greatly vary across cultures. The Ethnographic Atlas gives the following data regarding land distribution: primogeniture predominates in 247 societies, while ultimogeniture prevails in 16. In 19 societies land is exclusively or predominantly given to the one adjudged best qualified, while equality predominates in 301 societies. Regarding land inheritance rules, in 340 societies sons inherit, in 90 other patrilineal heirs (such as brothers), in 31 sister's sons, in 60 other matrilineal heirs (such as daughters or brothers), and in 98 all children. In 43 societies land is given to all children, but daughters receive less. In 472 societies, the distribution of inherited land follows no clear rules or information is missing, while in 436 societies inheritance rules for real property do not exist or data is missing; this is partly because there are many societies where there is little or no land to inherit, such as in hunter-gatherer or pastoral societies.

Patrilineal primogeniture, where the eldest son inherits, was customary among many cultures around the world. Patrilineal ultimogeniture, where the youngest son inherits, was customary among a number of cultures including: Fur, Fali, Sami (also called Lapp), Bashkir, Chuvash, Gagauz, Vep, Tatar, Achang, Ayi, Atayal, Kachi, Biate, Chinantec, Hmar, Mro, Kom, Purum and Lushei or Lushai (sometimes mistakenly taken for the whole Mizo people, especially in the past).

Among English peasants there was no clearly prevalent inheritance pattern, while Spanish Basques gave their land to the one considered best qualified, though they had a preference for sons. Giving more or less equal shares of land to sons, but excluded daughters was also common in many populations, as was giving relatively equal shares to both sons and daughters or slightly less to daughters. The same system prevails in contemporary Egypt and most Arab groups (see Islamic inheritance jurisprudence). Most non-Arab Muslims, with some exceptions (Caucasians, Iranians), historically followed their own inheritance customs, not those of the Sharia. In Ancient Egypt the eldest son inherited twice as much as other sons, and in earlier times he was the sole heir.

Among the Lao, the Aceh, the Guanches, and the Minangkabau, all daughters inherited equal shares of land. The Cham, the Jaintia, the Garo, and the Khasi practiced female ultimogeniture. Primogeniture, regardless of the sex of the child, was customary among the Paiwan, the Ifugao, the Chugach, and the French Basques. While ultimogeniture, regardless of the sex of the child, was customary among the Chuvash and the Mari.

Bilateral primogeniture is a rarer custom of inheritance where the eldest son inherits from the father and the eldest daughter inherits from the mother. This practice was common among the Classic Mayas, who transmitted the family's household furnishings from mother to eldest daughter, and the family's land, houses and agricultural tools from father to eldest son. It was also seen in the Greek island of Karpathos, where the family's house was transmitted from mother to eldest daughter, and the family's land was transmitted from father to eldest son. Among the Igorot, the father's land is inherited by his eldest son and the mother's land is inherited by her eldest daughter.

A review of numerous studies found that the pattern of land inheritance traditionally prevalent among English, Dutch and New Englander peasants was partible inheritance. The pattern of land inheritance traditionally prevalent among Russian peasants was found to be close to patrilineal primogeniture, "as oldest sons may well inherit more". The conclusions of this review contradicts previous reports that Russians practiced equal inheritance of land by all sons and that the English, Dutch and New Englanders had no definite inheritance pattern.

In easternmost Europe, patrilineal ultimogeniture prevailed among most Turkic peoples. Equal inheritance of property by all sons prevailed among most Finno-Ugric peoples, and patrilineal primogeniture prevailed among Estonians and Balts.

Inheritance customs are sometimes considered a culturally distinctive aspect of a society. Although it is often thought that the Mizos employ ultimogeniture, this is because the customs of Lushais or Lusheis are confused with those of all Mizos; Mizo and Lushai have been occasionally used interchangeably. Among most non-Lushai Mizos, primogeniture predominates, just as among Kukis. In general there is great confusion about the ethnic identity of the many northeastern Indian tribes. Some regard the generic term Zomi as most appropriate.

=== Inheritance of movable property ===
The same disparity is seen regarding inheritance of movable property. Most nomadic peoples from Asia, for example the Khalka Mongols, give a more or less equal share of the herd to each son as he marries. Typically the youngest remain behind caring for the parents and inheriting his father's tent after their death in addition to his own share of the herd. However, others, such as the Yukaghir and the Yakuts, leave most of the herd to one son (in the above examples the youngest and the eldest, respectively). Some pastoral peoples from other geographical areas also practice unequal wealth transfers, although customs of equal male inheritance are more common among them than among agriculturalists.

Patrilineal primogeniture with regards to both livestock and land was practiced by the Tswana people, whose main source of wealth was livestock, although they also practiced agriculture. This practice was also seen in other southern Bantu peoples, such as the Tsonga, or the Venda. Although, among the Venda, while the livestock was inherited by the eldest son, land was not inherited within families but given to each son by village authorities as he married. Among the Tsonga, most of the land was used only for stockbreeding. Patrilineal primogeniture also prevailed among the neighboring Khoi peoples, of whom only the Nama (among whom patrilineal primogeniture also prevailed)remain.

Many other African peoples also practiced patrilineal primogeniture with regards to livestock. These included: The Ngoni, the Gogo, the Mangbetu, the Rendille, the Sapo, the Boran, the Gabra, the Plains Pokot, the Hema, the Beti-Pahuin, the Buduma, the Dogon, the Duala, the Djafun and the Kassena. According to the Ethnographic Atlas, the Fulbe or Fulani, the largest pastoral people in Africa, divided their livestock equally between all sons. However, according to some other sources they practiced male primogeniture.

Chukchi, Koryak and Ket peoples practiced male ultimogeniture. It has been stated that the rest of Siberian peoples, such as Voguls, Samoyeds or Khantys, practiced patrilineal primogeniture, though there isn't much reliable information about the traditional customs of Siberian peoples. It is said that Gilyaks divided their cattle equally between all sons. Patrilineal primogeniture was also traditionally prevalent among pastoral peoples from Australia, such as the Aranda, as well as among Himalayan pastoralists like the Changpa.

Patrilineal primogeniture was traditionally prevalent among some pastoral peoples from Greenland and northern Canada. The neighboring indigenous peoples of the Pacific Northwest Coast were organized in societies where elder sons and their lines of descent had higher status than younger sons and their lines of descent (a "conical clan"), although a rule of patrilineal primogeniture couldn't develop among most of them since they were mostly hunter-gatherers. However, rule of patrilineal primogeniture did develop among some Canadian indigenous peoples who practiced agriculture, such as the Montagnais, the Kutchin, the Pikangikum, the Ojibwa, the Klallam and the Atsugewi. Canadian indigenous peoples were influenced by the ancient Thule culture, of which little is known with certainty.

=== Other sources ===
Intergenerational wealth transmission among agriculturalists tends to be rather unequal. Only slightly more than half of the societies studied practice equal division of real property; customs to preserve land relatively intact (most commonly primogeniture) are very common. Wealth transfers are more egalitarian among pastoralists, but unequal inheritance customs also prevail in some of these societies, and they are strongly patrilineal.

A study of 39 non-Western societies found many customs that distinguished between children according to their sex and birth order. First sons, in comparison to other sons, "are likely to inherit or otherwise gain control of more family land, livestock, or other wealth." First sons inherited more than the other sons among 11 societies studied. Among the Todas, both first and last sons inherited more than the other sons. Last sons inherited more than the other sons among the Lolo and the Yukaghir, and inherited less among the Luo. The people found to have the greatest number of customs favourable to first sons in the study were the Tswana, followed closely by the Azande. The people with the greatest number of customs favorable to last sons in their study were the Lolo. This study confirmed ethnographers' claims that customs favorable to first sons were common in South Asia, Austronesia and Sub-Saharan Africa, while customs favorable to last sons were common among the ethnic minorities of Southwest China.

The only custom that distinguished between sons among the Dagor Mongols was that first sons received more respect from his siblings and last sons received less respect from their siblings. This contradicts those theories that maintain that peoples of the Asian steppe had strong customs favorable to first or last sons. In fact, the indigenous American peoples had significantly more customs favorable to first sons than the Dagor Mongols.

Among Arab peoples, such as the Egyptian Fellahin, all sons inherited the same and had the same wealth. This was also seen among the Alaska Native peoples such as the Eyak.

Jack Goody was an influential anthropologist during the twentieth century. However, his theories have been mostly rejected during the last decades. He made a distinction between a complete and a preferential form of primogeniture and ultimogeniture. In the complete form of both customs, the rest of the children are excluded from the inheritance. However, in the preferential form of primogeniture, the eldest son acts as custodian of the father's rights on behalf of his brothers. In the preferential form of ultimogeniture, the youngest son inherits the residue of his father's property after elder sons have received their shares during the father's lifetime. Goody called ultimogeniture "Borough English" and primogeniture "Borough French" because in England ultimogeniture was a native custom, while primogeniture was a custom brought by the Norman invaders. According to Goody, in Late Medieval England, patrilineal primogeniture predominated in feudal tenures and among the peasantry of large parts of the Midlands. Patrilineal ultimogeniture ("Borough English") prevailed elsewhere in the champion country. Partible inheritance (gavelkind) prevailed in Kent, East Anglia and the Celtic areas.

Both preferential primogeniture and preferential ultimogeniture were practiced in pre-revolutionary Russia, where the eldest son succeeded as family head and inherited more than the other sons. "The youngest son, if he remained with the father, inherited the house and also at times other property" (minorat). However, the share of land and moveables of the other sons was only slightly smaller than that of the eldest and the youngest son. Only in the southern part of the country was the house inherited by the youngest son; in the north it was inherited by the eldest son.

The Russian family of around 1900 considered property such as the house, agricultural implements, livestock and produce as belonging collectively to all family members. When the father died, his role as head of the family (known as Khozain, or Bolshak ) was passed to the oldest person in the house. In some areas this was the oldest son. In others it was the oldest brother of the deceased so long as he lived in the same house. There were some areas were a new head would be elected by the family members. If all surviving members of the family were under age, a relation would become a co-proprietor. If property was divided after a death, each adult male in the house got an equal share. Sons who had left home did not have a right of succession. Females remained within the family and received a share of the inheritance when they married. In the north of Russia, the oldest son inherited the house. In the south the eldest son would have set up a separate house while the father was still alive, therefore the youngest inherited the fathers house upon his death.

== Systems of inheritance among various people ==
Throughout history, creative inheritance systems have been created, fitting the best needs of the various people according to their unique environment and challenges.

== Inheritance customs as a cultural dimension ==
Inheritance customs do not follow clear ethnic, linguistic or geographical patterns. Equality between all sons and a subordinate position of women, with the exclusion of daughters from inheriting, are prominent aspects of Hungarian, Albanian, Romanian, Armenian, and most Slavic or Latin American cultures. While many studies show the privileged position that the eldest son traditionally enjoyed in Slovene, Finnish or Tibetan culture. The Jaintia, the Garo and the Khasi, on the other hand, traditionally privileged the youngest daughter. Some peoples, like the Dinka, the Arakanese, the Chins of Myanmar, or the Karen, frequently show a compromise between primogeniture and ultimogeniture in their inheritance patterns. Although among many Chins of Myanmar, the advantage that the eldest and the youngest son have over other sons is really small, so it is not correct to speak of a true pattern of mixed primogeniture and ultimogeniture. The advantage of the eldest and the youngest son is somewhat more ample among the Dinka and the Arakanese. The compromise between primogeniture and ultimogeniture was also found among the Kachin and the Dilling, as well as among the Sherpa to some degree. This pattern of inheritance is also reported for many Fulbe villages in the Republic of Guinea, though it seems that in past times the eldest son inherited all in Guinea.

Sometimes inheritance customs do not entirely reflect social traditions. Romans valued sons more than daughters, and Thais and Shan showed the reverse pattern, though all practiced equal land inheritance between all children. The Shan people, who live mostly in northern Thailand and northeastern Myanmar, are markedly matrilocal.

In Han Chinese tradition, the eldest son was of special importance. The law punished more harshly offences by a younger brother against an elder brother than vice versa. The eldest son received the family headship in cases where the family held together as a single unit, and the largest share in cases of family division, since he also inherited the cult to family ancestors. This is still practiced in Taiwan nowadays, though Chinese peasants have practiced partible inheritance since the time of the Qin and Han Dynasties, when the previous system of male primogeniture was abolished. In some cases, the eldest son of the eldest son, rather than the eldest son, was favored. Ritual primogeniture was emphasized in the lineage organizations of North China. During the Longshan culture period and the period of the three Dynasties (Xia, Zhou and Shang), patrilineal primogeniture predominated.

Among Mongols it has been usually stated that the youngest son had a special position because he cared for his parents in their old age. On their death he inherited the parental tent, which was connected with the religious cult in Mongol traditions, though all sons received more or less equal shares of livestock as they married. However, in contrast to this popularly held notion, more rigorous and substantiated anthropological studies of kinship and family in central Asian peoples strongly indicate that in these societies elder sons and their lines of descent had higher status than younger sons and their lines of descent. In central Asia, all members of a lineage were terminologically distinguished by generation and age, with senior superior to junior. The lineage structure of central Asia had three different modes: genealogical distance, or the proximity of individuals to one another on a graph of kinship; generational distance, or the rank of generation in relation to a common ancestor; and birth order, the rank of brothers in relation to each another. The paternal descent lines were collaterally ranked according to the birth of their founders, and were thus considered senior and junior to each other. Of the various collateral patrilines, the senior in order of descent from the founding ancestor, the line of eldest sons, was the most noble. In the steppe, no one had his exact equal; everyone found his place in a system of collaterally ranked lines of descent from a common ancestor. It was according to this idiom of superiority and inferiority of lineages derived from birth order that legal claims to superior rank were couched. Furthermore, at least among Mongols, the elder son inherited more than the younger son, and this is mandated by law codes such as the Yassa, created by Genghis Khan.

Among Arabic peoples, it is sometimes argued that the expansion of Islam brought an end to the sharp distinction between the firstborn and other sons so characteristic of ancient Semitic peoples. However, many peoples who have partially or completely embraced Islam, have also established inequality between sons, such as the Oromo of east Africa, who had patrilineal primogeniture in inheritance, in spite of the fact that some of them were Muslim. Other Muslim peoples, like the Minangkabau and the Javanese of Indonesia, the Turks, or the Fur in Sudan, also have inheritance practices that contradict their Islamic beliefs. Most non-Arab Muslims historically followed their own inheritance customs, not those of the Sharia.

In India, inheritance customs were (and still are) very diverse. Patrilineal primogeniture predominated in ancient times. The Laws of Manu state that the oldest son inherits all of the father's estate. Since the Middle Ages patrilineal equal inheritance has prevailed in perhaps a majority of groups, although the eldest son often received an extra share. Under this system, the estate would be shared between all sons, but these would often remain together with their respective families under the headship of the karta or family head, who was usually the eldest son of the previous family head. However, among some South Asian peoples, such as the Western Punjabi, male primogeniture continued to prevail.

== Fertility and marriage strategies across diverse societies ==
=== Cross-cultural comparisons ===
The practice of widow inheritance by younger brothers has been observed in many parts of Africa and the Asian steppe, as well as small zones of South Asia. This practice forces younger brothers to marry older women. Eastern European cultures, on the other hand, are characterized by early, universal and equal access to marriage and reproduction, due to their systems of equal inheritance of land and movable property by all sons. Research on pre-industrial Russian Karelia however, suggests that younger brothers frequently remained unmarried, and the joint-family household characterized by the equal inheritance of land and moveable property by all sons and patriarchal power relations wasn't universal in Russia.

The patrilineal joint-family systems and more or less equal inheritance for all son in India and China meant that there was no difference in marriage and reproduction due to birth order. In the stem-family systems of Northwest Europe however, access to marriage and reproduction wasn't equal for all sons, since only one of them would inherit most or all of the land.

The survival and well-being of children in India and China is positively influenced by the number of older siblings of the opposite sex and negatively influenced by the number of older siblings of the same sex. However, definitive celibacy was historically relatively uncommon in India and China, but relatively common in many European societies where inheritance was impartible. The Han Chinese first sons historically married earlier, had lower rates of definitive celibacy and more children (especially males) than their younger brothers. However, they suffered higher mortality rates. This has been attributed to the fact that eldest sons needed to have more children to succeed them as heads and were willing to take more risks and suffer a higher drain of resources to achieve this. The Chinese joint family system had strong inegalitarian traits that made it demographically more akin to a stem family system. According to Emmanuel Todd and others, it be reminiscent of the system of patrilineal primogeniture prevalent during the Longshan culture period and the period of the Three Dynasties.

=== Variations by class and context ===
There is a strong relationship between fertility and inheritance in "Malthusian" contexts of resource scarcity. In contexts where resources are plentiful, the relationship between inheritance and social outcomes can be different. In the Midwest and Northeast United States during the period from 1775 to 1875, where resources were plentiful, being the first son was positively correlated with wealth and fertility. As in other western cultures, but unlike European societies where resources were scarce, this has a complex relationship with inheritance.

Inheritance practices and seniority of patriline, as well as the importance of inheritance itself, have varied over time among the Lisu. This was mostly in response to changes in resource availability and poppy cultivation.

In the United States, daughters currently inherit on average more than sons. In the past, however, the eldest son was favored in matters of land inheritance. During the Colonial Period, the eldest son inherited twice more than the other sons in the northern colonies (these inheritance laws were modelled on Mosaic Law), and in the southern colonies there was a rule of male primogeniture.

In northern Ghana, a region where male primogeniture predominates, rich households favoured sons over daughters. It is likely that first born sons would have been preferred as they would inherit the wealth and therefore have higher reproductive prospects.

== Cultural patterns of child-preference ==
In recent times inheritance in the western world has generally been egalitarian despite parents showing favoritism towards daughters and later-born sons. In parent-son relationships, mothers usually show favouritism towards the first son and fathers to later born sons however these tendencies have lost much of their importance with regards to inheritance.

Customs of ultimogeniture among farmers has been explained as a consequence of postponing retirement so they do not feel "dethroned" early by their eldest son. This line of thinking has been linked to the preeminence of lastborn siblings in popular myth and folklore around the world. As a consequence, in some cultures that practice male preimogentiure there are ambiguous, contradictory feelings towards last born sons.

Among the Hausa of West Africa, who practice primogeniture, the mother and oldest son engage in mutual avoidance behavior to mark the woman's positive change in status upon producing an heir. The father may also avoid the son if he is the mother's first male child, speaking to him through intermediaries rather than directly.

Among the Mossi of central Burkina Faso in West Africa, the eldest son would be sent to relatives shortly after circumcision and return to the parental household shortly after puberty; after the death of his father he would inherit his property.

A study of the people of the Pacific island Tikopia in 1929 found that the eldest son must marry and receive more land, while the younger sons remain bachelors, emigrate or even die. However, by 1952 many of the customs were being abandoned and marriage was beginning to become universal. In the succession to chieftainship, the traditional custom of male primogeniture continued though.

In some societies in Sub-Saharan Africa where male primogeniture was practiced, tensions between parents and their inheriting eldest son were resolved through rituals of avoidance. This was most extreme among the Tallensi. Among East Asian peoples, on the other hand, co-residence between parents and their eldest son was thought of as normal and desirable in systems of impartible inheritance, and in some countries such as Japan, Vietnam and South Korea it is widely practiced even nowadays. Historically in Japan, marriage and reproduction by the eldest son was facilitated by their status as heirs.

In Japan, Korea and Vietnam, as well as in some of those European regions where male primogeniture was practiced, parents didn't transfer their property to the inheriting son at the point of his marriage as among Germans. Instead, the first son remained under his father's authority even after he had married and had had children, and the father remained the nominal head of the family until his death, relinquishing his actual authority slowly and gradually. In Japan, only the inheriting son stayed in the parental household. He could become head of the family any time between his marriage and the death of his predecessor. The timing of this was normally dictated by familial or local traditions. The Catalan and Occitan stem families in Europe closely resembled the model seen in Japan.

In rural China, property and landholdings are usually divided up when the older son marries. Normally the youngest son continues to live with the parents and inherits their remaining share of the property. Prior to the revolution in 1949, most families in rural areas of China stayed together for many years after the oldest son marries, sometimes until the youngest son married. However, there is some evidence that the practice of co-residing with the eldest son continues.

In Israel, coresidence between parents and their eldest son prevails in the context of the Moshav movement, that prohibited breaking up family plots; thus the eldest son inherits the family farm.

In South Korea, modern businesses (chaebol) are handed down according to male primogeniture in most cases. A study of family firms in the UK, France, Germany and US found that male primogeniture was the inheritance rule in more than half of family firms in France and the UK, but only in less than a third of those in the US and only in a quarter (25 per cent) of those in Germany.

== Social approaches to inheritance customs ==
Employing differing forms of succession can affect many areas of society. Gender roles are profoundly affected by inheritance laws and traditions. Impartible inheritance has the effect of keeping large estates united and thus perpetuating an elite. With partible inheritance large estates are slowly divided among many descendants and great wealth is thus diluted. Inheritance customs can even affect gender differences in cognitive abilities. Among the Karbis, who employ male primogeniture, men perform significantly better than women in tasks of spatial abilities. There are no significant differences in the performance of men and women among the Khasis, who employ female ultimogeniture.

The degree of acceptance that a society may show towards an inheritance rule can also vary. In South Africa, for example, the influence of more modern, western social ideas has caused strong opposition, both civil and official, to the customary law of patrilineal primogeniture traditionally prevalent among black peoples, and inheritance customs are gradually changing.

Among the indigenous tribes of South Africa, the oldest son inherits after the death of the father. If the oldest son is also dead, the oldest surviving grandson inherits; if the eldest son has no sons, the inheritance is passed to the father's second son or his sons, and so on through all the sons and their male children if necessary. In polygynous families which were formed of multiple units, the inheritance rules were changed slightly. Each marriage formed a new unit, independent from the others, with separate property which was inherited by the heir of each unit. Polygynous families practised either simple or complex inheritance. In the simple system the heir is the eldest son of the first wife, or if he is dead, the eldest grandson. If the first wife had no sons, the inheritance went to the oldest surviving male descendant of the second wife, and so on through all the wives if necessary. Complex inheritance happened when the homestead was separated into two or three units, depending on the number of wives, and the eldest son of each wife became heir of their unit. If there was no heir in one of the units, the heir of the other inherited both. This form of inheritance was seen among the Xhosa people of south eastern South Africa.

In Lesotho and southern Ethiopia, most people still follow the custom of male primogeniture. However, in Zambia, Namibia and Cameroon, the prevalent customary law of patrilineal primogeniture is beginning to be challenged in court. In eastern Democratic Republic of Congo, the predominant custom of male primogeniture is also beginning to be considered unfair by some women and younger sons. The custom of patrilineal primogeniture predominant in South Sudan, Uganda, Tanzania, Burundi, Equatorial Guinea, Zimbabwe and Gambia have not caused much opposition.

In Ghana, the diverse inheritance customs across ethnic groups, such as the male primogeniture among the Ewe and the Krobos, or matrilineal inheritance among the Akan, contribute to the occurrence of children living in the streets. In Sierra Leone, the inheritance customs prevalent in the country, were either the eldest son or the eldest brother inherits the property, create insecurities for widows. In South Korea, favouring the eldest son has been predominant almost up to recent times, despite laws of equal inheritance for all children. In 2005, in more than half (52.6 per cent) cases of inheritance the eldest son inherited most or all of his parents' property; in more than 30 per cent of cases the eldest son inherited all of his parents' property. In the past North Korea has the same pattern of inheritance as the South, however no details about current inheritance practices have been available since the county's proclamation of independence in 1948.

Social transformations can also modify inheritance customs to a great extent. For example, the Samburu of north-central Kenya are pastoralists who have traditionally practiced an attenuated form of patrilineal primogeniture, with the eldest son receiving the largest share of the family herd and each succeeding son receiving a considerably smaller share than any of his seniors. Now that many of them have become agriculturalists, some argue that land inheritance should follow patrilineal primogeniture, while others argue for equal division of the land. The Bhil people of central India, who were hunter-gatherers in the past, adopted a system of attenuated patrilineal primogeniture identical to that of pastoral Samburu when they became agriculturalists. The same custom also prevails among some other peoples, like the Elgeyo and Maasai in Kenya, or the Nupe of Nigeria and Niger. Most of the Amhara in Ethiopia divide their property between all sons, however male primogeniture is practised in some regions. Favoring the eldest son is also common among the Dinka in South Sudan. Among the Shona of Zimbabwe and Mozambique, the oldest son it the first to inherit and gets the best piece of the land. The oldest accounts of the Shona mention patrilineal primogeniture as their inheritance custom, with the oldest son of any of the deceased's wives becoming the main heir. The widow was inherited by her husbands brother but could choose not to be.

== The evolution of inheritance practices in Europe ==
The right of patrilineal primogeniture, though widespread during medieval and modern times in Europe, doesn't seem to have prevailed so extensively in ancient times. In Athens, according to Demosthenes and the Laws of Solon, the eldest son inherited the house and with it the cult to family ancestors. Aristotle spoke about patrilineal primogeniture during his time in Thebes and Corinth. He also spoke about the revolts that put an end to it in Massalia, Istros, Heraclea and Cnido). While Aristotle was opposed to this right, Plato wanted it to become more widespread. However, the nature of inheritance practices in Ancient Sparta is hotly debated among scholars. Ancient Greeks also considered the eldest son the avenger of wrongs done to parents—"The Erinyes are always at the command of the first-born".

Roman law didn't recognise primogeniture, but in practice Romans favored the eldest son. In Ancient Persia, succession to the family headship was determined by patrilineal primogeniture.

Among Celtic and Germanic peoples, the predominant custom during ancient times seems to have been to divide the land in equal parts for each of the sons. However, the house could be left to only one of them. Evidence of actual practices and law codes such as the Sachsenspiegel indicate that Germans left the house to the youngest son. This was possibly connected to the cult to family ancestors, which was also inherited by the youngest son. Celts from Ireland and northern France left the house to the eldest son. Both Germans and Irish divided the land into equal shares until the early modern Age, when impartible inheritance gradually took hold among both peoples. However, according to Tacitus the German tribe of the Tencteri employed patrilineal primogeniture. There is also evidence that in Schleswig Holstein, leaving the estate to the eldest son and giving only monetary compensation to his siblings was the prevailing practice since around the year 100. Patrilineal primogeniture also prevailed among the Vikings. In Scotland, certain types of property descended exclusively to the eldest son in the Scottish Lowlands even before the Norman conquest in 1066. Patrilineal primogeniture with regards to all types of immoveable property became the legal rule in all of Scotland during the reign of William I (1165–1214). Until 1868, all immovable property, also called in Scottish law "heritable property" (buildings, lands, etc.) was inherited exclusively by the eldest son and couldn't be included in a will. After 1868, it could be included in a will or testament, but if a person died intestate, it was still inherited exclusively by the eldest son. In 1964, this rule of male primogeniture in cases of intestacy was finally abolished. According to Bede, the custom in Northumbria reserved a substantial birthright for the eldest son even before the Norman conquest and other local customs of inheritance also gave certain additional benefits to the eldest son. After the Norman conquest, male primogeniture became widespread throughout England, becoming the common law with the signing of Magna Carta in 1215, only slightly later than in Scotland. After 1540, a testator could dispose of its immovable property as he saw fit with the use of a testament, but until 1925 it was still inherited solely by the eldest son if he died intestate. However, although the gentry and the nobility in England practiced a relatively strict form of male primogeniture, there was no clearly prevalent inheritance pattern among peasants, giving rise to a sort of "proto-capitalist" rural economy, the "absolute nuclear" family. During Late Medieval Times male ultimogeniture ("Borough-English") was the predominant custom in England, as it was the customary rule of inheritance among unfree peasants, and this social class comprised most of the population according to the Domesday Book. In Scotland, by contrast, a strict form of male primogeniture prevailed (and still prevails) even among peasants.

The Scottish clan of the feudal era, which survived in the Highlands until 1747, was the only known example of a conical clan in Europe, along with the Roman gens according to Fustel de Coulanges. As Gartmore says in a paper written in 1747, "The property of these Highlands belongs to a great many different persons, who are more or less considerable in proportion to the extent of their estates, and to the command of men that live upon them, or follow them on account of their clanship, out of the estates of others. These lands are set by the landlord during pleasure, or a short tack, to people whom they call good-men, and who are of a superior station to the commonality. These are generally the sons, brothers, cousins, or nearest relations of the landlord. The younger sons of families are not bred to any business or employments, but are sent to the French or Spanish armies, or marry as soon as they are of age. Those are left to their own good fortune and conduct abroad, and these are preferred to some advantageous farm at home. This, by the means of a small portion, and the liberality of their relations, they are able to stock, and which they, their children, and grandchildren, possess at an easy rent, till a nearer descendant be again preferred to it. As the propinquity removes, they become less considered, till at last they degenerate to be of the common people; unless some accidental acquisition of wealth supports them above their station. As this hath been an ancient custom, most of the farmers and cottars are of the name and clan of the proprietor; and, if they are not really so, the proprietor either obliges them to assume it, or they are glaid to do so, to procure his protection and favour."

Prior to the advent of feudalism during Late Medieval times and the creation of the system above explained, no trace of male primogeniture or a similar custom existed in Scotland or elsewhere in the Celtic world. The successor to the office of the chief was selected among the wider kin of the previous chief (tanistry), and the land, among common families, was divided between all sons. Among many ancient Germanic tribes, on the other hand, male primogeniture determined succession to political office, the eldest son of a chief customarily succeeding his father. The common rule of land inheritance was partible inheritance, as in the Celtic world.

The British custom of male primogeniture became also prevalent in some British colonies, most strongly in Australia. The contrary development occurred in South Africa, where the Afrikaner colonizers, who practiced partible inheritance, were always opposed to the custom of male primogeniture prevalent among indigenous black peoples. In New Zealand, European colonizers chose any son to succeed to the family farm, without regards to his fraternal birth order, while patrilineal primogeniture prevailed among the indigenous Maori people.

In parts of northern France, giving a slightly larger share to the eldest son was common among peasants even before the 10th century; after that century, patrilineal primogeniture developed among the nobility (impartible inheritance never obtained among peasants in most of northern France). Flanders was probably the first country where patrilineal primogeniture became predominant among aristocrats. By the time of the French Revolution it had become almost universal in this social class in western, central and northern Europe, but inheritance customs among peasants varied widely across regions.

Strabo also speaks about customs of male primogeniture among Iberian peoples (most of the Iberian peninsula was populated by then by Celtic or half-Celtic peoples, not Iberians proper). He mentions that among the Cantabrii, however, the eldest child regardless of sex inherited the family property. By the term "Cantabrii" he was most probably referring not to the actual Cantabrians but to the Basques (who were not an Iberian people); among the Basques of France, this usage survived until the French Revolution, long after it had been replaced by male primogeniture or free selection of an heir among the Basques of Spain. In Catalonia, in northeastern Spain, the custom of male primogeniture survived in an exceptionally vigorous form among peasants until very recent times (in northeastern Catalonia, for example, peasants rigorously respected the right of male primogeniture until very recent times. In the province of Lleida, too, even as late as the mid-twentieth century, only 7.11 percent of the sons who became single-heirs were not the first son. In central and southern Catalonia, male primogeniture was also predominant). However, in other past Iberian regions which were subject to greater Muslim influence, such as Valencia, this custom only survived in some areas.

=== Welsh laws of inheritance ===
The ancient Welsh laws of inheritance inform us about the evolution of inheritance practices in Great Britain. The Venedotian Code establishes that land must be partitioned between all sons and that the youngest has a preferential claim to the buildings:

"If there be buildings, the youngest brother but one is to divide the tyddyns,* for in that case he is the meter; and the youngest to have his choice of the tyddyns, and after that he is to divide all the patrimony. And by seniority they are to choose unto the youngest; and that division is to continue during the lives of the brothers."

"If there be no buildings on the land, the youngest son is to divide all the patrimony, and the eldest is to choose; and each, in seniority, choose unto the youngest."

"Land of a hamlet is not to be shared as tyddyns, but as gardens; and if there be buildings thereon, the youngest son is not more entitled to them than the eldest, but they are to be shared as chambers."

"When brothers share their patrimony between them, the younger is to have the principal tenement, and all the buildings, of his father, and eight einvs of land; his boiler, his hatchet, and his coulter, because a father cannot give these three to any one but the youngest son, and though they should be pledged they never become forfeited. Then let every brother take an homestead with eight erws of land; and the youngest son is to divide, and they are to choose in succession from the eldest to the youngest."

This was later replaced by a preference for the eldest son, and the Dimetian Code provides:

Whoever shall have dadenhudd adjudged to him, no one, by law, can eject him therefrom, except a proprietary heir to dadenhudd, according to age, that is, the eldest; since the second dadenhudd cannot eject the first; and one non-proprietor cannot eject another non-proprietor. If there be a dispute between two lawful heirs, one is proprietary heir to the dadenhudd of the whole, and another is non-proprietor; the one, however, is proprietor to dadenhudd of the whole, as dadenhudd of the whole is not appropriate to any one, but to the eldest of all the brothers. The privilege of age of the eldest brother renders all the younger brothers non-proprietors, and renders him sole proprietor for dadenhudd of all; if the younger ones come before him to obtain dadenhudd, at what time soever may come, he is to eject them all, and is to obtain dadenhudd of the whole: if they make the demand jointly, they are to obtain it jointly, as has been mentioned above. The eldest brother is likewise a primary son, and the youngest is secondary in claim; and therefore it is said: the second dadenhudd cannot eject the first. All the younger brothers are non-proprietors, as to obtaining dadenhudd of the whole, although every one shall obtain his share; and on that account it is said: no non-proprietor can eject another non-proprietor.

Canon law-dictated patrilineal primogeniture:

The ecclesiastical law says again that no son is to have the patrimony but the eldest born to the father by the married wife. The law of Howel, however, adjudges it to the younger son as well as to the oldest, and decides that the sin of the father, or his illegal act, is not to be brought against the son as to lus patrimony.

During the Modern Age, many Welsh peasants in upland areas lived in stem families where the eldest son took over the farm when his father became old. Perhaps most intriguingly, in the inner, lowland areas of Wales, where English culture was stronger and absolute nuclear families on the English model prevailed, male ultimogeniture predominated.

=== The fideicommissum ===
Inheritance can be organized in a way that its use is restricted by the desires of someone (usually of the decedent). An inheritance may have been organized as a fideicommissum, which usually cannot be sold or diminished, only its profits are disposable. A fideicommissum's succession can also be ordered in a way that determines it long (or eternally) also with regard to persons born long after the original descendant. Royal succession has typically been more or less a fideicommissum, the realm not (easily) to be sold and the rules of succession not to be (easily) altered by a holder (a monarch). The fideicommissum, which in fact had little resemblance to the Roman institution of the same name, was almost the standard method of property transfer among the European nobility; Austria, Germany, Switzerland, Bohemia, Sweden and Italy were some of the countries where it became very popular among wealthy landowners, beginning in most cases around the early modern Age. It was almost always organized around principles of male primogeniture. The Spanish mayorazgo and the Portuguese morgado also resembled the Continental fideicommissum more than the noble customs of Great Britain and most French regions; noble customs of primogeniture in these countries were more ancient and thus took different legal forms. Inheritance of noble titles also distinguished Great Britain from Continental Europe, since in most European countries most noble titles (though not estates) were inherited by all sons, sometimes even all children.
