= Akha Expedition =

The Akha Expedition was a military expedition in India's north-east frontier in 1883–84.
