= List of Roman villas in England =

A list of Roman villas in England confirmed by archaeology.

== Bedfordshire ==
Name	Location	Grid reference	PastScape link	Notes
Colworth	Colworth House	SP971603	Historic England. "Monument No. 346800". Research records (formerly PastScape).	Dug by archaeological television programme Time Team 2009
Totternhoe	Totternhoe	SP98932080	Historic England. "Monument No. 346563". Research records (formerly PastScape).	

== Berkshire ==
Name	Location	Grid reference	PastScape link	Notes
Aldermaston Wharf	Aldermaston Wharf	SU605681	Historic England. "Aldermaston Wharf (240982)". Research records (formerly PastScape).	Bath house only
Basildon	Lower Basildon	SU60797929	Historic England. "Monument No. 241288". Research records (formerly PastScape).	Dug by Time Team 2000
Birch Farm	Marlston	SU529738	Historic England. "Monument No. 237393". Research records (formerly PastScape).	
Cox Green	Cox Green	SU86877979	Historic England. "Cox Green (247961)". Research records (formerly PastScape).	
Eling Farm	Yattendon	SU53237523	Historic England. "Monument No. 237286". Research records (formerly PastScape).	
Kintbury	Kintbury	SU39416715	Historic England. "Monument No. 228668". Research records (formerly PastScape).	Bath house only
Maddle Farm	Upper Lambourn	SU301828	Historic England. "Maddle Farm (229360)". Research records (formerly PastScape).	
Maidenhatch	Pangbourne	SU61757378	Historic England. "Monument No. 241612". Research records (formerly PastScape).	
Maidenhead	Maidenhead	SU88068110	Historic England. "Monument No. 248410". Research records (formerly PastScape).	
Well House Farm	Hermitage	SU52347258	Historic England. "Monument No. 237389". Research records (formerly PastScape).	

== Buckinghamshire ==
Name	Location	Grid reference	PastScape link	Notes
Bancroft	Milton Keynes (Stantonbury CP)	SP82714036	Historic England. "Monument No. 345174". Research records (formerly PastScape).	Excavated and covered. Mosaic floor on display in Milton Keynes Shopping Centre
Foxcote	Foscott	SP72233530	Historic England. "Monument No. 342930". Research records (formerly PastScape).	
Hambleden	Hambleden	SU78398554	Historic England. "Monument No. 245181". Research records (formerly PastScape).	
Hambleden	Hambleden	SU78638483	Historic England. "Monument No. 245271". Research records (formerly PastScape).	
High Wycombe	High Wycombe	SU87409239	Historic England. "Monument No. 248726". Research records (formerly PastScape).	
Latimer	Latimer	SU99779852	Historic England. "Monument No. 251990". Research records (formerly PastScape).	
Lavendon	Lavendon	SP90895409	Historic England. "Monument No. 346970". Research records (formerly PastScape).	
Mursley	Mursley	SP83263038	Historic England. "Monument No. 344806". Research records (formerly PastScape).	
Saunderton	Saunderton	SP79710190	Historic England. "Monument No. 342603". Research records (formerly PastScape).	
Stanton Low	Milton Keynes (Stantonbury CP)	SP841430	Historic England. "Monument No. 345100". Research records (formerly PastScape).	Destroyed by gravel extraction.
Thornton	Thornton	SP75653672	Historic England. "Monument No. 342881". Research records (formerly PastScape).	

== Cambridgeshire ==
Name	Location	Grid reference	PastScape link	Notes
Barnack	Barnack	TF08030663	Historic England. "Monument No. 347802". Research records (formerly PastScape).	
Bartlow	Bartlow	TL58724499	Historic England. "Monument No. 374140". Research records (formerly PastScape).	
Castor	Castor	TL12609725	Historic England. "Monument No. 364439". Research records (formerly PastScape).	
Comberton	Comberton	TL38455489	Historic England. "Monument No. 368941". Research records (formerly PastScape).	
Croydon	Croydon	TL324483	Historic England. "Monument No. 368572". Research records (formerly PastScape).	
Fordham	Fordham	TL635684	Historic England. "Monument No. 377396". Research records (formerly PastScape).	
Godmanchester	Godmanchester	TL257713	Historic England. "Monument No. 366565". Research records (formerly PastScape).	
Great Wilbraham	Great Wilbraham	TL55825763	Historic England. "Monument No. 1095800". Research records (formerly PastScape).	
Guilden Morden	Guilden Morden	TL27634054	Historic England. "Monument No. 365953". Research records (formerly PastScape).	
Helpston	Helpston	TF12370408	Historic England. "Monument No. 350328". Research records (formerly PastScape).	
Huntingdon	Huntingdon	TL23667138	Historic England. "Monument No. 366748". Research records (formerly PastScape).	
Ickleton	Ickleton	TL496431	Historic England. "Monument No. 371050". Research records (formerly PastScape).	
Itter Crescent	Walton, Peterborough	TF182020		Excavated in 2014
Linton	Linton	TL57594615	Historic England. "Monument No. 374014". Research records (formerly PastScape).	
Litlington	Litlington	TL31264247	Historic England. "Monument No. 368682". Research records (formerly PastScape).	Dug by Time Team 2010
Orton Longueville	Orton Longueville	TL176956	Historic England. "Monument No. 364221". Research records (formerly PastScape).	
Pilsgate	Barnack	TF05670651	Historic England. "Monument No. 347808". Research records (formerly PastScape).	
Reach	Reach	TL57266518	Historic England. "Monument No. 374665". Research records (formerly PastScape).	
Rushey Farm	Great Staughton	TL13466304	Historic England. "Monument No. 363484". Research records (formerly PastScape).	
Sacrewell Lodge	Thornhaugh	TF07630046	Historic England. "Monument No. 348090". Research records (formerly PastScape).	
Teversham	Teversham	TL49965752	Historic England. "Monument No. 371259". Research records (formerly PastScape).	
Water Newton	Water Newton	TL111973	Historic England. "Monument No. 364448". Research records (formerly PastScape).; Historic England. "Monument No. 364445". Research records (formerly PastScape).	

== Cheshire ==
Name	Location	Grid reference	PastScape link	Notes
Vale Royal	Eaton	SJ571634	Historic England. "Monument No. 71430". Research records (formerly PastScape).	

== Cornwall ==
Name	Location	Grid reference	PastScape link	Notes
Magor	Illogan	SW63674235	Historic England. "Magor Villa (426186)". Research records (formerly PastScape).	

== Derbyshire ==
Name	Location	Grid reference	PastScape link	Notes
Carsington by Wirksworth	Carsington Water	SK24925166	Historic England. "Monument No. 607068". Research records (formerly PastScape).	

== Devon ==
Name	Location	Grid reference	PastScape link	Notes
Downes	Downes, Crediton	SX85049920	Historic England. "Monument No. 918313". Research records (formerly PastScape).	
Holcombe	Holcombe	SY31499281	Historic England. "Monument No. 449785". Research records (formerly PastScape).	
Honeyditchesgh	Seatonl,	SY238909	Historic England. "Monument No. 449679". Research records (formerly PastScape).	

== Dorset ==
Name	Location	Grid reference	PastScape link	Notes
Brenscombe Farm	Corfe Castle	SY97898272	Historic England. "Monument No. 456839". Research records (formerly PastScape).	
Bucknowle Farm	Corfe Castle	SY95368146	Historic England. "Monument No. 456872". Research records (formerly PastScape).	
Dewlish	Dewlish	SY76789720	Historic England. "Monument No. 454480". Research records (formerly PastScape).	
Druce Farm	Puddletown	SY7496		Excavated by East Dorset Antiquarian Society 2012–2015
East Creech	East Creech	SY93478277	Historic England. "Monument No. 456920". Research records (formerly PastScape).	
Farnham	Farnham	ST9615	Historic England. "Monument No. 209791". Research records (formerly PastScape).	
Fifehead Neville	Fifehead Neville	ST77281121	Historic England. "Monument No. 202262". Research records (formerly PastScape).	
Frampton	Frampton	SY61589528	Historic England. "Frampton (453174)". Research records (formerly PastScape).	
Halstock	Halstock	ST53380757	Historic England. "Halstock Roman Villa (195721)". Research records (formerly PastScape).	Mosaic discovered in 1817-8 and destroyed shortly after by vandals.
Hemsworth	Witchampton	ST96320587	Historic England. "Monument No. 209284". Research records (formerly PastScape).	
Hinton St Mary	Hinton St Mary	ST78451602	Historic England. "Monument No. 202177". Research records (formerly PastScape).	
Iwerne	Iwerne Minster	ST85691375	Historic England. "Monument No. 206061". Research records (formerly PastScape).	
Lenthay	Sherborne	ST62451529	Historic England. "Monument No. 199497". Research records (formerly PastScape).	
Myncen Farm	Gussage St Andrew	ST973143	Historic England. "Monument No. 912528". Research records (formerly PastScape).	Dug by Time Team 2003
Preston	Preston	SY70298270	Historic England. "Monument No. 454283". Research records (formerly PastScape).	
Tarrant Hinton	Tarrant Hinton	ST92591194	Historic England. "Tarrant Hinton (210228)". Research records (formerly PastScape).	
Thornford	Thornford	ST59451363	Historic England. "Monument No. 196188". Research records (formerly PastScape).	
Walls Field	Charminster	SY66729492	Historic England. "Monument No. 453248". Research records (formerly PastScape).	
Wynford Eagle	Wynford Eagle	SY575952	Historic England. "Monument No. 450700". Research records (formerly PastScape).	

== Essex ==
Name	Location	Grid reference	PastScape link	Notes
Alresford	Alresford	TM06091993	Historic England. "Monument No. 385970". Research records (formerly PastScape).	
Ashdon	Ashdon	TL57784347	Historic England. "Monument No. 374158". Research records (formerly PastScape).	
Brightlingsea	Brightlingsea	TM05881872	Historic England. "Monument No. 385972". Research records (formerly PastScape).	
Chignall	Chignal St James	TL66251086	Historic England. "Monument No. 376080". Research records (formerly PastScape).	
Finchingfield	Finchingfield	TL668337	Historic England. "Monument No. 376680". Research records (formerly PastScape).	
Finchingfield	Finchingfield	TL69053256	Historic England. "Monument No. 376691". Research records (formerly PastScape).	
Fryerning	Fryerning	TL646018	Historic England. "Monument No. 375861". Research records (formerly PastScape).	
Gestingthorpe	Gestingthorpe	TL827386	Historic England. "Monument No. 381671". Research records (formerly PastScape).	
Great Tey	Great Tey	TL88922546	Historic England. "Monument No. 381346". Research records (formerly PastScape).	
Hallingbury	Little Hallingbury	TL49221638	Historic England. "Monument No. 369973". Research records (formerly PastScape).	
Harlow	Harlow	TL48091255	Historic England. "Monument No. 1084331". Research records (formerly PastScape).	
Little Dunmow	Little Dunmow	TL664212	Historic England. "Monument No. 376402". Research records (formerly PastScape).	
Little Oakley	Little Oakley	TM223290	Historic England. "Monument No. 389512". Research records (formerly PastScape).	
Mucking	Mucking	TQ673804	Historic England. "Monument No. 1302380". Research records (formerly PastScape).	
Park Farm	Abberton	TL994203	Historic England. "Monument No. 384123". Research records (formerly PastScape).	
Pleshey	Pleshey	TL65101435	Historic England. "Monument No. 376028". Research records (formerly PastScape).	
Rivenhall	Rivenhall	TL82971784	Historic England. "Monument No. 381076". Research records (formerly PastScape).	
Ridgewell	Ridgewell	TL73304026	Historic England. "Monument No. 379420". Research records (formerly PastScape).	
Stebbing	Stebbing	TL67692446	Historic England. "Monument No. 376358". Research records (formerly PastScape).	
Stebbing Green	Stebbing	TL68852334	Historic England. "Monument No. 376366". Research records (formerly PastScape).	
Wendens Ambo	Wendens Ambo	TL508360	Historic England. "Monument No. 373695". Research records (formerly PastScape).	
West Mersea	West Mersea	TM00961251	Historic England. "Monument No. 386129". Research records (formerly PastScape).; Historic England. "Monument No. 386106". Research records (formerly PastScape).; Historic England. "Monument No. 386109". Research records (formerly PastScape).	

== Gloucestershire ==
Name	Location	Grid reference	PastScape link	Notes
Abbotswood	Lower Swell	SP18542624	Historic England. "Abbotswood Roman Villa (330160)". Research records (formerly PastScape).	
Ampney St Peter	Ampney St Peter	SP08050052	Historic England. "Monument No. 327315". Research records (formerly PastScape).	
Barnsley Park	Barnsley	SP08120617	Historic England. "Barnsley Park Villa (327163)". Research records (formerly PastScape).	
Barrington Park	Barrington	SP20411381	Historic England. "Barrington Park Villa (332433)". Research records (formerly PastScape).	
Bibury	Bibury	SP12220652	Historic England. "Bibury Villa (329710)". Research records (formerly PastScape).	
Boughspring	Boughspring	ST55969738	Historic England. "Boughspring Roman Villa (198716)". Research records (formerly PastScape).	
Brislington	Brislington	ST61647097	Historic England. "Monument No. 201401". Research records (formerly PastScape).	
Broadwell	Broadwell	SP19922802	Historic England. "Monument No. 330131". Research records (formerly PastScape).	
Chedworth	Chedworth	SP05271347	Historic England. "Chedworth Roman Villa (327592)". Research records (formerly PastScape).	
Cheyney Court	Upton Cheyney	ST695698	Historic England. "Monument No. 200843". Research records (formerly PastScape).	
Cirencester	Cirencester	SP01630232	Historic England. "Monument No. 327354". Research records (formerly PastScape).	
Clear Cupboard	Farmington	SP13231582	Historic England. "Clear Cupboard Roman Villa (329941)". Research records (formerly PastScape).	
Cold Harbour Farm	Wick	ST70667192	Historic England. "Monument No. 204952". Research records (formerly PastScape).	
Combend	Colesbourne	SO98411107	Historic England. "Combend Roman Villa (117505)". Research records (formerly PastScape).	
Compton Grove	Compton Abdale	SP04821624	Historic England. "Compton Grove Roman Villa (327505)". Research records (formerly PastScape).	
Ditches	Woodmancote	SO99590944	Historic England. "Ditches Hillfort (117102)". Research records (formerly PastScape).; Historic England. "Monument No. 1517772". Research records (formerly PastScape).	
Dryhill	Crickley Hill	SO93161688	Historic England. "Dryhill Villa (117453)". Research records (formerly PastScape).	
Eastleach	Eastleach	SP18900634	Historic England. "Monument No. 918537". Research records (formerly PastScape).	
Ebrington	Ebrington	SP18923999	Historic England. "Monument No. 330563". Research records (formerly PastScape).	
Frocester Court	Frocester	SO78490272	Historic England. "Frocester Court Roman Villa (113199)". Research records (formerly PastScape).	
Great Barrington	Barrington	SP21711324	Historic England. "Great Barrington Villa (332436)". Research records (formerly PastScape).	
Great Lemhill	Lechlade	SP21200249	Historic England. "Great Lemhill Villa (332221)". Research records (formerly PastScape).	
Great Rissington	Great Rissington	SP18941634	Historic England. "Monument No. 329866". Research records (formerly PastScape).	
Great Witcombe	Great Witcombe	SO89931424	Historic England. "Great Witcombe Roman Villa (115513)". Research records (formerly PastScape).	
Highfold	Painswick	SO85761021	Historic England. "Highfold Villa (115532)". Research records (formerly PastScape).	
Hocberry	Rodmarton	ST94439843	Historic England. "Hocberry Roman Villa (212790)". Research records (formerly PastScape).	
Hucclecote	Hucclecote	SO87691755	Historic England. "Hucclecote Roman Villa (115209)". Research records (formerly PastScape).	
Ironmongers Piece	Marshfield	ST79857602	Historic England. "Monument No. 204850". Research records (formerly PastScape).	
Kempsford	Kempsford	SU16809711	Historic England. "Monument No. 1010687". Research records (formerly PastScape).	
Kings Weston	Kings Weston	ST53397755	Historic England. "Monument No. 198239". Research records (formerly PastScape).	
Lechlade	Lechlade	SP21600087	Historic England. "Monument No. 332224". Research records (formerly PastScape).	
Lillyhorn	Bournes Green	SO91320438	Historic England. "Lillyhorn Roman Villa (117310)". Research records (formerly PastScape).	
Listercombe Bottom	Chedworth	SP07011174	Historic England. "Listercombe Bottom Roman Villa (327610)". Research records (formerly PastScape).	
Naunton	Naunton	SP131234	Historic England. "New Court Ground Villa (330507)". Research records (formerly PastScape).	
Park Farm	Aylburton	SO62500187	Historic England. "Park Farm (111684)". Research records (formerly PastScape).	
Priest Wood	Cromhall	ST68588974	Historic England. "Monument No. 201442". Research records (formerly PastScape).	
Shipton	Shipton	SP05471825	Historic England. "Monument No. 1509781". Research records (formerly PastScape).	
Spoonley Wood	Winchcombe	SP04502568	Historic England. "Spoonley Wood Roman Villa (327838)". Research records (formerly PastScape).	
St Peters Church	Frocester	SO77100327	Historic England. "St Peters Church (113220)". Research records (formerly PastScape).	
Stancombe	North Nibley	ST74139702	Historic England. "Monument No. 205263". Research records (formerly PastScape).; Historic England. "Monument No. 765386". Research records (formerly PastScape).	
The Chesters	Woolaston	ST597987	Historic England. "The Chesters (198703)". Research records (formerly PastScape).	
Tockington Park	Tockington	ST62728565	Historic England. "Monument No. 201524". Research records (formerly PastScape).	
Tresham	Tresham	ST803901	Historic England. "Monument No. 209247". Research records (formerly PastScape).	
Turkdean	Turkdean	SP099190	Historic England. "Monument No. 1185169". Research records (formerly PastScape).	Dug by Time Team 1997
Wadfield Farm	Winchcombe	SP02332604	Historic England. "Wadfield Roman Villa (327832)". Research records (formerly PastScape).	
Waltham Field	Whittington	SP00802093	Historic England. "Monument No. 328021". Research records (formerly PastScape).	Dug by Time Team 2000
West Chestle	Aldsworth	SP143101	Historic England. "West Chestle Villa (763697)". Research records (formerly PastScape).	
Whittington	Whittington	SP01562051	Historic England. "Monument No. 327977". Research records (formerly PastScape).	
Willington Court	Sandhurst	SO83862425	Historic England. "Willington Court Roman Villa (115715)". Research records (formerly PastScape).	
Withington	Withington	SP03111486	Historic England. "Monument No. 327648". Research records (formerly PastScape).	Dug by Time Team 2005
Woodchester	Woodchester	SO83960311	Historic England. "Woodchester Villa (115125)". Research records (formerly PastScape).	
Wortley	Wortley	ST76909184	Historic England. "Thatched Cottage (765487)". Research records (formerly PastScape).	

== Greater London ==
Name	Location	Grid reference	PastScape link	Notes
Beddington	Beddington	TQ29766581	Historic England. "Beddington Sewage Farm Roman Villa (400597)". Research records (formerly PastScape).	
Crofton	Orpington	TQ45426583	Historic England. "Monument No. 407700". Research records (formerly PastScape).	
Keston	Keston	TQ41316327	Historic England. "Monument No. 407834". Research records (formerly PastScape).	
Poverest Road	St Mary Cray	TQ46796758	Historic England. "Monument No. 407594". Research records (formerly PastScape).	Bath house only
Wanstead	Wanstead	TQ41658716	Historic England. "Monument No. 408132". Research records (formerly PastScape).	

== Hampshire ==
Name	Location	Grid reference	PastScape link	Notes
Abbotts Ann	Abbotts Ann	SU31434190	Historic England. "Monument No. 228300". Research records (formerly PastScape).	
Appleshaw	Appleshaw	SU30164764	Historic England. "Monument No. 228060". Research records (formerly PastScape).	
Balchester	Upper Wootton	SU58005594	Historic England. "Monument No. 236499". Research records (formerly PastScape).	
Binsted	Binsted	SU786413	Historic England. "Monument No. 243998". Research records (formerly PastScape).	
Bramdean	Bramdean	SU62752813	Historic England. "Monument No. 239199". Research records (formerly PastScape).	
Burghclere	Burghclere	SU48286015	Historic England. "Monument No. 233302". Research records (formerly PastScape).	
Clanville	Clanville	SU31454897	Historic England. "Monument No. 228030". Research records (formerly PastScape).	
Crondall	Crondall	SU79504712	Historic England. "Monument No. 243750". Research records (formerly PastScape).	
Eastleigh	Eastleigh	SU45231628	Historic England. "Monument No. 230032". Research records (formerly PastScape).	Now under Southampton Airport
Fullerton	Fullerton	SU37494006	Historic England. "Monument No. 227344". Research records (formerly PastScape).; Historic England. "Monument No. 228231". Research records (formerly PastScape).	
Fyfield	Fyfield	SU29525028	Historic England. "Monument No. 224368". Research records (formerly PastScape).	
Glade Farm	Bentley	SU77914582	Historic England. "Monument No. 243745". Research records (formerly PastScape).	
Grateley	Grateley	SU276410	Historic England. "Monument No. 223994". Research records (formerly PastScape).	
Hambledon	Hambledon	SU64431429	Historic England. "Monument No. 239063". Research records (formerly PastScape).	
Havant	Havant	SU69150726	Historic England. "Monument No. 238381". Research records (formerly PastScape).; Historic England. "Monument No. 238448". Research records (formerly PastScape).	
Hurstbourne Priors	Hurstbourne Priors	SU44574982	Historic England. "Monument No. 232098". Research records (formerly PastScape).	
Itchen Abbas	Itchen Abbas	SU52883430	Historic England. "Itchen Abbas Roman Villa (235842)". Research records (formerly PastScape).	
Langstone	Langstone	SU71730532	Historic England. "Monument No. 242160". Research records (formerly PastScape).	
Lippen Wood	West Meon	SU63212451	Historic England. "Monument No. 239364". Research records (formerly PastScape).	
Liss	Liss	SU7628		Excavated 2004-7
Longstock	Longstock	SU34193617	Historic England. "Monument No. 227553". Research records (formerly PastScape).	
Meonstoke	Meonstoke	SU61652105	Historic England. "Meonstoke (239419)". Research records (formerly PastScape).	
Micheldever Wood	Micheldever	SU53093820	Historic England. "Monument No. 235570". Research records (formerly PastScape).	
Monk Sherborne	Monk Sherborne	SU60665486	Historic England. "Monument No. 240586". Research records (formerly PastScape).	
North Waltham	North Waltham	SU56994549	Historic England. "Monument No. 236060". Research records (formerly PastScape).	
Odiham	Odiham	SU73615263	Historic England. "Monument No. 244258". Research records (formerly PastScape).	
Old Alresford	Old Alresford	SU58193342	Historic England. "Monument No. 235723". Research records (formerly PastScape).	
Rockbourne	Rockbourne	SU12011702	Historic England. "Rockbourne (217299)". Research records (formerly PastScape).	
Rowlands Castle	Rowlands Castle	SU73420988	Historic England. "Monument No. 242847". Research records (formerly PastScape).	
Rowlands Castle	Rowlands Castle	SU737114	Historic England. "Monument No. 242833". Research records (formerly PastScape).	
Sparsholt	Sparsholt	SU41493012	Historic England. "Monument No. 231909". Research records (formerly PastScape).	
Stanchester	Chilton Candover	SU58044108	Historic England. "Monument No. 236285". Research records (formerly PastScape).	
Stroud	Stroud	SU72512360	Historic England. "Monument No. 243069". Research records (formerly PastScape).	
Tidbury	Tidbury Ring	SU46284292	Historic England. "Tidbury Ring (232181)". Research records (formerly PastScape).	
Twyford	Twyford	SU48342439	Historic England. "Roman Villa (231220)". Research records (formerly PastScape).	
Upham	Upham	SU54422247	Historic England. "Monument No. 235346". Research records (formerly PastScape).	
Wyck	Wyck	SU75873938	Historic England. "Monument No. 243199". Research records (formerly PastScape).	Bath house only

== Herefordshire ==
Name	Location	Grid reference	PastScape link	Notes
Bishopstone	Bishopstone	SO41754337	Historic England. "Monument No. 108082". Research records (formerly PastScape).	
Credenhill	Credenhill	SO44654263	Historic England. "Monument No. 108096". Research records (formerly PastScape).	
Huntsham	Goodrich	SO56431768	Historic England. "Monument No. 109575". Research records (formerly PastScape).	
New Weir	Kenchester	SO43674181	Historic England. "Monument No. 108100". Research records (formerly PastScape).	
Radlett	Radlett	TL143011	Historic England. "Monument No. 362062". Research records (formerly PastScape).	
Radwell	Radwell	TL23443535	Historic England. "Monument No. 365614". Research records (formerly PastScape).	
Weston	Weston	TL27273079	Historic England. "Monument No. 365679". Research records (formerly PastScape).	

== Hertfordshire ==
Name	Location	Grid reference	PastScape link	Notes
Boxmoor	Boxmoor	TL03810568	Historic England. "Monument No. 359304". Research records (formerly PastScape).	
Dicket Mead	Welwyn	TL23551601	Historic England. "Welwyn Roman Baths (364864)". Research records (formerly PastScape).	
Gadebridge Park	Hemel Hempstead	TL05030867	Historic England. "Monument No. 359278". Research records (formerly PastScape).	
Gorhambury	Gorhambury	TL11750793	Historic England. "Monument No. 361934". Research records (formerly PastScape).	
Kings Langley	Kings Langley	TL078022	Historic England. "Monument No. 359335". Research records (formerly PastScape).	
Lockleys	Welwyn	TL23771620	Historic England. "Monument No. 364820". Research records (formerly PastScape).	
Moor Park	Moor Park	TQ08009348	Historic England. "Monument No. 395289". Research records (formerly PastScape).	
Northchurch	Northchurch	SP97300923	Historic England. "Monument No. 346269". Research records (formerly PastScape).	
Park Street	Park Street	TL14690308	Historic England. "Monument No. 362066". Research records (formerly PastScape).	
Wymondley, also known as Ninesprings,	near Hitchin	TL20722924	Historic England. "Monument No. 365078". Research records (formerly PastScape).	

== Isle of Wight ==
Name	Location	Grid reference	PastScape link	Notes
Brading	Brading	SZ60008625	Historic England. "Brading Roman Villa (461161)". Research records (formerly PastScape).	
Carisbrooke	Carisbrooke	SZ48508809	Historic England. "Monument No. 460043". Research records (formerly PastScape).	
Clatterford	Carisbrooke	SZ47968747	Historic England. "Monument No. 460017". Research records (formerly PastScape).	
Combley	Robin Hill	SZ53808787	Historic England. "Combley Roman Villa (461298)". Research records (formerly PastScape).	
Gurnard	Gurnard	SZ47149540	Historic England. "Monument No. 460615". Research records (formerly PastScape).	Has eroded into the sea
Newport	Newport	SZ50118855	Historic England. "Monument No. 461238". Research records (formerly PastScape).	
Rock	Brighstone	SZ42368415	Historic England. "Monument No. 460425". Research records (formerly PastScape).	

== Kent ==
Name	Location	Grid reference	PastScape link	Notes
Abbey Farm	Minster	TR31366463	Historic England. "Monument No. 469621". Research records (formerly PastScape).	
Ash	New Ash Green	TQ60846500	Historic England. "Monument No. 413256". Research records (formerly PastScape).	
Bax Farm	Teynham	TQ94806409	Historic England. "Monument No. 1316061". Research records (formerly PastScape).	
Blean	Blean	TR12866062	Historic England. "Monument No. 1249608". Research records (formerly PastScape).	
Boxted	Upchurch	TQ85386626	Historic England. "Monument No. 418307". Research records (formerly PastScape).	
Cobham Park	Cobham	TQ68326932	Historic England. "Monument No. 413160". Research records (formerly PastScape).	
Crofton Roman Villa	Orpington	TQ454658		
Darenth Court	Darenth	TQ56337064	Historic England. "Darenth Court Roman Villa (410759)". Research records (formerly PastScape).	
Dartford	Dartford	TQ54647345	Historic England. "Monument No. 411352". Research records (formerly PastScape).	
Eccles	Eccles	TQ72106061	Historic England. "Monument No. 416441". Research records (formerly PastScape).	
Farningham	Farningham	TQ54496674	Historic England. "Monument No. 410069". Research records (formerly PastScape).	
Franks	Farningham	TQ55416742	Historic England. "Franks Roman Villa (409879)". Research records (formerly PastScape).	
Faversham	Faversham	TR02086172	Historic England. "Monument No. 463687". Research records (formerly PastScape).	
Folkestone	Folkestone	TR24083699	Historic England. "Monument No. 465716". Research records (formerly PastScape).	
Hartlip	Hartlip	TQ82876403	Historic England. "Monument No. 418600". Research records (formerly PastScape).	
Luddenham	Luddenham	TQ976626	Historic England. "Monument No. 1316075". Research records (formerly PastScape).; Historic England. "Monument No. 419986". Research records (formerly PastScape).; Historic England. "Monument No. 419991". Research records (formerly PastScape).; Historic England. "Monument No. 419994". Research records (formerly PastScape).	
Lullingstone	Lullingstone	TQ53016508	Historic England. "Lullingstone Roman Villa (410045)". Research records (formerly PastScape).	
Maidstone	Maidstone	TQ75725621	Historic England. "Monument No. 415105". Research records (formerly PastScape).	
Maidstone	Maidstone	TQ76575485	Historic England. "Monument No. 415680". Research records (formerly PastScape).	
Newbury	Rodmersham	TQ92525982	Historic England. "Monument No. 1316263". Research records (formerly PastScape).	
Otford	Otford	TQ53625922	Historic England. "Monument No. 409588". Research records (formerly PastScape).	
Plaxtol	Plaxtol	TQ61485313	Historic England. "Monument No. 412963". Research records (formerly PastScape).	
Sandwich	Sandwich	TR31905730	Historic England. "Monument No. 468326". Research records (formerly PastScape).	
Snodland	Snodland	TQ70756201	Historic England. "Monument No. 416478". Research records (formerly PastScape).	
Teston	Teston	TQ69885316	Historic England. "Monument No. 412907". Research records (formerly PastScape).	
Thurnham	Thurnham	TQ79785715	Historic England. "Monument No. 415057". Research records (formerly PastScape).	
Wilmington	Wilmington	TQ54177299	Historic England. "Monument No. 410980". Research records (formerly PastScape).	
Wingham	Wingham	TR24055724	Historic England. "Monument No. 466356". Research records (formerly PastScape).	

== Leicestershire ==
Name	Location	Grid reference	PastScape link	Notes
Bringhurst	Bringhurst	SP844921	Historic England. "Monument No. 964600". Research records (formerly PastScape).	
Drayton	Drayton	SP817918	Historic England. "Monument No. 964689". Research records (formerly PastScape).	
Claybrooke Magna	Claybrooke Magna	SP481885	Historic England. "Monument No. 964656". Research records (formerly PastScape).	
Glooston	Glooston	SP75279603	Historic England. "Monument No. 344021". Research records (formerly PastScape).	
Hamilton Grounds	Barkby Thorpe	SK647076	Historic England. "Monument No. 319193". Research records (formerly PastScape).	
Lockington	Lockington-Hemington	SK480295	Historic England. "Monument No. 315175". Research records (formerly PastScape).	
Lowesby	Lowesby	SK736068	Historic England. "Monument No. 964659". Research records (formerly PastScape).	
Medbourne	Medbourne	SP79829299	Historic England. "Monument No. 344073". Research records (formerly PastScape).	
Norfolk Street	Leicester	SK57530437	Historic England. "Monument No. 316867". Research records (formerly PastScape).	
Osbaston	Osbaston	SK425038	Historic England. "Monument No. 964895". Research records (formerly PastScape).	
Ridgeway	Rothley	SK56901229	Historic England. "Monument No. 317190". Research records (formerly PastScape).	
Sapcote	Sapcote	SP49679312	Historic England. "Monument No. 338045". Research records (formerly PastScape).	
Stocking Field	Drayton	SP83059310	Historic England. "Monument No. 346249". Research records (formerly PastScape).	
West Langton	West Langton	SP71489207	Historic England. "Monument No. 344132". Research records (formerly PastScape).	
Wycomb	Goadby Marwood	SK782255	Historic England. "Monument No. 964934". Research records (formerly PastScape).	

== Lincolnshire ==
Name	Location	Grid reference	PastScape link	Notes
Barrs Farm	Hemingby	TF24157331	Historic England. "Monument No. 352988". Research records (formerly PastScape).	
Denton	Denton	SK87593094	Historic England. "Monument No. 323786". Research records (formerly PastScape).	
Glentworth Hall	Glentworth	SK94378828	Historic England. "Monument No. 920235". Research records (formerly PastScape).	
Gravel Pit Farm	Kirton in Lindsey	SK939966	Historic England. "Monument No. 1063122". Research records (formerly PastScape).	
Haceby	Haceby	TF01953692	Historic England. "Monument No. 348661". Research records (formerly PastScape).	
Horkstow	Horkstow	SE98491914	Historic England. "Monument No. 63618". Research records (formerly PastScape).	
Kirmond le Mire	Kirmond le Mire	TF183930	Historic England. "Monument No. 893061". Research records (formerly PastScape).	
Mount Pleasant Farm	Kirton in Lindsey	SE93940038	Historic England. "Monument No. 63566". Research records (formerly PastScape).	
Norton Disney	Norton Disney	SK85896028	Historic England. "Monument No. 324486". Research records (formerly PastScape).	
Roxby	Roxby	SE92031697	Historic England. "Monument No. 63684". Research records (formerly PastScape).	
Scampton	Scampton	SK95527847	Historic England. "Monument No. 326410". Research records (formerly PastScape).	
Stainby	Stainby	SK921222	Historic England. "Monument No. 325510". Research records (formerly PastScape).	
Stoke Rochford	Stoke Rochford	SK9328	Historic England. "Monument No. 325445". Research records (formerly PastScape).; Historic England. "Monument No. 325448". Research records (formerly PastScape).	
Sudbrooke	Sudbrooke	TF037765	Historic England. "Monument No. 1589635". Research records (formerly PastScape).	Excavated 2005–7
Walesby	Walesby	TF14739262	Historic England. "Monument No. 351895". Research records (formerly PastScape).	
Winterton	Winterton	SE90961799	Historic England. "Monument No. 63693". Research records (formerly PastScape).	

== Norfolk ==
Name	Location	Grid reference	PastScape link	Notes
Bolwick Hall	Bolwick Hall	TG205245	Historic England. "Monument No. 133102". Research records (formerly PastScape).	
Feltwell	Feltwell	TL700921	Historic England. "Monument No. 380605". Research records (formerly PastScape).	
Feltwell	Feltwell	TL715909	Historic England. "Monument No. 380586". Research records (formerly PastScape).	Bath house only
Gayton Thorpe	Gayton Thorpe	TF73541806	Historic England. "Gayton Thorpe (357080)". Research records (formerly PastScape).	
Grimston	Grimston	TF716216	Historic England. "Monument No. 357416". Research records (formerly PastScape).	
Snettisham	Snettisham	TF68953370	Historic England. "Monument No. 356701". Research records (formerly PastScape).	
Tivetshall	Tivetshall St Mary	TM164843	Historic England. "Monument No. 389215". Research records (formerly PastScape).	
Weeting	Weeting	TL77808784	Historic England. "Monument No. 380213". Research records (formerly PastScape).	

== Northamptonshire ==
Name	Location	Grid reference	PastScape link	Notes
Apethorpe	Apethorpe	TL02639493	Historic England. "Monument No. 361757". Research records (formerly PastScape).	
Ashley	Ashley	SP79409163	Historic England. "Monument No. 344086". Research records (formerly PastScape).	
Borough Hill	Daventry	SP58906321	Historic England. "Monument No. 339861". Research records (formerly PastScape).	
Brixworth	Brixworth	SP74657187	Historic England. "Monument No. 962749". Research records (formerly PastScape).	
Byfield	Byfield	SP506545	Historic England. "Monument No. 339748". Research records (formerly PastScape).	
Chipping Warden	Chipping Warden	SP51094822	Historic England. "Monument No. 339306". Research records (formerly PastScape).	
Cosgrove	Cosgrove	SP79474212	Historic England. "Cosgrove Roman Villa (343100)". Research records (formerly PastScape).	
Cotterstock	Cotterstock	TL03209101	Historic England. "Monument No. 361745". Research records (formerly PastScape).	
Deanshanger	Deanshanger	SP770396	Historic England. "Monument No. 342874". Research records (formerly PastScape).	
Fotheringhay	Fotheringhay	TL07899446	Historic England. "Monument No. 361593". Research records (formerly PastScape).	
Great Weldon	Weldon	SP92948999	Historic England. "Monument No. 347512". Research records (formerly PastScape).	
Harpole	Harpole	SP68385990	Historic England. "Monument No. 341461". Research records (formerly PastScape).	
Harpole	Harpole	SP68936209	Historic England. "Monument No. 341732". Research records (formerly PastScape).	
Meadow Furlong	Stanwick	SP97147179	Historic England. "Monument No. 347335". Research records (formerly PastScape).	
Nether Heyford	Nether Heyford	SP66675865	Historic England. "Monument No. 341458". Research records (formerly PastScape).	
North Lodge Farm	Barnwell	TL07438368	Historic England. "Monument No. 361159". Research records (formerly PastScape).	
Piddington	Piddington	SP79785414	Historic England. "Piddington Roman Villa (343312)". Research records (formerly PastScape).	
Quinton	Quinton	SP775535	Historic England. "Monument No. 343322". Research records (formerly PastScape).	
Ringstead	Ringstead	SP976748	Historic England. "Monument No. 347389". Research records (formerly PastScape).	
Stoke Bruerne	Stoke Bruerne	SP75465003	Historic England. "Monument No. 343315". Research records (formerly PastScape).	
Thenford	Thenford	SP52524158	Historic England. "Monument No. 339407". Research records (formerly PastScape).	
Whitehall Farm	Nether Heyford	SP6458		Excavated 2000–2012
Whittlebury	Whittlebury	SP73224457	Historic England. "Monument No. 343177". Research records (formerly PastScape).	
Wollaston	Wollaston	SP90096499	Historic England. "Monument No. 347131". Research records (formerly PastScape).	
Wollaston	Wollaston	SP90326254	Historic England. "Monument No. 347126". Research records (formerly PastScape).	
Wootton	Hunsbury Hill	SP737582	Historic England. "Hunsbury Hill Complex (343298)". Research records (formerly PastScape).	
Yarwell	Yarwell	TL06189914	Historic England. "Monument No. 361372". Research records (formerly PastScape).	
Yarwell	Yarwell	TL06689789	Historic England. "Monument No. 361340". Research records (formerly PastScape).	

== Nottinghamshire ==
Name	Location	Grid reference	PastScape link	Notes
Car Colston	Car Colston	SK71934248	Historic England. "Monument No. 321937". Research records (formerly PastScape).; Historic England. "Monument No. 321879". Research records (formerly PastScape).	
Cromwell	Cromwell	SK802625	Historic England. "Monument No. 324520". Research records (formerly PastScape).	
Glebe Farm	Barton in Fabis	SK52683166	Historic England. "Monument No. 317772". Research records (formerly PastScape).	
Northfield	Mansfield Woodhouse	SK52516455	Historic England. "Monument No. 318221". Research records (formerly PastScape).	
Oldcotes	Oldcotes	SK59098853	Historic England. "Monument No. 318493". Research records (formerly PastScape).	
Southwell	Southwell	SK70285378	Historic England. "Monument No. 322403". Research records (formerly PastScape).	
Wood Meadow	Thurgarton	SK67344945	Historic England. "Monument No. 319888". Research records (formerly PastScape).	

== Oxfordshire ==
Name	Location	Grid reference	PastScape link	Notes
Asthall	Asthall	SP30261120	Historic England. "Monument No. 334805". Research records (formerly PastScape).	
Barton Court Farm	Abingdon	SU510977	Historic England. "Monument No. 238005". Research records (formerly PastScape).	
Brize Lodge	Ramsden	SP33931525	Historic England. "Monument No. 334723". Research records (formerly PastScape).	
Broughton Castle	Broughton Castle			
Callow Hill	Stonesfield	SP40971943	Historic England. "Callow Hill Roman Villa (336638)". Research records (formerly PastScape).	
Ditchend	Little Milton	SP62390030	Historic England. "Monument No. 340827". Research records (formerly PastScape).	
Ditchley	Ditchley	SP39932008	Historic England. "Monument No. 334944". Research records (formerly PastScape).	
Dropshort	Sutton Courtenay	SU49429389	Historic England. "Sutton Courtenay Roman Villa (234105)". Research records (formerly PastScape).	Dug by Time Team, 2013
Elsfield	Elsfield	SP54900895	Historic England. "Monument No. 338425". Research records (formerly PastScape).	
Fawler	Fawler	SP37171689	Historic England. "Fawler Roman Villa (334566)". Research records (formerly PastScape).	
Frilford	Frilford	SU42289726	Historic England. "Monument No. 234025". Research records (formerly PastScape).	
Garford	Garford	SU43709542	Historic England. "Monument No. 1516137". Research records (formerly PastScape).; Historic England. "Monument No. 234095". Research records (formerly PastScape).	
Gatehampton	Goring-on-Thames	SU60007990	Historic England. "Monument No. 1401795". Research records (formerly PastScape).	
Great Tew	Great Tew	SP40502748	Historic England. "Monument No. 336845". Research records (formerly PastScape).	
Hanwell	Hanwell	SP42864373	Historic England. "Monument No. 337244". Research records (formerly PastScape).	
Harpsden	Harpsden	SU75658047	Historic England. "Monument No. 245276". Research records (formerly PastScape).	
Islip	Islip	SP53251342	Historic England. "Monument No. 338766". Research records (formerly PastScape).	
North Leigh	North Leigh	SP39701541	Historic England. "North Leigh Roman Villa (334573)". Research records (formerly PastScape).	
Oaklands Farm	Fawler	SP37931667	Historic England. "Oaklands Farm Roman Villa (334563)". Research records (formerly PastScape).	
Shakenoak	North Leigh	SP374138	Historic England. "Monument No. 334742". Research records (formerly PastScape).	
Stanford in the Vale	Stanford in the Vale	SU32499510	Historic England. "Monument No. 662144". Research records (formerly PastScape).	
Stonesfield	Stonesfield	SP40031706	Historic England. "Monument No. 336649". Research records (formerly PastScape).	
West Challow	West Challow	SU37578789	Historic England. "Monument No. 229123". Research records (formerly PastScape).	
Wheatley	Wheatley	SP60580441	Historic England. "Monument No. 340823". Research records (formerly PastScape).	
Wigginton	Wigginton	SP39363356	Historic England. "Monument No. 335107". Research records (formerly PastScape).	
Widford	Widford	SP27791185	Historic England. "Monument No. 332368". Research records (formerly PastScape).	
Woolstone	Woolstone	SU29048777	Historic England. "Monument No. 225384". Research records (formerly PastScape).	

== Rutland ==
Name	Location	Grid reference	PastScape link	Notes
Empingham	Empingham	SK94280765	Historic England. "Monument No. 325179". Research records (formerly PastScape).; Historic England. "Monument No. 325182". Research records (formerly PastScape).	
Great Casterton	Great Casterton	TF00640955	Historic England. "Monument No. 347942". Research records (formerly PastScape).	
'Rutland'	Ketton	SK9667303053		discovered in 2020 with Homer's Iliad mosaic
Thistleton	Thistleton	SK90951717	Historic England. "Monument No. 325314". Research records (formerly PastScape).	
Tixover	Tixover	SK98150188	Historic England. "Monument No. 325200". Research records (formerly PastScape).	

== Shropshire ==
Name	Location	Grid reference	PastScape link	Notes
Acton Scott	Acton Scott	SO45808977	Historic England. "Monument No. 108871". Research records (formerly PastScape).	
Ashford Carbonell	Ashford Carbonell	SO53136932	Historic England. "Monument No. 912155". Research records (formerly PastScape).	
Cruckton	Cruckton	SJ43211017	Historic England. "Monument No. 68458". Research records (formerly PastScape).	
Lea	Shorthill	SJ41760848	Historic England. "Monument No. 67687". Research records (formerly PastScape).	
Whitley Grange	Bayston Hill	SJ45700963	Historic England. "Whitley Grange (67621)". Research records (formerly PastScape).	
Yarchester	Harley	SJ60650091	Historic England. "Monument No. 72091". Research records (formerly PastScape).	

== Somerset ==
Name	Location	Grid reference	PastScape link	Notes
Banwell	Banwell	ST39825927	Historic England. "Monument No. 192470". Research records (formerly PastScape).	
Birdcombe	Wraxall	ST47877158	Historic England. "Monument No. 195364". Research records (formerly PastScape).	
Blacklands	Laverton	ST765541	Historic England. "Monument No. 203138". Research records (formerly PastScape).; Historic England. "Monument No. 203149". Research records (formerly PastScape).	Dug by Time Team in 2006
Bratton Seymour	Bratton Seymour	ST66702990	Historic England. "Monument No. 199624". Research records (formerly PastScape).	
Burnett	Burnett	ST66506454	Historic England. "Monument No. 201090". Research records (formerly PastScape).	
Chew Magna	Chew Magna	ST588610	Historic England. "Monument No. 198033". Research records (formerly PastScape).	
Chew Park	Chew Valley Lake	ST56885934	Historic England. "Monument No. 197267". Research records (formerly PastScape).	
East Coker	East Coker	ST54601377	Historic England. "Monument No. 196215". Research records (formerly PastScape).	
Combe	Combe Down	ST76146219	Historic England. "Monument No. 204067". Research records (formerly PastScape).	
Compton Dundon	Compton Dundon	ST49163104	Historic England. "Monument No. 194010". Research records (formerly PastScape).	
Dinnington	Dinnington	ST404135	Historic England. "Monument No. 193485". Research records (formerly PastScape).	Dug by Time Team 2002 and 2005
Ham Hill	Ham Hill Hillfort	ST48831649	Historic England. "Monument No. 193155". Research records (formerly PastScape).	
High Ham	High Ham	ST42182952	Historic England. "High Ham Roman Villa (193634)". Research records (formerly PastScape).	
Hurcot	Hurcott	ST51132972	Historic England. "Monument No. 196343". Research records (formerly PastScape).	
Iford	Farleigh Hungerford	ST79735830	Historic England. "Monument No. 202980". Research records (formerly PastScape).	
Ilchester	Ilchester	ST51222213	Historic England. "Monument No. 196528". Research records (formerly PastScape).	
Keynsham Cemetery	Keynsham	ST64516925	Historic England. "Monument No. 201036". Research records (formerly PastScape).	
Lopen	Lopen	ST427139	Historic England. "Monument No. 1391028". Research records (formerly PastScape).	
Low Ham	Low Ham	ST43552884	Historic England. "Monument No. 193640". Research records (formerly PastScape).	
Lufton	Lufton	ST51511784	Historic England. "Monument No. 196068". Research records (formerly PastScape).	
Mells Park	Leigh-on-Mendip	ST703475	Historic England. "Monument No. 202840". Research records (formerly PastScape).	
Newton St Loe	Newton St Loe	ST71206553	Historic England. "Monument No. 203682". Research records (formerly PastScape).	
Paulton	Paulton	ST67125674	Historic England. "Monument No. 200482". Research records (formerly PastScape).	
Pitney	Pitney	ST45053006	Historic England. "Monument No. 194019". Research records (formerly PastScape).	
Priddy	Priddy	ST53095146	Historic England. "Monument No. 197734". Research records (formerly PastScape).	
Shapwick	Shapwick	ST42473948	Historic England. "Monument No. 1267212". Research records (formerly PastScape).	
Somerdale	Keynsham	ST65636894	Historic England. "Monument No. 200916". Research records (formerly PastScape).; Historic England. "Monument No. 1480443". Research records (formerly PastScape).	In the grounds of the Somerdale Factory
Somerton	Somerton	ST49712904	Historic England. "Monument No. 193535". Research records (formerly PastScape).	
Wadeford	Wadeford	ST30881049	Historic England. "Monument No. 191803". Research records (formerly PastScape).	
Wellow	Wellow	ST72805799	Historic England. "Monument No. 203043". Research records (formerly PastScape).	
Wemberham	Yatton	ST40526522	Historic England. "Monument No. 194992". Research records (formerly PastScape).	
Westland	Yeovil	ST54881570	Historic England. "Monument No. 196095". Research records (formerly PastScape).	Possibly a small town
West Coker	West Coker	ST528138	Historic England. "Monument No. 196297". Research records (formerly PastScape).	
Whatley	Whatley	ST74424699	Historic England. "Monument No. 202781". Research records (formerly PastScape).	Now within Nunney parish boundaries
Whitestaunton	Whitestaunton	ST28021058	Historic England. "Monument No. 190400". Research records (formerly PastScape).	
Wincanton	Wincanton	ST70212819	Historic England. "Monument No. 202365". Research records (formerly PastScape).	

== Staffordshire ==
Name	Location	Grid reference	PastScape link	Notes
Acton Trussell	Acton Trussell	SJ937175	Historic England. "Monument No. 77144". Research records (formerly PastScape).	
Hales	Hales	SJ72223371	Historic England. "Monument No. 74380". Research records (formerly PastScape).	
Shenstone	Shenstone	SK11030544	Historic England. "Monument No. 306513". Research records (formerly PastScape).	
Engleton	Brewood	SJ89451023	Historic England. "Monument No. 75403". Research records (formerly PastScape).	

== Suffolk ==
Name	Location	Grid reference	PastScape link	Notes
Castle Hill	Castle Hill, Ipswich	TM14744660	Historic England. "Castle Hill Roman Villa (388170)". Research records (formerly PastScape).	Dug by Time Team 2003
Exning	Exning	TL61216759	Historic England. "Exning Roman Villa (377367)". Research records (formerly PastScape).	
Farnham	Farnham	TM37125836	Historic England. "Monument No. 391328". Research records (formerly PastScape).	Bath house only
Horselands	Icklingham	TL78067204	Historic England. "Horselands (379957)". Research records (formerly PastScape).	
Lidgate	Lidgate	TL73195715	Historic England. "Monument No. 379484". Research records (formerly PastScape).	
Pakenham	Pakenham	TL90126950	Historic England. "Monument No. 385187". Research records (formerly PastScape).	
Stanton Chare	Stanton	TL955742	Historic England. "Stanton Chair (385417)". Research records (formerly PastScape).	
Stonham Aspal	Stonham Aspal	TM13095944	Historic England. "Monument No. 388631". Research records (formerly PastScape).	Bath house only

== Surrey ==
Name	Location	Grid reference	PastScape link	Notes
Abinger	Abinger	TQ10644746	Historic England. "Monument No. 396943". Research records (formerly PastScape).	
Ashtead	Ashtead	TQ17756017	Historic England. "Ashtead Roman Villa (397707)". Research records (formerly PastScape).	
Banstead	Banstead	TQ22395567	Historic England. "Monument No. 400125". Research records (formerly PastScape).	
Binscombe	Farncombe	SU970460	Historic England. "Binscombe III (968706)". Research records (formerly PastScape).; Historic England. "Binscombe II (250258)". Research records (formerly PastScape).; Historic England. "Binscombe I (250253)". Research records (formerly PastScape).	
Chiddingfold	Chiddingfold	SU97843610	Historic England. "Monument No. 249940". Research records (formerly PastScape).	
Compton	Compton	SU95734798	Historic England. "Monument No. 250238". Research records (formerly PastScape).	
Rapsley	Ewhurst	TQ08034152	Historic England. "Monument No. 393954". Research records (formerly PastScape).	
Titsey Park	Titsey Place	TQ40485457	Historic England. "Monument No. 407426". Research records (formerly PastScape).	
Walton Heath	Walton Heath	TQ23165365	Historic England. "Monument No. 400396". Research records (formerly PastScape).	
Worplesdon	Worplesdon	SU96895107	Historic England. "Monument No. 250813". Research records (formerly PastScape).	

== Sussex ==
=== East Sussex ===
Name	Location	Grid reference	PastScape link	Notes
Barcombe	Barcombe	TQ417142	Historic England. "Monument No. 618719". Research records (formerly PastScape).	
Eastbourne	Eastbourne	TV618990	Historic England. "Monument No. 470246". Research records (formerly PastScape).	
Hartfield	Hartfield	TQ44373195	Historic England. "Monument No. 407127". Research records (formerly PastScape).	
Plumpton	Plumpton	TQ360147	Historic England. "Monument No. 974745". Research records (formerly PastScape).	
Preston Court	Beddingham	TQ45870734	Historic England. "Monument No. 973183". Research records (formerly PastScape).	
Preston Park	Preston Park, Brighton	TQ30910572	Historic England. "Monument No. 401953". Research records (formerly PastScape).	

=== West Sussex ===
Name	Location	Grid reference	PastScape link	Notes
Angmering	Angmering	TQ05310451	Historic England. "Monument No. 392756". Research records (formerly PastScape).	
Arundel	Arundel	TQ01540692	Historic England. "Monument No. 392697". Research records (formerly PastScape).	
Batten Hanger	Elsted and Treyford	SU81801533	Historic England. "Monument No. 246266". Research records (formerly PastScape).	
Bignor	Bignor	SU98841469	Historic England. "Monument No. 249475". Research records (formerly PastScape).	
Borough Farm	Pulborough	TQ06882009	Historic England. "Monument No. 393391". Research records (formerly PastScape).	
Chilgrove	Chilgrove	SU83441244	Historic England. "Chilgrove 1 (246688)". Research records (formerly PastScape).	
Chilgrove	Chilgrove	SU84121362	Historic England. "Chilgrove 2 (246691)". Research records (formerly PastScape).	
Fishbourne	Fishbourne	SU83940479	Historic England. "Fishbourne Roman Palace (245943)". Research records (formerly PastScape).	
Hurstpierpoint	Hurstpierpoint	TQ28091505	Historic England. "Monument No. 398970". Research records (formerly PastScape).	
Littlehampton	Littlehampton	TQ03960266	Historic England. "Monument No. 392824". Research records (formerly PastScape).	
Northbrook College	Worthing	TQ105038	Historic England. "Monument No. 762877". Research records (formerly PastScape).	
Pitlands Farm	Up Marden	SU797124	Historic England. "Monument No. 242752". Research records (formerly PastScape).	
Sidlesham	Sidlesham	SZ85479702	Historic England. "Monument No. 462211". Research records (formerly PastScape).	
Southwick	Southwick	TQ24460565	Historic England. "Monument No. 398675". Research records (formerly PastScape).	
Walberton	Walberton	SU978056		Excavated since 2006
West Marden	West Marden	SU77341264	Historic England. "Monument No. 242738". Research records (formerly PastScape).	
Wiggonholt	Wiggonholt	TQ06471756	Historic England. "Monument No. 392908". Research records (formerly PastScape).	Bath house only

== Warwickshire ==
Name	Location	Grid reference	PastScape link	Notes
Radford Semele	Radford Semele	SP34256245	Historic England. "Monument No. 335629". Research records (formerly PastScape).	
Snowford Bridge	Long Itchington	SP39646685	Historic England. "Monument No. 335483". Research records (formerly PastScape).	

== Wiltshire ==
Name	Location	Grid reference	PastScape link	Notes
Allington	Allington	SU20693833	Historic England. "Monument No. 223270". Research records (formerly PastScape).	
Atworth	Atworth	ST85556640	Historic England. "Monument No. 207925". Research records (formerly PastScape).	
Bedwyn	Bedwyn	SU28356295	Historic England. "Castle Copse Roman Villa (224845)". Research records (formerly PastScape).	
Box	Box	ST82326854	Historic England. "Monument No. 207955". Research records (formerly PastScape).	
Bradford on Avon	Bradford on Avon	ST81756135	Historic England. "Monument No. 867326". Research records (formerly PastScape).	
Brixton Deverill	Brixton Deverill	ST86183884		Discovered in 2016.
Bromham	Bromham	ST97086620	Historic England. "Monument No. 211997". Research records (formerly PastScape).	
Browns Farm	Marlborough	SU19296785	Historic England. "Monument No. 969756". Research records (formerly PastScape).	
Chiseldon	Chiseldon	SU19428095	Historic England. "Monument No. 222007". Research records (formerly PastScape).	
Colerne	Colerne	ST811718	Historic England. "Monument No. 208491". Research records (formerly PastScape).	
Downton	Downton	SU18142106	Historic England. "Monument No. 217913". Research records (formerly PastScape).	
Grimstead	East Grimstead	SU23372748	Historic England. "Monument No. 223061". Research records (formerly PastScape).	
Hazelbury	Box	ST837681	Historic England. "Monument No. 207977". Research records (formerly PastScape).	
Hannington	Hannington	SU18099585	Historic England. "Monument No. 222138". Research records (formerly PastScape).	
Lay Wood	Devizes	SU028629		Discovered in 2013
Littlecote	Littlecote Park	SU30017055	Historic England. "Littlecote Villa (229119)". Research records (formerly PastScape).	
Manningford Bruce	Manningford	SU14025805	Historic England. "Monument No. 220193". Research records (formerly PastScape).	
Netheravon	Netheravon	SU14764815	Historic England. "Monument No. 218930". Research records (formerly PastScape).	Dug by Time Team, 1996
Nuthills Farm	Sandy Lane	ST96936832	Historic England. "Monument No. 212025". Research records (formerly PastScape).	Environs of town of Verlucio
Pit Meads	Sutton Veny	ST900433	Historic England. "Pit Meads Roman Villas (211416)". Research records (formerly PastScape).	
Rudge	Froxfield	SU27996960	Historic England. "Monument No. 224670". Research records (formerly PastScape).	
Sherston	Sherston	ST85558670	Historic England. "Monument No. 867348". Research records (formerly PastScape).	
Stanton Fitzwarren	Stanton Fitzwarren	SU17329020	Historic England. "Monument No. 222169". Research records (formerly PastScape).	
Stanton Park	Stanton St Quintin	ST89607962	Historic England. "Monument No. 208219". Research records (formerly PastScape).	
Starveall Farm	Bishopstone	SU25928158	Historic England. "Monument No. 225577". Research records (formerly PastScape).	
Tockenham	Tockenham	SU03887971	Historic England. "Monument No. 887838". Research records (formerly PastScape).	Dug by Time Team, 1994
Truckle Hill	Ford	ST83687609	Historic England. "Monument No. 208315". Research records (formerly PastScape).	
West Dean	West Dean	SU25792710	Historic England. "Monument No. 222998". Research records (formerly PastScape).	On the Hampshire-Wiltshire border

== Worcestershire ==
Name	Location	Grid reference	PastScape link	Notes
Bays Meadow	Droitwich Spa	SO897638	Historic England. "Salinae (116308)". Research records (formerly PastScape).	

== Yorkshire ==
=== East Riding of Yorkshire ===
Name	Location	Grid reference	PastScape link	Notes
Brantingham	Brantingham	SE93152880	Historic England. "Brantingham Roman Villa (63917)". Research records (formerly PastScape).	
Grindale	Grindale	TA13457122	Historic England. "Monument No. 81350". Research records (formerly PastScape).	
Harpham	Harpham	TA08996360	Historic England. "Monument No. 79578". Research records (formerly PastScape).	
Rudston	Rudston	TA08946671	Historic England. "Monument No. 79473". Research records (formerly PastScape).	
South Newbald	South Newbald	SE90453610	Historic England. "Monument No. 64117". Research records (formerly PastScape).	

=== North Yorkshire ===
Name	Location	Grid reference	PastScape link	Notes
Aiskew	Aiskew	SE2789		Historic England: Aiskew Roman villa Excavated 2014-15
Beadlam	Beadlam	SE63428412	Historic England. "Monument No. 58835". Research records (formerly PastScape).	
Castle Dikes	North Stainley	SE29137559	Historic England. "Castle Dykes (52079)". Research records (formerly PastScape).	
Chapel House Farm	Dalton on Tees	NZ30080822	Historic England. "Monument No. 1230878". Research records (formerly PastScape).	
Hovingham	Hovingham	SE66237569	Historic England. "Monument No. 58446". Research records (formerly PastScape).	
Kirk Sink	Gargrave	SD93955351	Historic England. "Kirk Sink (46569)". Research records (formerly PastScape).	
Langton	Langton	SE81646750	Historic England. "Monument No. 61982". Research records (formerly PastScape).; Historic England. "Monument No. 61976". Research records (formerly PastScape).	
Middleham	Middleham	SE13468722	Historic England. "Monument No. 50870". Research records (formerly PastScape).	Bath suite only
Piercebridge	Manfield	NZ221152	Historic England. "Monument No. 23732". Research records (formerly PastScape).	
Pond Head Farm	Oulston	SE5674	Historic England. "Monument No. 56890". Research records (formerly PastScape).	or Burton House Farm
Quarry Farm	Ingleby Barwick	NZ437150	Historic England. "Monument No. 1314853". Research records (formerly PastScape).	
Street House	Loftus	NZ7419		Excavated in 2012
Tadcaster	Kirkby Wharfe	SE50564094	Historic England. "Monument No. 56512". Research records (formerly PastScape).	
Well	Well	SE26498182	Historic England. "Monument No. 52235". Research records (formerly PastScape).	
Wharram Grange	Wharram le Street	SE847656	Historic England. "Monument No. 1143533". Research records (formerly PastScape).	
Wharram le Street	Wharram le Street	SE868662	Historic England. "Monument No. 1315010". Research records (formerly PastScape).	

=== South Yorkshire ===
Name	Location	Grid reference	PastScape link	Notes
Stancil	Wadworth	SK60979604	Historic England. "Monument No. 320822". Research records (formerly PastScape).	

=== West Yorkshire ===
Name	Location	Grid reference	PastScape link	Notes
Dalton Parlours	Collingham	SE40274453	Historic England. "Dalton Parlours (54988)". Research records (formerly PastScape).	

== See also ==
- List of Roman villas in Wales
