= List of Roman villas in Wales =

A list of Roman villas in Wales confirmed by archaeology.

Name	Location	Local authority	Historic county	Grid reference	Coflein reference	Notes
Abermagwr	Abermagwr	Ceredigion	Cardiganshire	SN66887418		Excavated in 2010
Castle Tump	Caerwent	Monmouthshire	Monmouthshire	ST47549114		
Cwmbrwyn	Llanddowror	Carmarthenshire	Carmarthenshire	SN25371213		
Dan-y-Graig	Newton	Bridgend County Borough	Glamorgan	SS84017802		
Ely Race Course	Ely	Cardiff	Glamorgan	ST14727615		
Five Lanes	Caerwent	Monmouthshire	Monmouthshire	ST44609101		
Ford	Wolfscastle	Pembrokeshire	Pembrokeshire	SM94962647		Trial excavation in 2003
Ford Farm	Langstone	Newport	Monmouthshire	ST38398954		
Llandough	Llandough	Vale of Glamorgan	Glamorgan	ST168733		
Llantwit Major	Llantwit Major	Vale of Glamorgan	Glamorgan	SS95886998		
Llys Brychan	Llangadog	Carmarthenshire	Carmarthenshire	SN70492545		
Margam	Margam Country Park	Neath Port Talbot	West Glamorgan	SS8086		Announced January 2026
Rossett	Burton, Wrexham	Wrexham	Denbighshire	SJ3458		Excavated September 2021
Trelissey	Amroth	Pembrokeshire	Pembrokeshire	SN17500785		
Whitton Lodge	Dyffryn	Vale of Glamorgan	Glamorgan	ST08117133		Threatened by a road scheme to replace Five Mile Lane

== See also ==
- List of Roman villas in England
