= Bucknowle Farm =

Coordinates: 50°37′58.3″N 2°04′0.83″W

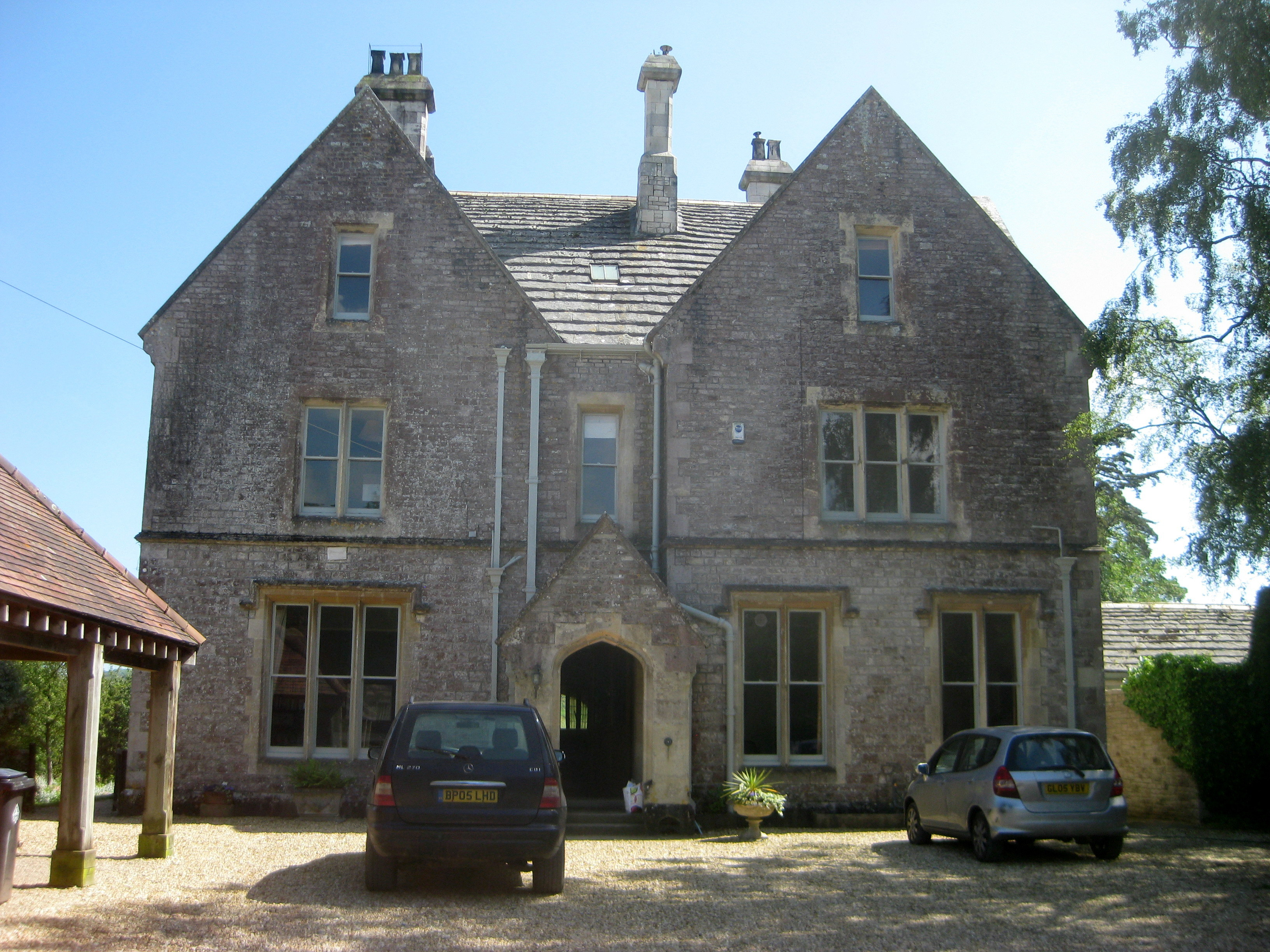
Bucknowle House

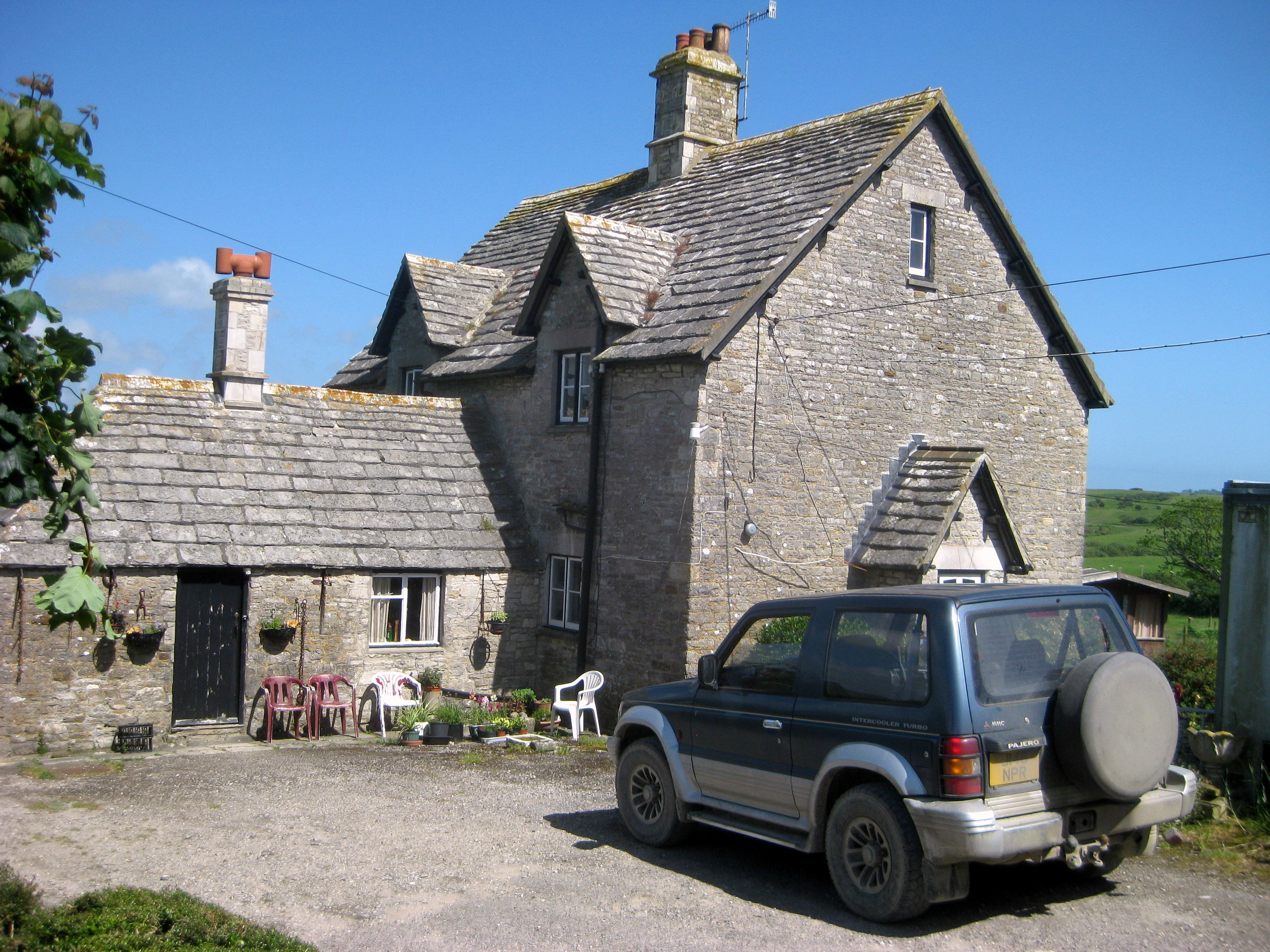
Bucknowle Farmhouse

Bucknowle Farm is the site of a Romano-British settlement and a Roman villa, located 1 km (0.62 mi) southeast of Church Knowle and 1 km (0.62 mi) southwest of Corfe Castle village in Dorset, England (grid reference SY95368146). It is about 7 km (4.3 mi) south of Wareham and approximately 9 km (5.6 mi) west of Swanage in the heart of the Isle of Purbeck.

A number of Romano-British sites have been discovered and studied on the Isle of Purbeck. The Romano-British villa complex found at Bucknowle Farm is the first substantial villa to be found south of the Purbeck Hills. It was excavated between 1976 and 1991.

The first signs to its existence were unearthed in 1975 as fragments of pottery were found in a field. The excavations, that subsequently lasted until the summer of 1991, conclusively revealed a complex of domestic and farmstead buildings. Moreover, beneath these, a more complicated system of Iron Age and early Roman Age habitation was uncovered.

There is a camping site within the grounds of Bucknowle Farm.
