= Rutland Roman villa =

Roman villa in Rutland, England

Coordinates: 52°37′01″N 0°34′23″W

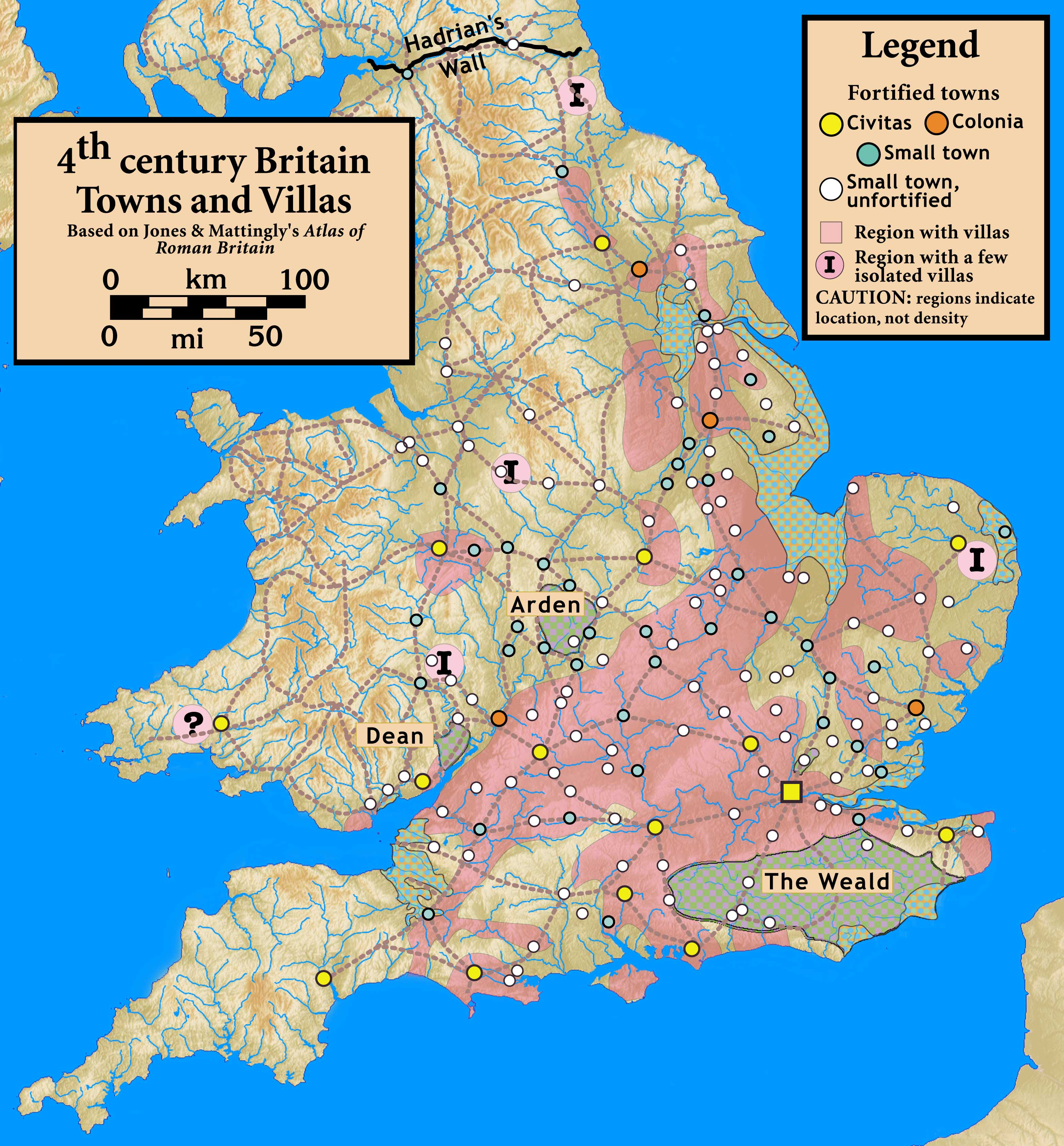
Roman Britain: towns and villas

The Rutland Roman villa is a Romano-British villa site near Ketton in Rutland, England. The site was listed as a scheduled monument by Historic England on 23 November 2021. The villa includes the first example of a Roman mosaic in Britain which depicts scenes from the Trojan War.

A geophysical survey of the site in 2021 showed evidence of a large villa complex including indications of a formal garden, a bath house, perhaps a chapel and two mausolea. Further excavations in 2022 uncovered the bath house as well as a second mosaic, possibly from a dining area of the villa.

This type of large luxurious villa complex is unusual in this part of Roman Britain (see List of Roman villas in England)

== Discovery ==
The site was first identified from cropmarks visible on Google Earth in June 2018. In 2020 (during the COVID-19 pandemic in England), Jim Irvine, the son of the landowner, identified some "unusual pottery" whilst walking through the site and dug a small trench. Historic England subsequently funded an urgent excavation of the site by University of Leicester Archaeological Service in August 2020. In September 2021, the University of Leicester carried out a second series of excavations, exposing the entire mosaic.

== Villa ==
The villa complex is likely to be a villa rustica comprising luxurious residential buildings and agricultural buildings. A geophysical survey has shown it comprises at least seven buildings, including the main residential villa, all enclosed by a series of ditches.

Initially thought to date to the 3rd or 4th century AD, further excavations in the summer of 2022 suggested that the estate had been first occupied more than a century earlier.

=== Main residential villa ===
The main villa is thought to be a corridor villa with double portico arranged around an internal garden and wings at each end.

The triclinium (dining room) and mosaic were the main discoveries in 2021. Excavations in 2022 found, in the western corridor, fragments of a mosaic floor in a collapsed underfloor heating system, while the eastern corridor retained a polychrome geometric mosaic floor. Also many details of elaborate decoration were found including wall and floor decoration with frescoed wall plaster, marble fragments and stone columns.

==== Triclinium ====
The dining room with the Hector mosaic was a later addition to the main villa for public feasting, suggesting that the owners wanted to impress with their wealth and Roman culture.

The mosaic measures 11 metres (36 ft) by nearly 7 metres (23 ft). The mosaic is made up of four rectangular sections, one decorated with guilloche; the other three depicting scenes from the Trojan War concerning Achilles killing Hector and ransoming his body. The first panel shows Achilles and Hector fighting from their chariots. In the second, Achilles drags Hector's body behind his chariot, while Hector's father Priam and an unidentified figure, possibly a Greek soldier, look on. The third panel, which is badly damaged by fire, shows Priam paying a ransom for Hector's body.

It was thought to be the first example of imagery from Homer's Iliad discovered from Roman Britain and one of only a few in the whole of Europe (such as the Villa Romana del Tellaro in Sicily). Further research by Jane Masséglia and a team from the University of Leicester has determined the piece presented an alternative version of the Trojan War story, told by the Greek playwright Aeschylus in the Phrygians, and the imagery followed models from the Mediterranean world. It indicates that the owner had a refined taste, knowledge of classical literature and wanted to express it publicly.

=== Large hall building ===
Excavations in 2022 revealed a large hall building about 50 m away from the main villa. It was originally a timber barn for a farm with large timber posts supporting two storeys. It was converted into a stone building in the 3rd or 4th century with one end becoming a thermal bath suite and also residential rooms, while the other end was still used for agriculture or workshops.

== See also ==
- Roman villas in Rutland
