= Hurcott Farm =

Geological site in Somerset, England

- Site of Special Scientific Interest
- Location within Somerset
- Location of Hurcott Farm.
- Area of search: Somerset
- Grid reference: ST511295
- Coordinates: 51.06274°N 2.69918°W
- Interest: Geological
- Area: 26.3 hectares (0.263 km^{2}; 0.102 sq mi)
- Notification date: 1993

Hurcott Farm (grid reference ST511295) is a 26.3 hectare geological Site of Special Scientific Interest in Somerset, notified in 1993.

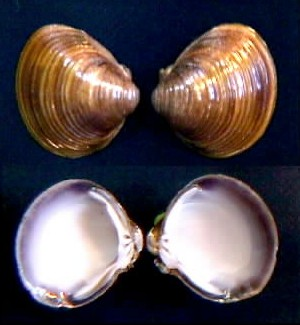
Corbicula fluminalis

At this site heavily cemented Pleistocene terrace gravels of the River Cary have yielded an abundant freshwater and terrestrial molluscan fauna. The fauna has an interglacial aspect, and includes Corbicula fluminalis and Pisidium clessini. This site is of critical importance as the keystone of the Pleistocene stratigraphy of southern Somerset, and as a freshwater facies-equivalent of the Burtle Beds.

== Sources ==
- English Nature citation sheet for the site (accessed 10 August 2006)
