= Lockleys Roman Villa =

Coordinates: 51.8307°N 0.2052°W

Lockleys Roman Villa is a ruined Roman villa on the Lockleys estate near Welwyn, Hertfordshire. The site was excavated in 1937. This is one of two known villas near Welwyn, the other being Dicket Mead.

The excavations uncovered five phases of a Roman farmhouse that flourished from the first to the fourth century AD. The earliest remains date into the first century AD and belong to a round hut, about 4 meter in diameter. Over the hut was found a thick layer of humus that indicates a next building phase. No architectural remains were found, but the excavator assumes that there was a timber building at this place.

From about AD 60-70 comes the third building phase. The house was now totally rebuilt in stone. It was oriented north–south and consisted of a row of three bigger rooms, with two smaller rooms on the North side. Around AD 150 the villa was heavily enlarged. On the west side was added a veranda with additional rooms on either short end of the veranda. Due to ploughing the floors of the rooms were never preserved, making it hard for the archaeologist to find datable material in context with the floors

In the early fourth century the building was devastated by a fire. After the fire, the house was for a while not rebuilt. Around AD 330 a new villa was erected, ignoring the old walls. Only parts of the new villa were found showing that it was a square house with several rooms, built over the south end of the older structures. At the end of the fourth century, the villa was abandoned.

== Conservation ==
There are no visible remains of the villa. The site was scheduled in 1997.
