= Abermagwr =

Village in Ceredigion, Wales

Coordinates: 52.345°N 3.960°W

- Location within Ceredigion
- OS grid reference: SN665737
- Principal area: Ceredigion
- Preserved county: Dyfed
- Country: Wales
- Sovereign state: United Kingdom
- Post town: ABERYSTWYTH
- Postcode district: SY23
- Dialling code: 01974
- Police: Dyfed-Powys
- Fire: Mid and West Wales
- Ambulance: Welsh
- UK Parliament: Ceredigion Preseli
- Senedd Cymru – Welsh Parliament: Ceredigion Penfro

Abermagwr is a small settlement in the county of Ceredigion, Wales. It is on the B4340 road and is 11 kilometres (7 mi) southeast of the town of Aberystwyth.

== Roman villa ==
In 2006 the remains of a Roman villa were discovered on land in Abermagwr from aerial photography, and the site was excavated in 2010 and 2011, with a final season undertaken in July 2015 to investigate the courtyard west of the villa. Until the discovery of the Roman villa in Abermagwr it was believed by archaeologists that Ceredigion was a military zone, unsettled by the Romano-British. The Roman villa is the first and only one of its kind discovered in Ceredigion and is the most remote Roman villa in Wales. It was home to Ceredigion's earliest slated roof, parts of which are on display along with excavated finds in the Ceredigion Museum, Aberystwyth. An ornate Roman cut glass vessel from the Rheinland, found in the rear room of the villa, is unique in Wales.
