= Gayton Thorpe Roman Villa =

- Location within Norfolk
- 52°43′57.360″N 0°34′11.154″E
- Location: near Gayton Thorpe
- OS grid reference: TF 73576 18030

Site notes
- Excavation dates: 1922, 1923, 2006

Scheduled monument
- Designated: 1925
- Reference no.: 1003975

Gayton Thorpe Roman Villa is the site of a Roman villa, near Gayton Thorpe and about 5 miles (8 km) east of King's Lynn, in Norfolk, England. It was discovered in 1906 and first excavated in the 1920s, when two winged corridor buildings were found. The site is a scheduled monument.

== Description ==
=== Discovery ===
The site is about 500 metres (1,600 ft) from a tributary of the River Nar. Pottery was found on the field in 1906, and tesserae and other Roman objects were revealed by ploughing in 1922.

=== 1920s excavation ===
W. L. Charlton began excavation of the site in that year, and uncovered four of the rooms in the north block and one in the south. On Charlton's sudden death, work ceased until 1923, when Donald Atkinson (1886–1963) completed the excavation. He established that the north block was a corridor building which included a bathhouse and a room with an elaborate mosaic floor, and in other rooms there were only the remains of hypocaust pillars. The south block, thought to be later, was simpler and not well preserved; there were the remains of a mosaic floor in one room. There was a room, built later, joining the two blocks. Three third-century coins and some Samian ware were found at the site. Atkinson suggested that the buildings date from the mid-second century to the early fourth century.

=== Later investigation ===
Aerial photographs of the 1970s showed that there was a detached bathhouse to the south, and that there was a boundary ditch enclosing the buildings, with an entrance road on the west shown by its flanking ditches.

Ploughing in 1966 revealed hypocaust tiles and pink mortar about 70 yards (64 m) south of the site, providing evidence of the detached bathhouse. Systematic fieldwalking from 1983 to 1985 produced more finds from the location of the bathhouse, and concentrations in other areas suggested the presence of two buildings east of the villa. Pottery finds date from the mid-second century to the fourth century, as earlier suggested by Atkinson's excavation.

A further excavation of the site took place in 2006, involving geophysical surveying to investigate buildings not documented in the 1920s.
