= Bucknowle Roman villa =

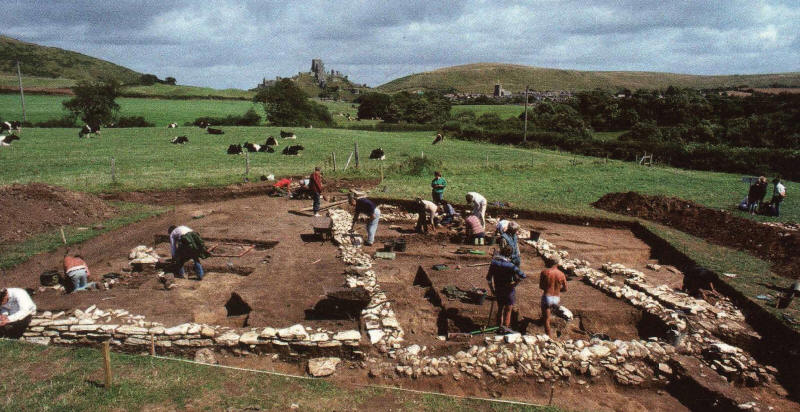
- Bucknowle Roman villa during the excavations between 1976 and 1991
- Interactive map of the Bucknowle Roman villa area

General information
- Location: Bucknowle Farm grid reference SY95368146, United Kingdom
- Coordinates: 50°37′58.3″N 2°04′0.83″W
- Construction started: late 1st century
- Demolished: shortly after c. 410 AD

Bucknowle Roman villa is a Roman villa in Dorset, England. It is located within a camping site within the grounds of Bucknowle Farm.

== History ==
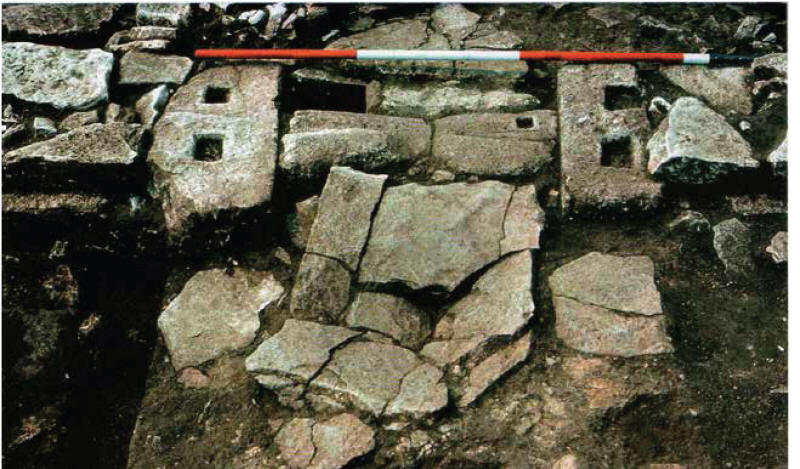
Excavated in situ doorstones of Bucknowle Roman villa, 1977

The first villa was constructed on the site during the late 1st century AD. A large aisled hall and a possible bath house were built during the first phase of construction.

The aisled hall remained in use until at least the mid 2nd to early 3rd centuries before being rebuilt, and also around this time, a new bath house was constructed alongside six timber-framed buildings which were most likely farm buildings or workshops.

By the late 3rd century, many of the wooden buildings had been rebuilt and enlarged and a new domestic block built up from three rooms was now the largest building on the site, and excavations found roof and flue tiles alongside limestone slabs used for the floor.

During the 4th century, the site contained three large buildings and a bath house, and the wooden buildings went out of use by the year 300 AD. On the site of the wooden buildings was a large building separate from the two other ranges, and excavations revealed that it had heated floors, mosaic pavements and a tessellated floor. It was also connected to the bath house and the second aisled hall, making it the main domestic range of the villa complex.

When the Romans withdrew from Britain in 410 AD, the villa complex was abandoned shortly after and the site was eventually reverted back to farmland during the Anglo-Saxon era.

Bucknowle House was eventually built on the site of the villa complex.

== Excavation ==
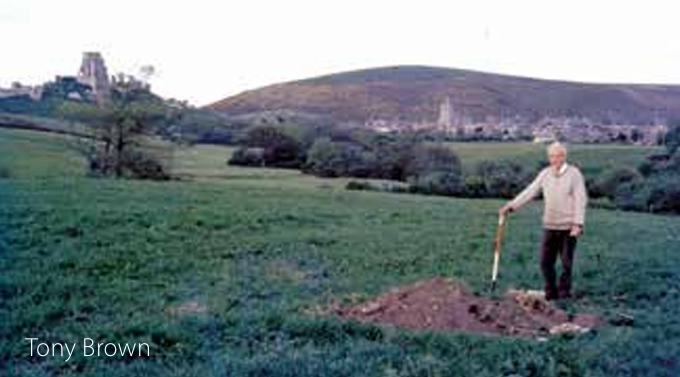
Tony Brown on the site of the villa, c. 1975

A number of Romano-British sites have been discovered and studied on the Isle of Purbeck. The Bucknowle Roman villa found at Bucknowle Farm is the first substantial villa to be found south of the Purbeck Hills. It was excavated between 1976 and 1991.

The first signs to its existence were unearthed in 1975 after fragments of pottery were found in a field by Tony Brown, who was allowed to dig a small trench in the area. The excavations, that subsequently lasted until the summer of 1991, conclusively revealed a complex of domestic and farmstead buildings. Moreover, beneath these, a more complicated system of Iron Age and early Roman Age habitation was uncovered, including the remains of Iron Age graves.

Many artefacts have been recovered from the site, including 213+ coins, many roof and flue tiles, bracelets, brooches and pottery, just to name a few.

== Gallery ==
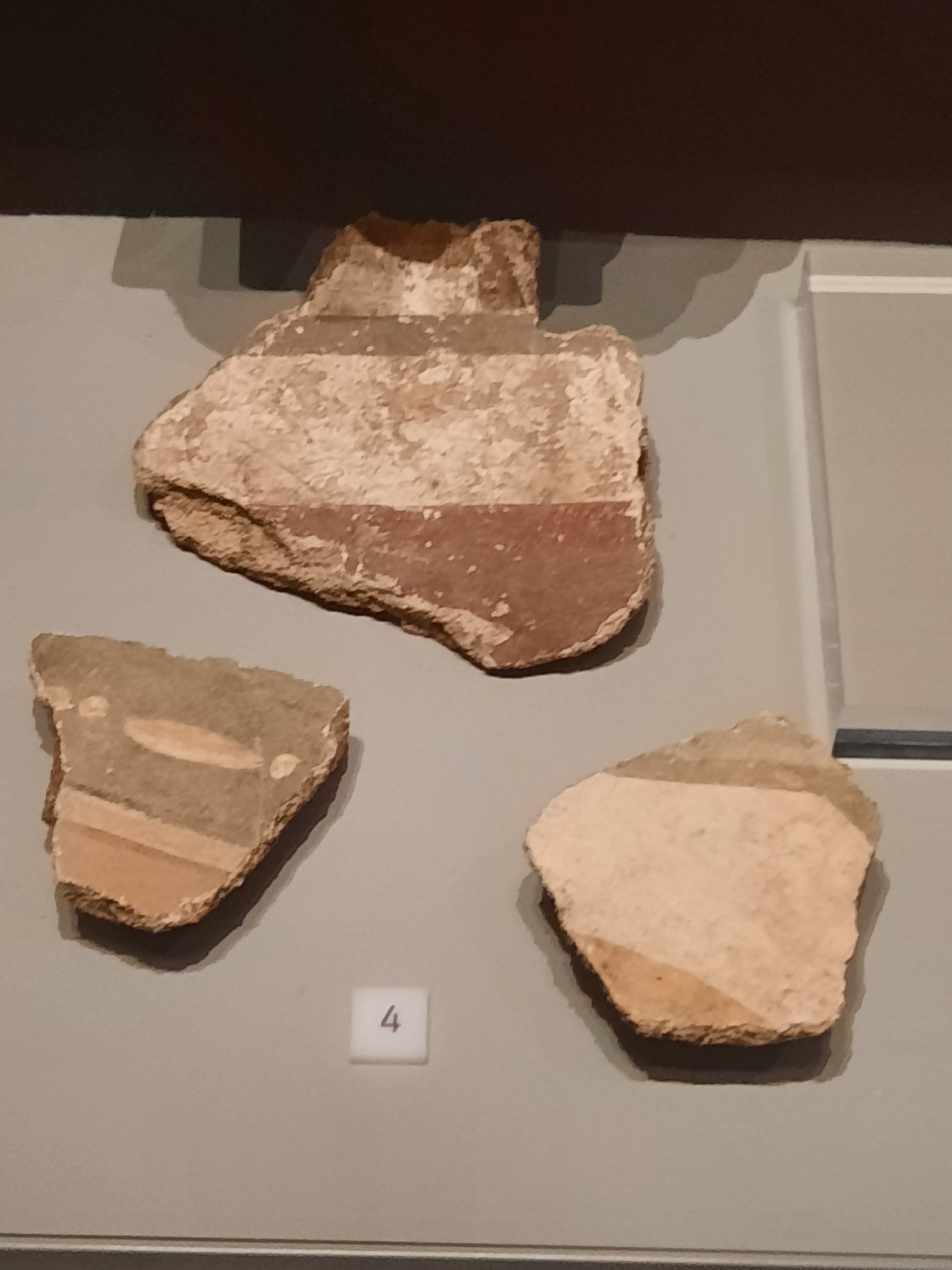
Painted wall plaster fragments from Bucknowle Roman villa dating to the 3rd century

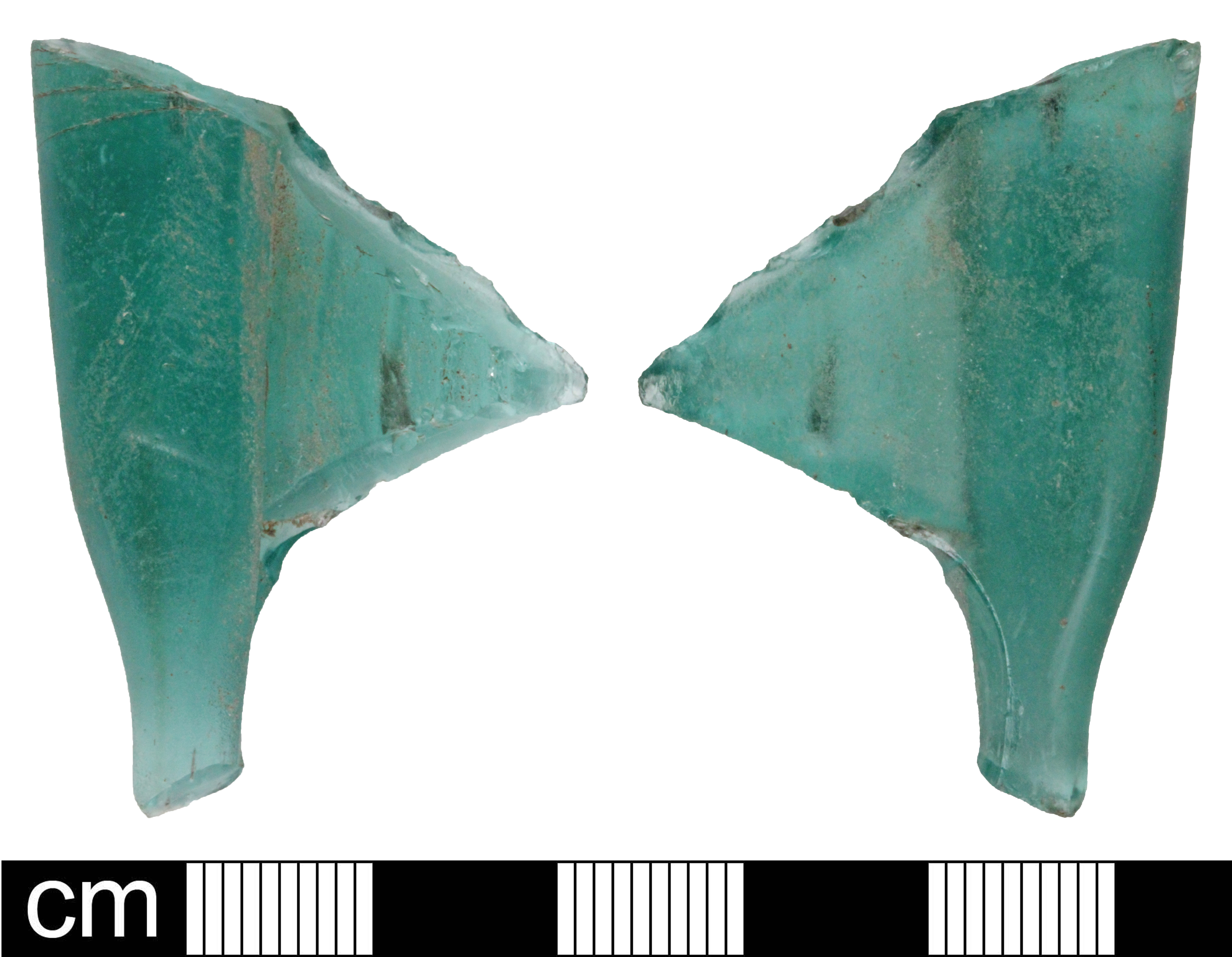
Flagon handle from Bucknowle Roman villa

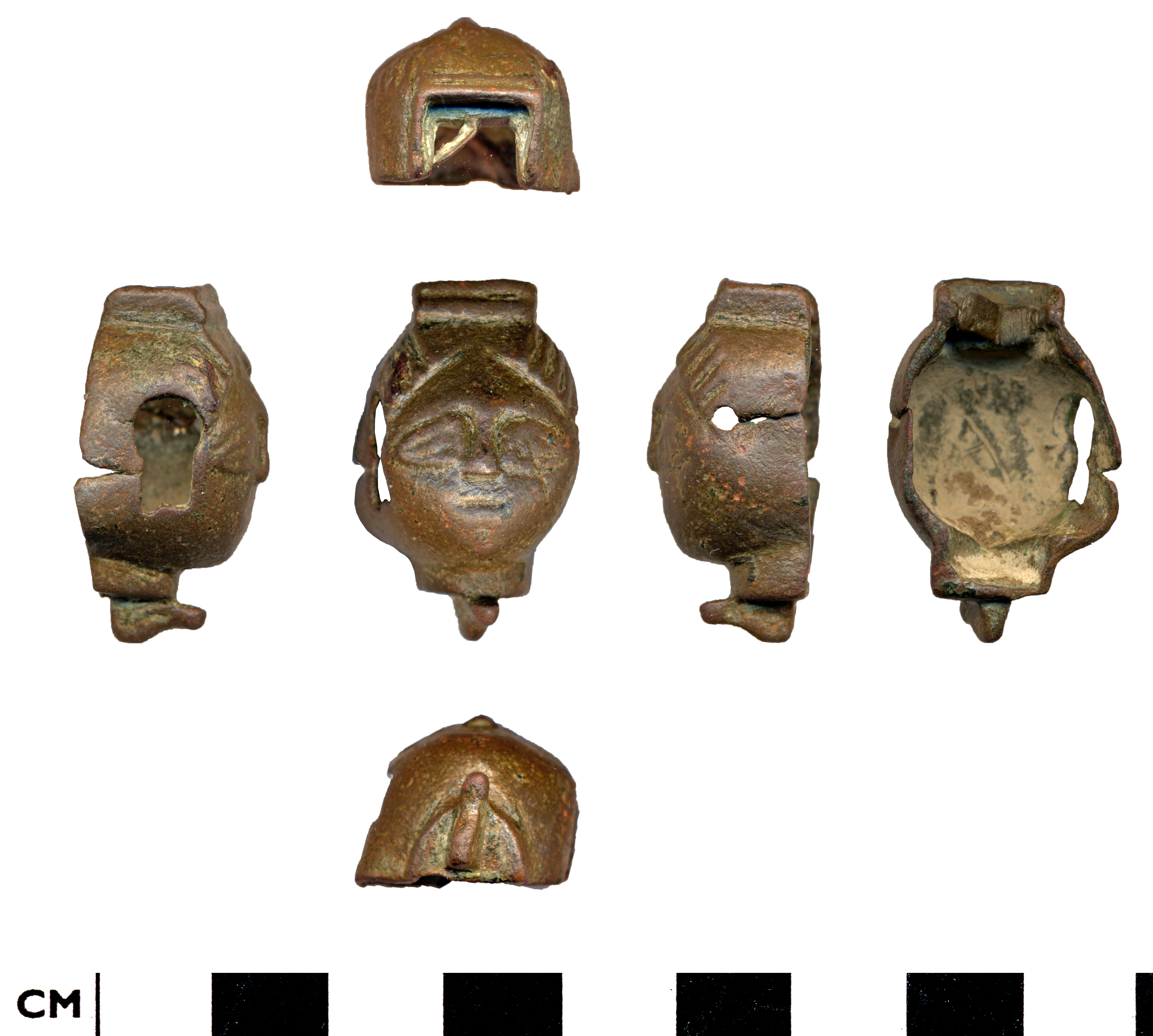
Possible padlock from Bucknowle Roman villa, dates to no later than 300 AD

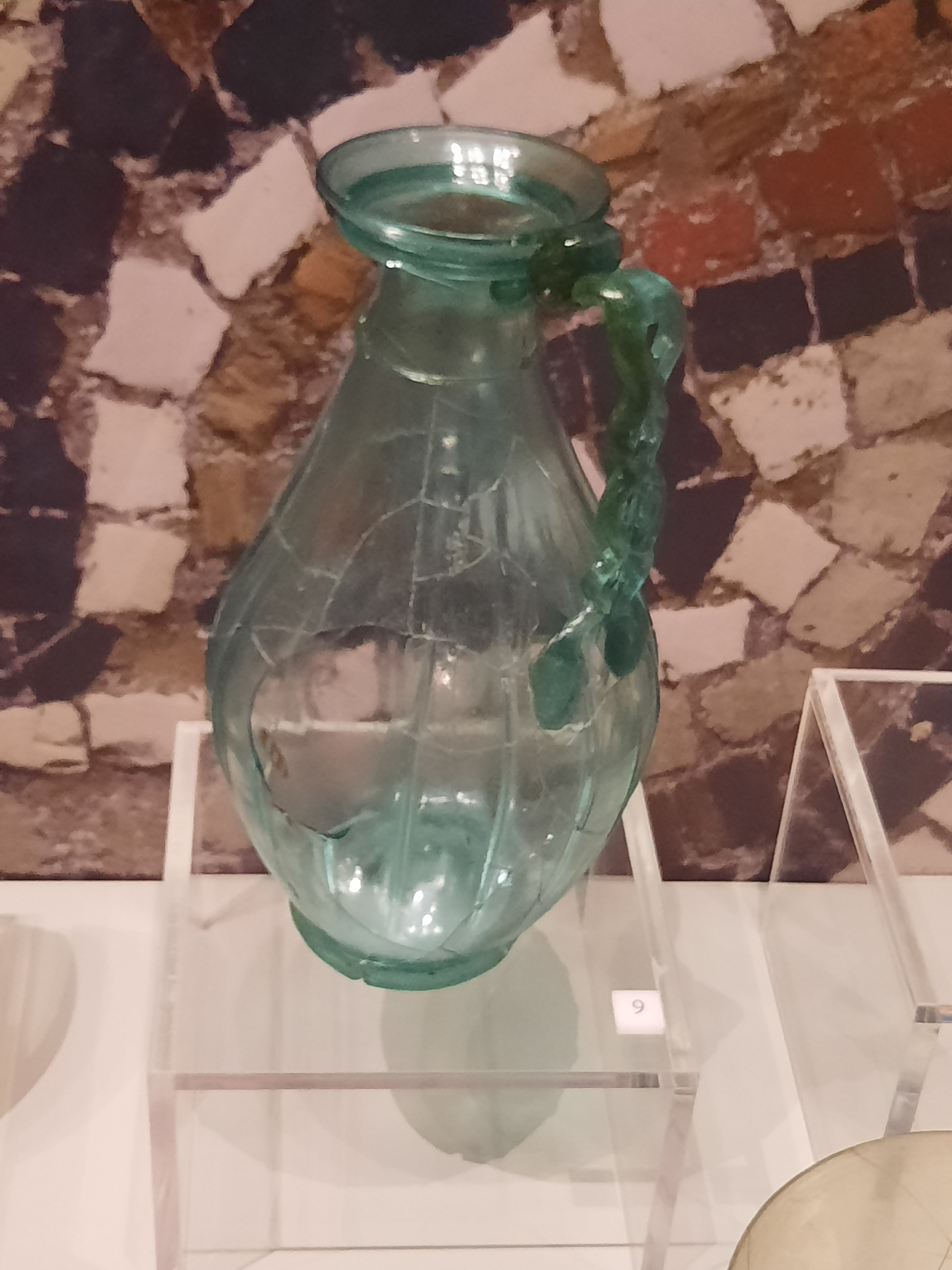
Mid 3rd to mid 4th century glass jug from Bucknowle Roman villa that is one of the finest examples of Roman glassware discovered in England

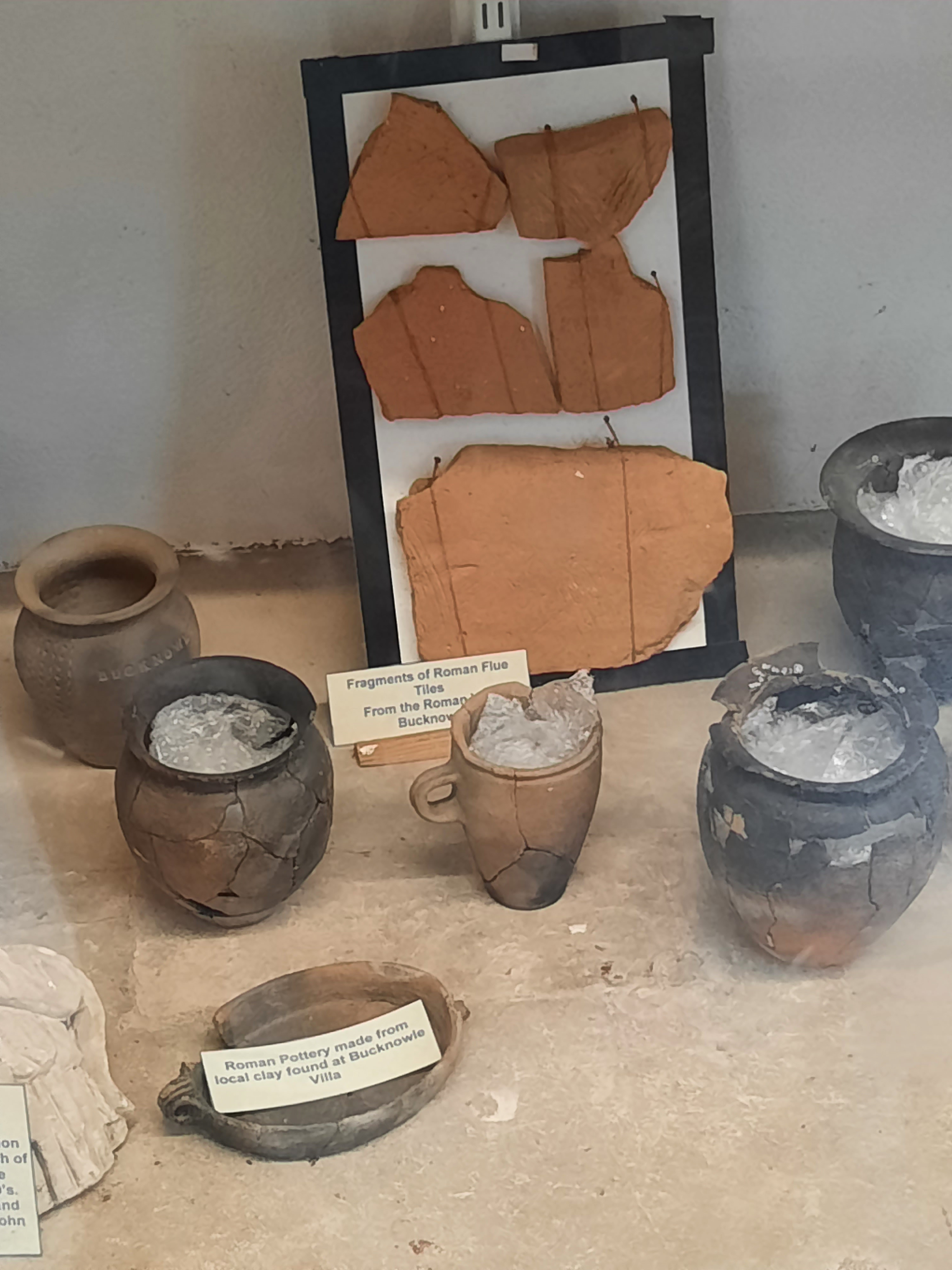
Flue tiles and pottery discovered in the villa, likely dating to the late 3rd century
