= Gayton Thorpe =

Village in Norfolk, England

Coordinates: 52.73°N 0.57°E

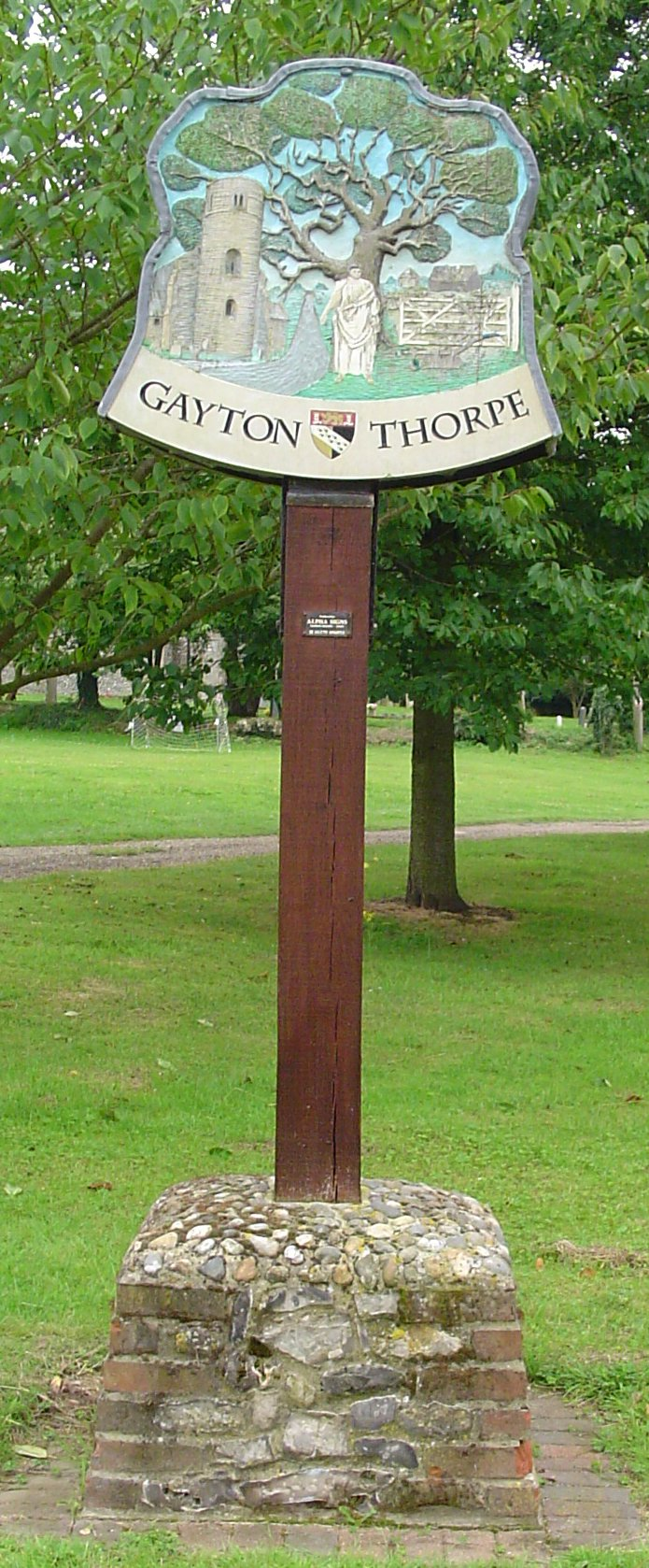
- Signpost in Gayton Thorpe

- Location within Norfolk
  - London: 89 miles (143 km)
- Civil parish: Gayton
- District: King's Lynn and West Norfolk
- Shire county: Norfolk
- Region: East
- Country: England
- Sovereign state: United Kingdom
- Post town: King's Lynn
- Postcode district: PE32
- Dialling code: 01553
- UK Parliament: North West Norfolk

Gayton Thorpe is a village and former civil parish, now in the parish of Gayton, in the King's Lynn and West Norfolk district, in the county of Norfolk, England. The village is located 7.1 miles (11.4 km) south-east of King's Lynn and 31 miles (50 km) north-west of Norwich. In 1931 the parish had a population of 136.

== History ==
Gayton Thorpe's name is of Viking origin and derives from the Old Norse for Gayton's outlying farmstead or settlement.

Gayton Thorpe was recorded in the Domesday Book as T(h)orp. In the Domesday Book, Gayton Thorpe is listed as a settlement of 43 households in the hundred of Freebridge. In 1086, the village was divided between the estates of Bishop Odo of Bayeux, Roger Bigod, Henry de Ferrers and Ralph de Tosny.

Near the village is the site of Gayton Thorpe Roman Villa, discovered and first excavated in the early 20th century.

On 1 April 1935 the parish was abolished and merged with Gayton.

== Geography ==
Gayton Thorpe falls within the constituency of North West Norfolk and is represented at Parliament by James Wild MP of the Conservative Party.

== St Mary's Church ==
Gayton Thorpe's parish church is dedicated to Saint Mary and is one of Norfolk's 124 existing round-tower churches. St Mary's also features a medieval font depicting the Seven Sacraments, and is Grade I listed.
