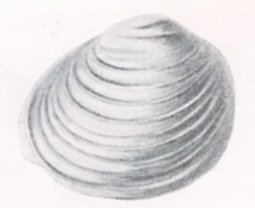
- Pisidium clessini
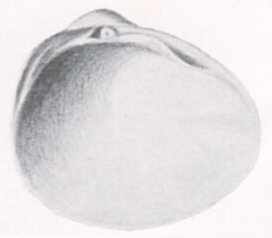
- Pisidium clessini

Scientific classification
- Domain: Eukaryota
- Kingdom: Animalia
- Phylum: Mollusca
- Class: Bivalvia
- Order: Sphaeriida
- Family: Sphaeriidae
- Genus: Pisidium
- Species: P. clessini

Binomial name
- Pisidium clessini Neumayr, 1875

= Pisidium clessini =

Species of bivalve

Pisidium clessini is a species of extinct freshwater bivalve from family Sphaeriidae.

== Description ==
The shell has an oval form with somewhat prominent umbo, that is situated behind the middle. There is a distinct concentric rib structure. The ribs are sharp and are separated by relatively big spaces. There are two (sometimes three) strong accentuated ribs near the Umbo, that gradually become less accentuated to the sides. These ribs are a distinct characteristic of the species. The ribs can be faded in certain cases, but the accentuated ribs are always there. Radial ribs are not present. The inner rim of the shell is smooth and is not crenulated. The shell of this species has a somewhat variable shape and sometimes does look a lot like Pisidium amnicum.

Measurements of the shell:

- length: up to 7,8 mm.
- width: up to 6,5 mm.
- semi diameter: up to 2,2 mm.

== Ecology ==
Pisidium clessini only lived in streaming and moving water.

=== Distribution ===
The species is extinct, but was widely spread in Europe from the beginning of the Pliocene, but mainly during interglacials of the early and middle Pleistocene.
