= Upper Wootton =

Village in Hampshire, England

Coordinates: 51.288265°N 1.1693°W

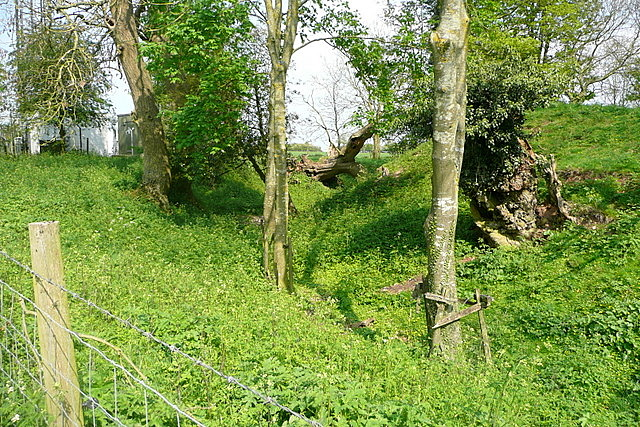
- Woodgarston Motte

- Location within Hampshire
- OS grid reference: SU5802654675
- Civil parish: Wootton St Lawrence with Ramsdell
- District: Basingstoke and Deane
- Shire county: Hampshire
- Region: South East
- Country: England
- Sovereign state: United Kingdom
- Post town: TADLEY
- Postcode district: RG26 5
- Dialling code: 01256
- Police: Hampshire and Isle of Wight
- Fire: Hampshire and Isle of Wight
- Ambulance: South Central
- UK Parliament: Basingstoke

Upper Wootton is a hamlet in the civil parish of Wootton St Lawrence with Ramsdell in the Basingstoke and Deane district of Hampshire, England. Its nearest town is Tadley, which lies approximately 4.8 miles 6.2 miles (10.0 km) northeast from the village.

Half a mile north-east of the village is the overgrown ring motte known as Woodgarston Castle, a possible location for the 'Castle of the Wood' recorded as having been stormed by King Stephen in 1147.
