= Spoonley Wood Roman Villa =

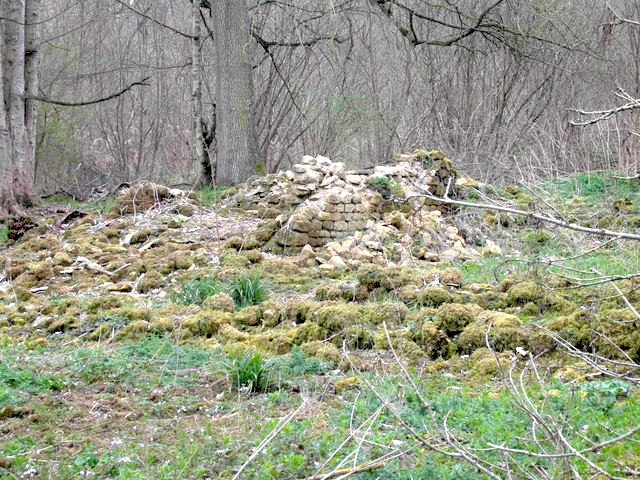
- Ruins in Spoonley Wood

- Location within Gloucestershire

General information
- Location: Sudeley grid reference SP04502568, United Kingdom
- Coordinates: 51.92943°N 1.93611°W

Spoonley Wood Roman Villa is an ancient Roman villa located 2 km south-east of Sudeley Castle near the town of Winchcombe, in Gloucestershire, England. It was a courtyard-type villa excavated in 1882. Some remains of the villa, partly reconstructed, can still be seen in Spoonley Wood, and one mosaic is viewable under a corrugated iron roof.

== History ==
The villa lies between two streams on a north-west facing slope. It measured 55 by 61 metres (180 ft × 200 ft) and was a courtyard villa. The remains of a basilican-type building, thought to be a barn or granary were found 15–18 metres (49–59 ft) away. Another Roman villa was discovered 2 km to the west at Wadfield Farm in 1863.

The building began as a corridor villa, and was later converted by the addition of two wings extending to the north-west which were built at each end. This winged villa was later turned into a courtyard villa by the addition of an enclosing wall to the north-west which connected the two wings. Spoonley Wood villa is often cited as the archetypal example of this sequence as it was the first with this sequence to be discovered, although the dating evidence from the Spoonley Wood villa is poor.

== Discovery and display ==
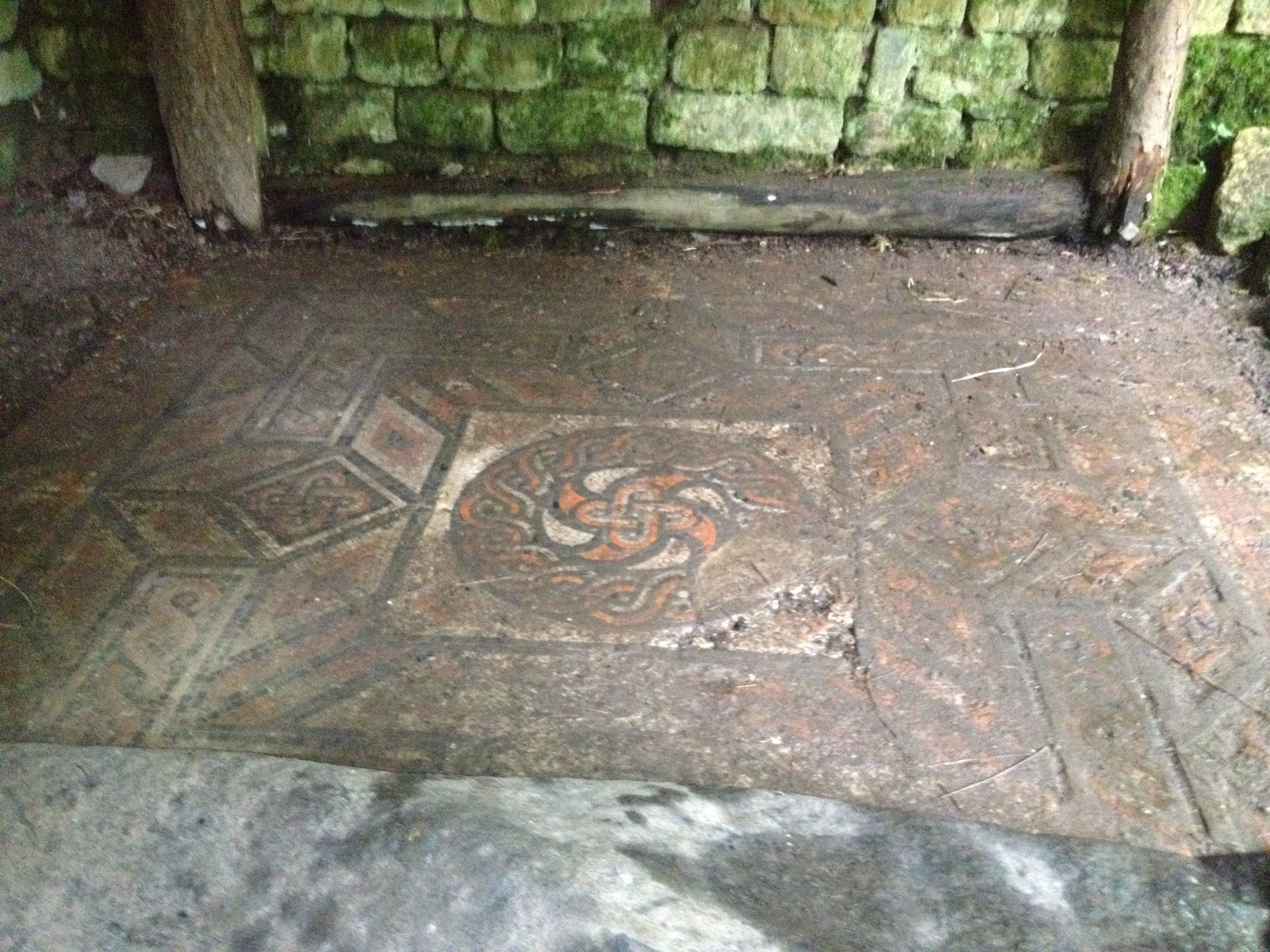
Mosaic visible under shelter

Structural remains had been noticed in the wood before 1877, but it was only in 1882 that workmen, searching for stone, uncovered one of the rooms of the villa. The site was in the ownership of Emma Dent, the owner of nearby Sudeley Castle, who had a mosaic lifted and moved to the castle. The site was subsequently excavated by the antiquarians John Henry Middleton and William Bazeley. For two years the site lay open, during which time it was damaged by frost, rabbits, and visitors. In response to the damage, Emma Dent chose to partially rebuild the walls, up to 1.8 metres high in places on the east and south sides, and to reconstruct two of the remaining mosaics and cover them with wooden sheds. The huts had become ruinous by 1945, and in 1976 it was reported that "the sheds have now collapsed and the remains are suffering from weather and from the encroaching wood."

Finds from the excavations included a silver-plated bronze bowl, a large number of 3rd- and 4th-century coins, samian ware pottery, iron knives and tools. Most of the finds are at Sudeley Castle. A column base is in Gloucester Museum and three pottery lamps are in Cheltenham Museum. A marble statue of Bacchus, from a grave, is now in the British Museum.

As of 2013 the site is obscured by the trees of Spoonley Wood, but the walls are still clearly visible, and one of the reconstructed mosaics can be viewed "protected beneath a small corrugated iron roof and some plastic sheeting held in place with stones".
