= Welwyn Roman Baths =

Roman ruin in England

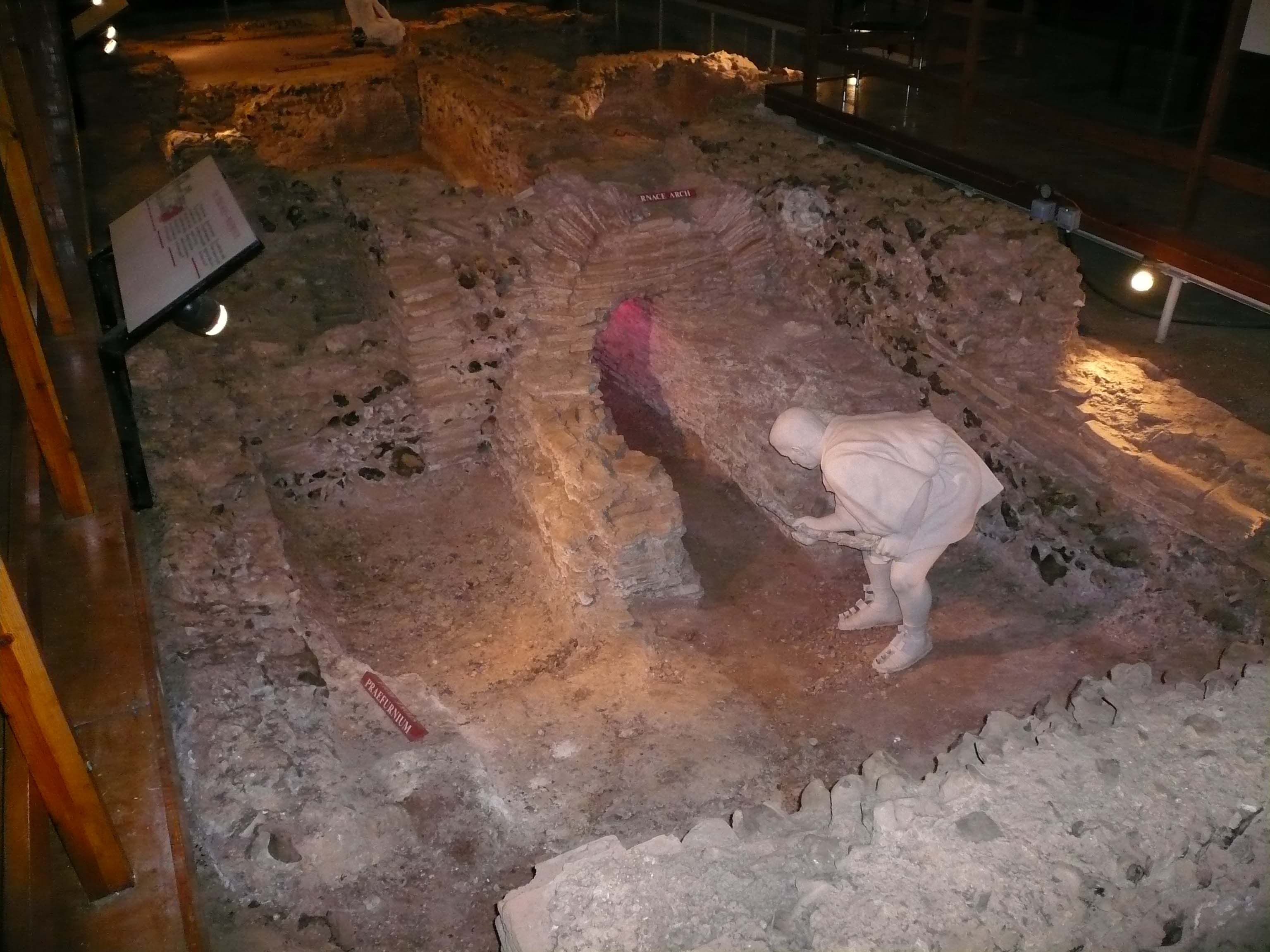
- Photograph of the baths. Rooms intended to be the warmest were located nearest to the furnace.

- Location within Hertfordshire Location within the United Kingdom Location within Europe
- 51.8277°N 0.2081°W
- Type: Roman
- Periods: Roman Empire
- Location: Welwyn Garden City, Hertfordshire, England

The Welwyn Roman Baths are a Roman ruin preserved under the A1(M) just north of modern-day Welwyn Garden City, Hertfordshire, England. The baths were a small part of the Dicket Mead villa, which was originally built in the 3rd century AD.

The village of Welwyn has been described as being the site of a Romano-British settlement, where a Roman road crossed the river Mimram. There was another Roman villa near Welwyn on the Lockleys estate.

The full extent of the Dicket Mead villa was never fully excavated prior to the construction of the motorway, but the baths were only one of at least four buildings in total. The complex was probably part of a farm. It has been speculated that it might have been at least in part the equivalent of a hotel, lying as it does near Roman roads.

The ruins were uncovered in 1960 by local archaeologist Tony Rook, and the baths were gradually uncovered over the following 10 years by excavation. Shortly after the excavation was completed, the Ministry of Transport announced the route of a new motorway, straight over the top of the excavation.

== Access ==
Eventually arrangements were made whereby a steel vault would be built over the top of the baths with an access tunnel for the public. Once the vault was completed the motorway was built over the top of it, and the remains of the baths sit 9 metres below junction 6. Only about half of the original extent of the baths is now on display. Visible parts remaining include the hypocaust, the tepidarium (warm room), caldarium (hot room) and the frigidarium (cold room) floor and cold bath, constructed from opus signinum.

Once the vault was finished, the bulk of the remaining parts of the Dicket Mead villa were covered over by the roadworks. Archaeological material from the site is stored at Mill Green Museum, part of Welwyn Hatfield Museum Service, which also operates the baths. This stored material can be inspected by contacting the curator.

== Images ==
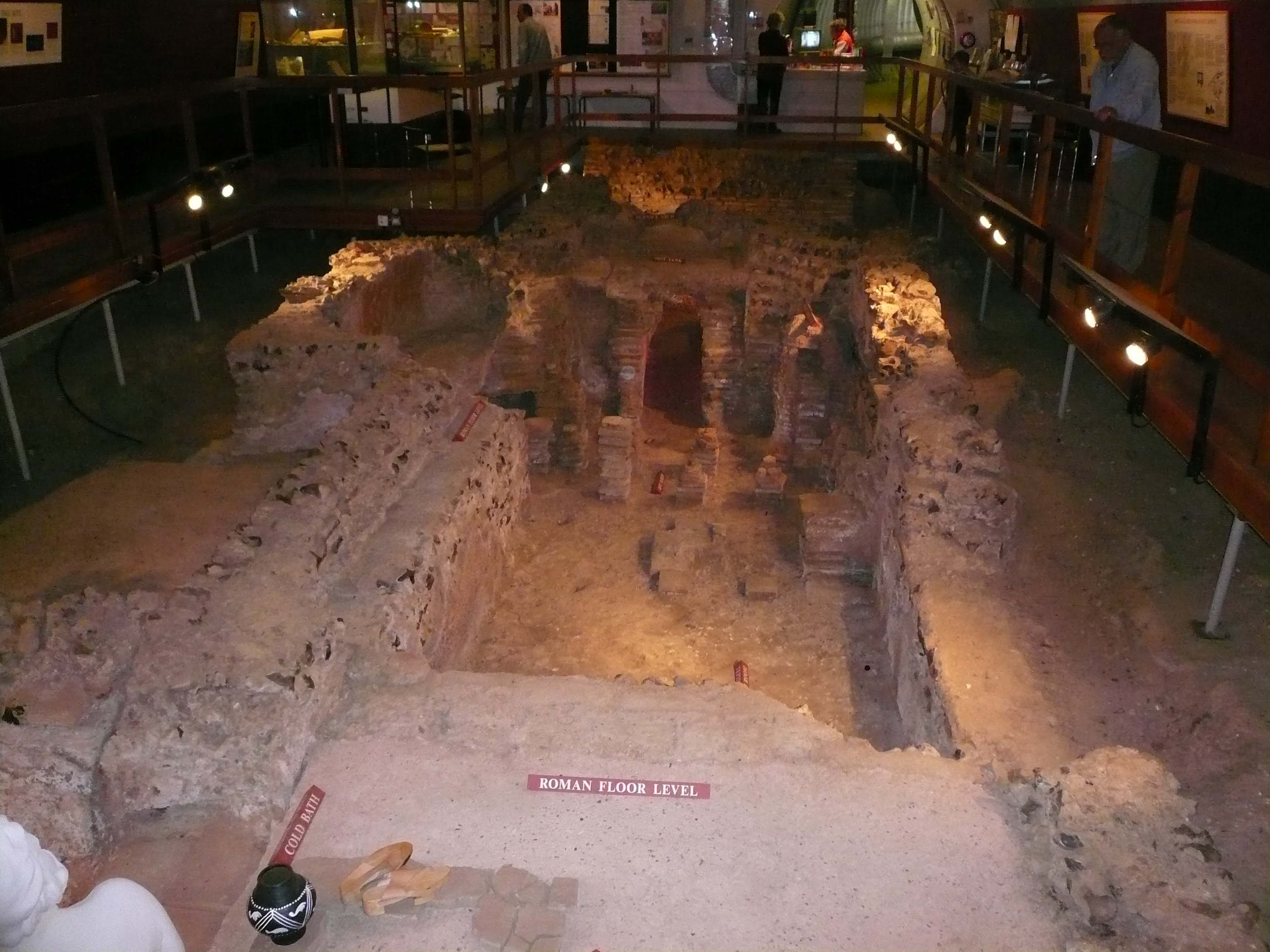
View along the hypocaust

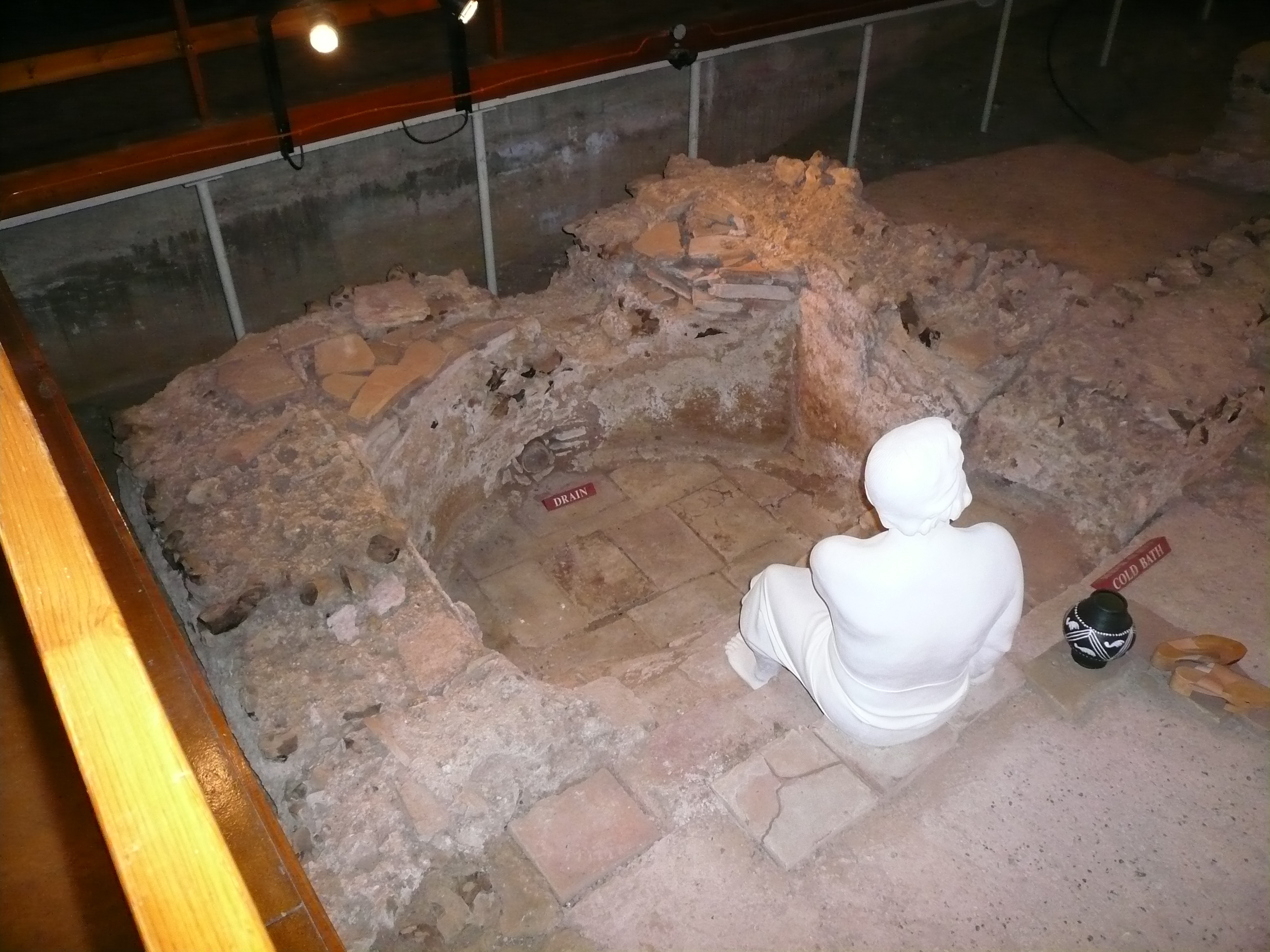
Statue model sitting on the opus signinum

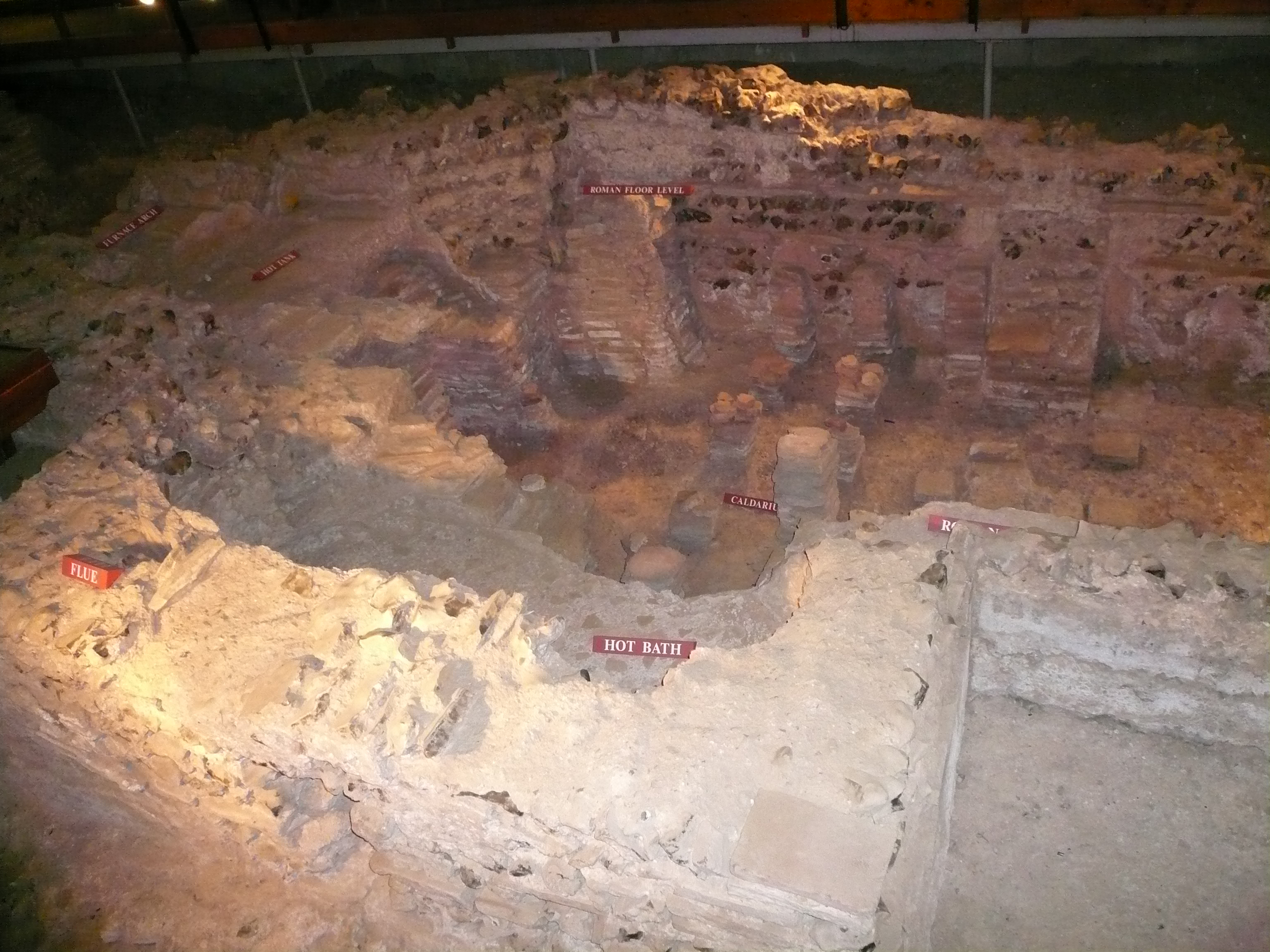
Side view

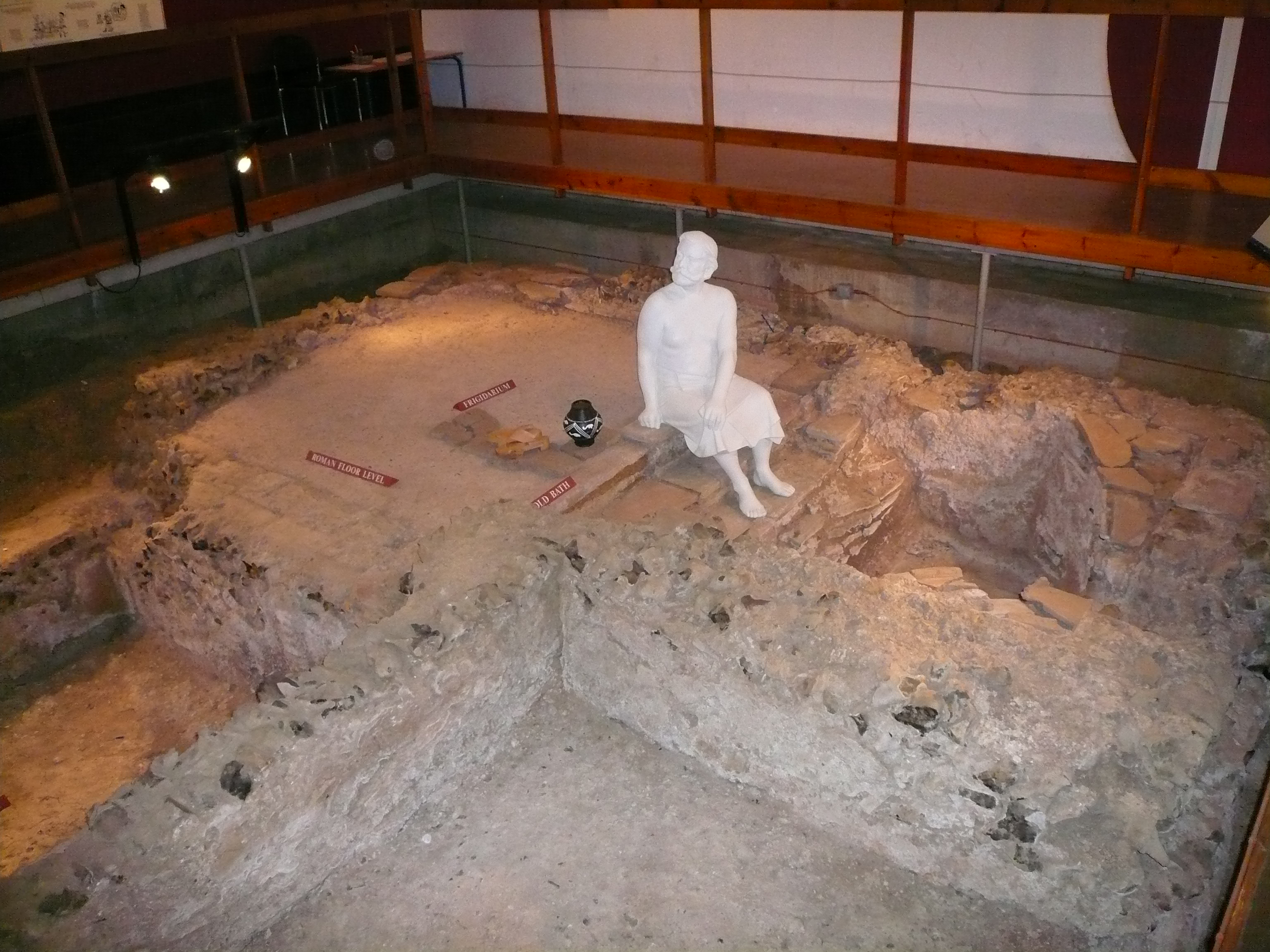
Quarter view

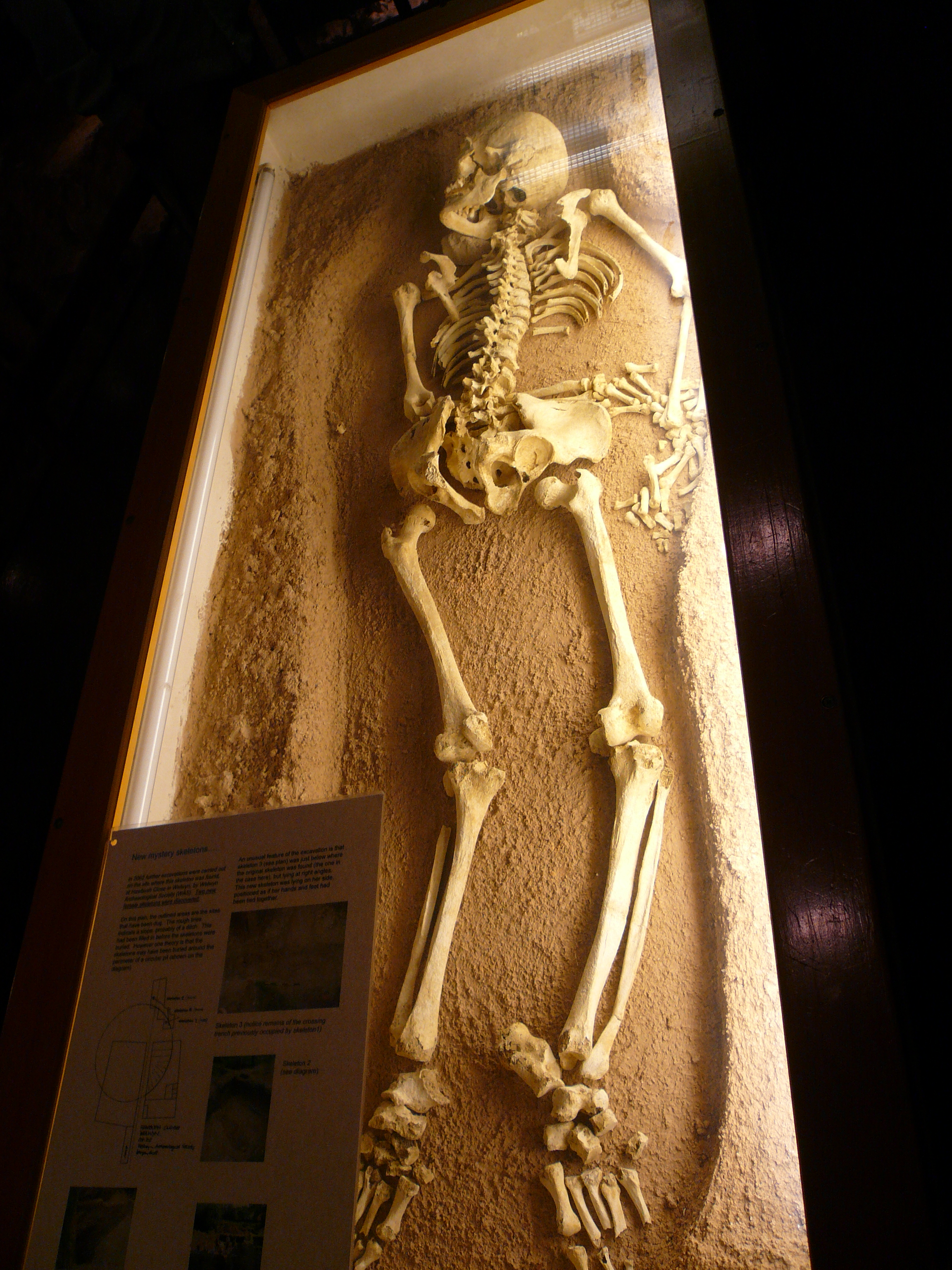
The skeletal remains of a woman buried on the Dicket Mead site.

== See also ==
- List of Roman public baths
