= Battle of Piercebridge =

Battle of the First English Civil War

- Part of the First English Civil War
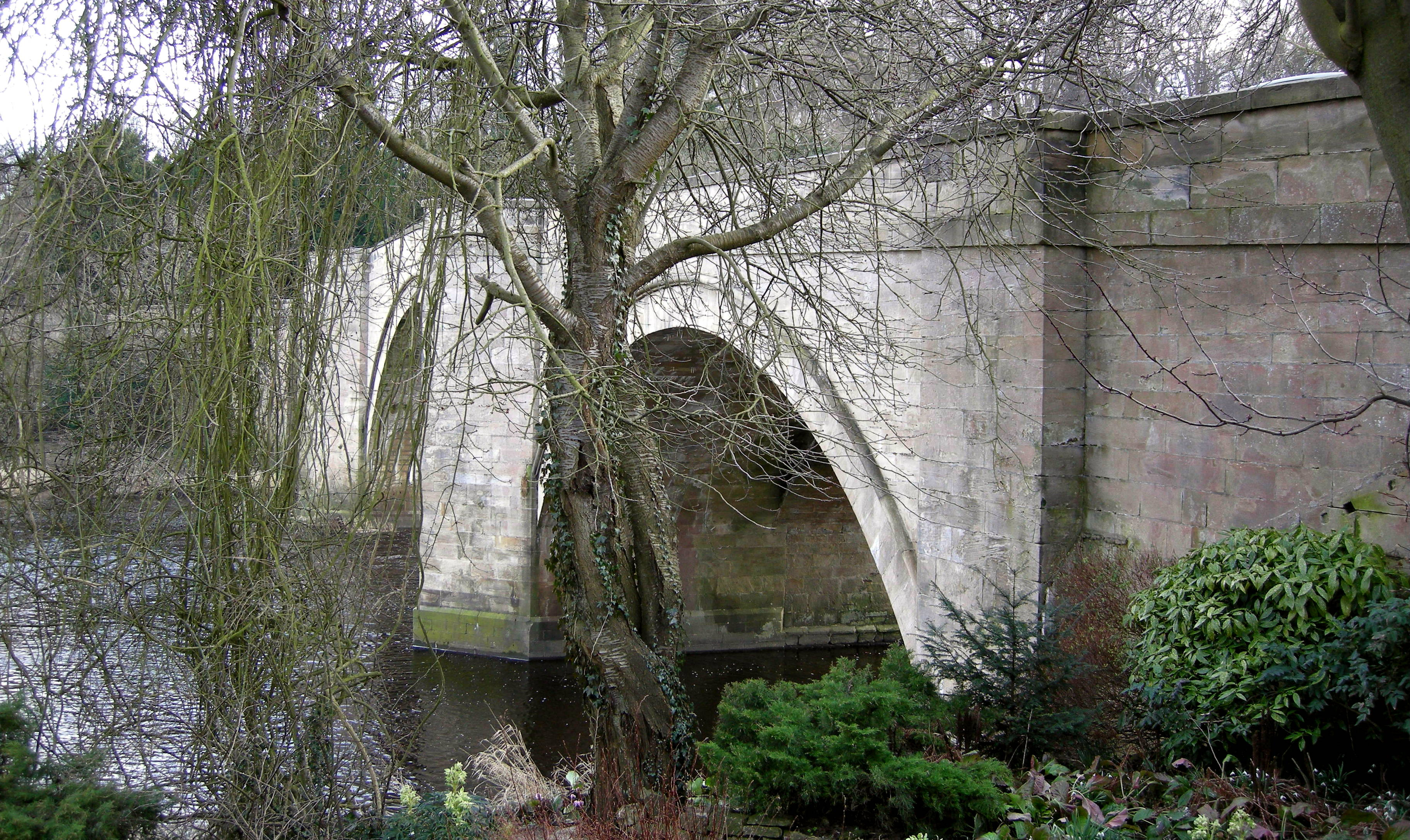
- The 16th-century bridge over the Tees at Piercebridge
Date	1 December 1642
Location	Piercebridge, County Durham 54.53480°N 1.67583°W
Result	Royalist victory

Belligerents
Royalists	Parliamentarians

Commanders and leaders
Earl of Newcastle; Sir Thomas Howard; Sir William Lambton	Captain John Hotham
- Piercebridge within County Durham

The battle of Piercebridge was fought on 1 December 1642 in County Durham, England, during the First English Civil War. The Earl of Newcastle was advancing with an army of 6,000 from Newcastle upon Tyne to York to reinforce the local Royalists. Aware of his approach, the Parliamentarians defended the main crossing over the River Tees, at Piercebridge. Under the command of Captain John Hotham, around 580 troops had barricaded the bridge.

Newcastle sent an advance guard under the command of Sir Thomas Howard to take the crossing. The Royalists placed their ten artillery pieces on a hill to the north east of the bridge, allowing them to soften up the Parliamentarian defences. Howard, who was killed during the engagement, led his dragoons in an assault on the bridge, and after three hours of heavy fighting, Hotham and his men retreated, allowing the Royalists to continue on to York. The introduction of Newcastle's army into Yorkshire gave the Royalists a numerical advantage in the county, and led the Parliamentarians to rely on Fabian tactics for the next eighteen months.

== Background ==
In December 1642, the First English Civil War was in its fourth month since Charles I had raised the Royal Standard in Nottingham and declared the Earl of Essex, and by extension Parliament, traitors. That action had been the culmination of religious, fiscal and legislative tensions going back over fifty years.

=== State of the war in North East England ===
Even before the formal start of the war, Yorkshire was a key area in the conflict. After Charles attempted to arrest five members of parliament in January 1642, members of the gentry started openly taking sides and preparing for war. Sir John Hotham seized Hull for Parliament the same month, and after fleeing London, the King established himself at York in March. The King twice attempted to take Hull in 1642 without success, and subsequently returned south to Nottingham. The Earl of Cumberland assumed command of the King's forces in Yorkshire. The Parliamentarians did not have a unified command: Ferdinando Fairfax, Lord Fairfax commanded their forces in the West Riding; Sir John Hotham held most of the East Riding; and Sir Hugh Cholmeley had a garrison in Scarborough, in the North Riding.

In the immediate aftermath of the King's departure in August, several of the gentry sought to dampen the escalation towards war within the county, even while continuing to consolidate their power; raising troops and establishing garrisons. Lord Fairfax arranged a meeting with some of the local Royalists which was held on 29 September, and they signed a Treaty of Neutrality. The treaty, which it was hoped could be used as a model for the whole country to adopt, suspended both the Militia Ordinance and the commissions of array, the methods of recruitment being used to raise forces, and disbanded the forces already raised within the county. It also called for all of Yorkshire to unite to repel any external force which entered the county. Although it was signed by twelve prominent leaders, neither the Hothams (Sir John Hotham and his son, Captain John Hotham) nor Cumberland were signatories, which the modern historian Stanley D. M. Carpenter cites as "ensuring its ultimate failure". Parliament rejected the treaty, while the Hothams rebelled against it, and attacked Selby and Cawood Castle in early October. By the middle of the month, Lord Fairfax renounced the treaty and resumed military operations.

North of Yorkshire, William Cavendish, Earl of Newcastle, had been appointed as Royalist commander of Cumberland, Durham, Northumberland and Westmorland. Unlike the disputed state of Yorkshire, Newcastle was able to establish control of the four counties for the Royalists by the middle of October. In February, Charles's wife Henrietta Maria (formally known as Queen Mary) had travelled to the continent to obtain a supply of weapons, and alongside his regional command, Newcastle had also been tasked with securing North Sea ports to facilitate her return. He was also responsible for protecting her once she arrived.

== Prelude ==
Despite peace overtures being made by Fairfax, by late September several of the leading Yorkshire Royalists felt threatened by the Parliamentarian forces which surrounded York on three sides, and fearing that they would not be able to repel an attack, they requested that Newcastle come to their assistance. Newcastle agreed, with several conditions: namely that his troops in Yorkshire would be paid, provisioned and billeted at the cost of the Yorkshire Royalists, and that when Henrietta Maria returned, he could withdraw from Yorkshire to protect her without breaching the agreement. Once the deal was agreed, Newcastle did not march south until he had finished training his troops. In late November, Newcastle began his advance from Newcastle upon Tyne towards Yorkshire, with an army of around 6,000 men; this comprised 4,000 infantry, 2,000 cavalry and dragoons, and ten artillery pieces.

Fairfax, who had been named in September as the commander of Parliament's forces in Yorkshire, was aware of the build-up of troops to the north, and on 9 November he sent Captain John Hotham into the North Riding to rally the local troops against Newcastle. Hotham forced the Royalists in the area to withdraw north, and camped at Piercebridge on 23 November. As the main crossing point on the River Tees, on the border between County Durham and Yorkshire, Newcastle would have to use the bridge on his march south, especially as winter made the river itself impassable. To defend against Newcastle's advance, Hotham placed a force of around 580 men (400 infantry and 180 cavalry) with two cannons on the southern side of the bridge.

== Opposing forces ==
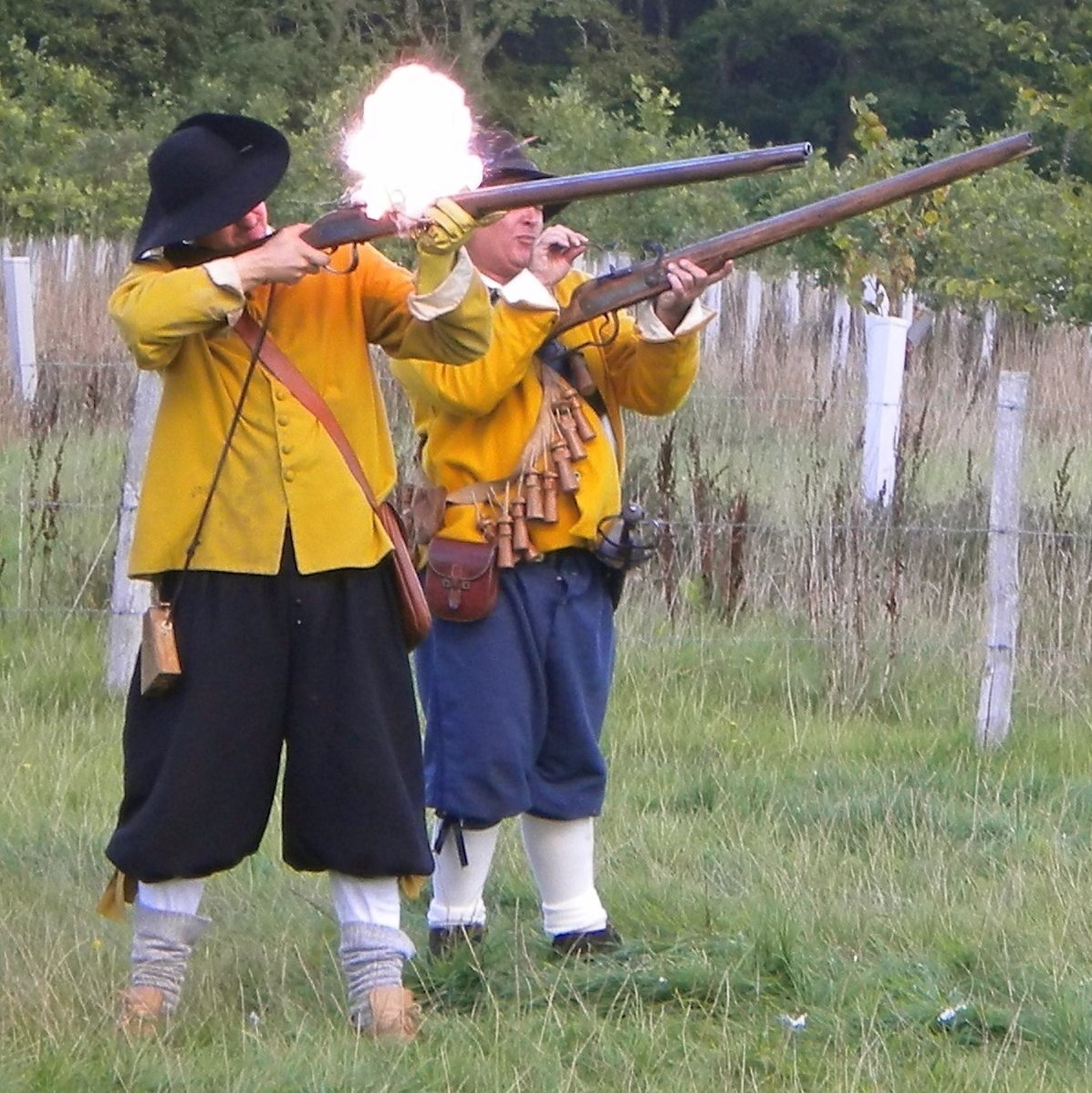
Reenactors in period outfits demonstrating the firing of a matchlock muske].

An infantry regiment, which could vary greatly in size, consisted of both musketeers and pikemen. Musketeers were armed with muskets, which at this early stage of the war typically used a matchlock firing mechanism. They were accurate to a range of around 150 yards (140 m), and took about a minute to reload. Most muskets had a steel-lined butt so that they could be used as a club in close-combat. Pikemen were equipped with pikes: long wooden shafts tipped with steel points, which were typically 15–18 feet (4.6–5.5 m) in length. By the time of the English Civil War, pikemen were predominantly defensive units to protect the musketeers from cavalry attacks. Dragoons were mounted infantry, armed with muskets, who were typically used as skirmishers or as part of advanced guards due to their mobility. They rode into battle, but dismounted to fight. The cavalry remained mounted to fight, generally on larger horses than dragoons. Most were harquebusiers, who were armoured with a helmet and plate armour on their torso, and carried a sword, two pistols and a carbine.

At Piercebridge, Hotham commanded three troops of cavalry; his own, Wray's and Hatcher's, each consisting of 60 men. The infantry was made up of Sir Matthew Boynton's regiment, possibly split into four companies. Newcastle sent his vanguard into Piercebridge; Sir William Lambton's Regiment of Foot and Sir Thomas Howard's Regiment of Dragoons. It is unknown how many men this constituted; notionally, an infantry regiment could include up to 1,200 men, but this varied depending upon both the whim of the commanding officer, and how successful their recruitment had been. As a result, infantry regiments could include as few as 500 men. Dragoon regiments similarly varied, and could include as many as 1,000 men. The modern historian P. R. Newman is not confident that enough historical evidence exists to know whether Howard's dragoons formed a regiment: he settles on describing them as a "force".

== Battle ==
On 1 December, Newcastle ordered the vanguard into Piercebridge under the command of Howard. The Royalists adopted tactics used by the Scottish Covenanters during the Battle of Newburn near Newcastle upon Tyne two years earlier, and placed their ten artillery pieces on Carlbury Hill, to the north east of the bridge, from where they could weaken the enemy defences around the bridge. Howard's dragoons led the assault through the village, which lay to the north of the bridge. According to the Battlefields Trust, it is likely that Hotham had placed some of his men in the village, hidden in the buildings and gardens, which the dragoons drove back. The bridge itself was barricaded, and covered by the Parliamentarian's two light artillery pieces, which were either placed on the bridge, or further south on higher ground near the village of Cliffe.

Behind the dragoons, Lambton's infantry followed. A combined assault of dragoons, infantry and artillery continued for several hours, during which Howard was killed. Despite claiming to suffer only minimal casualties, the Parliamentarians retreated; according to the Battlefields Trust, concentrations of lead shot found suggest that they continued to lay down covering fire as they did so.

== Aftermath ==
The Parliamentarians retreated south through Yorkshire towards Knaresborough. With his path clear, Newcastle continued into York, where he arrived on 4 December. His advance had split the Parliamentarian forces, which maintained strongholds in Hull in the East Riding, and in the West Riding towns. He initially pressed his advantage by defeating Fairfax at the Battle of Tadcaster on 6 December, and capturing both Leeds and Pontefract Castle, but then his campaign was checked. The Royalists were rebuffed from Bradford, where the general population rose against them, and Newcastle soon stopped campaigning and settled down for the winter.

In the short-term, the balance of power in the county had shifted towards the Royalists; Newcastle had the numerical advantage, which forced Fairfax to adopt a Fabian strategy; avoiding large pitched battles and holding too much land, and instead wearing the Royalists down with a series of smaller assaults. Over the longer-term, the Parliamentarian tactics, which Carpenter attributed to Fairfax's "far keener strategic vision", led to their decisive victory over the Royalists at the Battle of Marston Moor in 1644.

The 16th-century bridge remains in place, although it was widened in the 18th century to allow more traffic to cross. The Battlefields Trust suggest that the village of Piercebridge is probably not much larger than it was at the time of the battle, and that earthworks located above Cliffe might be the remains of the Parliamentarian's artillery emplacement.

== Bibliography ==
- Barratt, John (2004). Cavalier Generals: King Charles I and His Commanders in the English Civil War 1642–46. Barnsley: Pen & Sword Military. ISBN 1-84415-128-X.
- Bennett, Martyn (2005). The Civil Wars Experienced: Britain and Ireland, 1638–1661. London: Routledge. ISBN 0-203-98180-4.
- Bleiberg, Edward; Soergel, Philip, eds. (2005). "The English Civil Wars". Arts and Humanities Through the Eras. Vol. 5: The Age of the Baroque and Enlightenment 1600–1800. Detroit: Gale. pp. 344–348. ISBN 978-0-787-65697-3.
- Carpenter, Stanley D. M. (2005). Military Leadership in the British Civil Wars, 1642–1651. London & New York: Frank Cass. ISBN 0-714-65544-9.
- Cooke, David (2004). The Civil War in Yorkshire: Fairfax Versus Newcastle. Barnsley: Pen & Sword Military. ISBN 1-84415-076-3.
- Cooke, David (2006). Battlefield Yorkshire: From the Romans to the English Civil Wars. Barnsley: Pen & Sword Military. ISBN 1-84415-424-6.
- Daniels, Robin; Philo, Phil (2018). The First Great Civil War in the Tees Valley 1642–1646 (PDF). The Authors & Heritage Lottery Fund. Archived from the original (PDF) on 13 January 2021.
- Gaunt, Peter (2014). The English Civil War: A Military History. London: I. B. Taurus. ISBN 978-1-8488-5881-7.
- Hopper, Andrew (2007). Black Tom: Sir Thomas Fairfax and the English Revolution. Manchester and New York: Manchester University Press. ISBN 978-0-7190-7108-9.
- Hopper, Andrew (2008) [2004]. "Fairfax, Ferdinando, second Lord Fairfax of Cameron". Oxford Dictionary of National Biography (online ed.). Oxford University Press. doi:10.1093/ref:odnb/9081. (Subscription, Wikipedia Library access or UK public library membership required.)
- Hopper, Andrew (2011). "The Papers of the Hothams, Governors of Hull During the Civil War: Introduction". Camden. Fifth Series. 39. London: Royal Historical Society. doi:10.1017/S0960116311000029.
- Hulse, Lynn (2011) [2004]. "Cavendish, William, first duke of Newcastle upon Tyne". Oxford Dictionary of National Biography (online ed.). Oxford University Press. doi:10.1093/ref:odnb/4946. (Subscription, Wikipedia Library access or UK public library membership required.)
- Newman, P. R. (1978). "The Royalist Army in Northern England: 1642–45" (PDF). (Doctoral Thesis). York: Department of History, University of York.
- Roberts, Keith (1989). Soldiers of the English Civil War (1): Infantry. Oxford: Osprey. ISBN 0-85045-903-6.
- Royle, Trevor (2005) [2004]. Civil War: The Wars of the Three Kingdoms, 1638–1660. London: Abacus. ISBN 0-349-11564-8.
- Tincey, John (1990). Soldiers of the English Civil War (2): Cavalry. Oxford: Osprey. ISBN 0-85045-940-0.
- Wanklyn, Malcolm; Jones, Frank (2014) [2005]. A Military History of the English Civil War: 1642–1649. Abingdon: Routledge. ISBN 978-0-582-77281-6.
- "Battle of Piercebridge, 1st December 1642". UK Battlefields Resource Centre. The Battlefields Trust.
