= John Lambert (general) =

English army officer and politician (1619–1683)

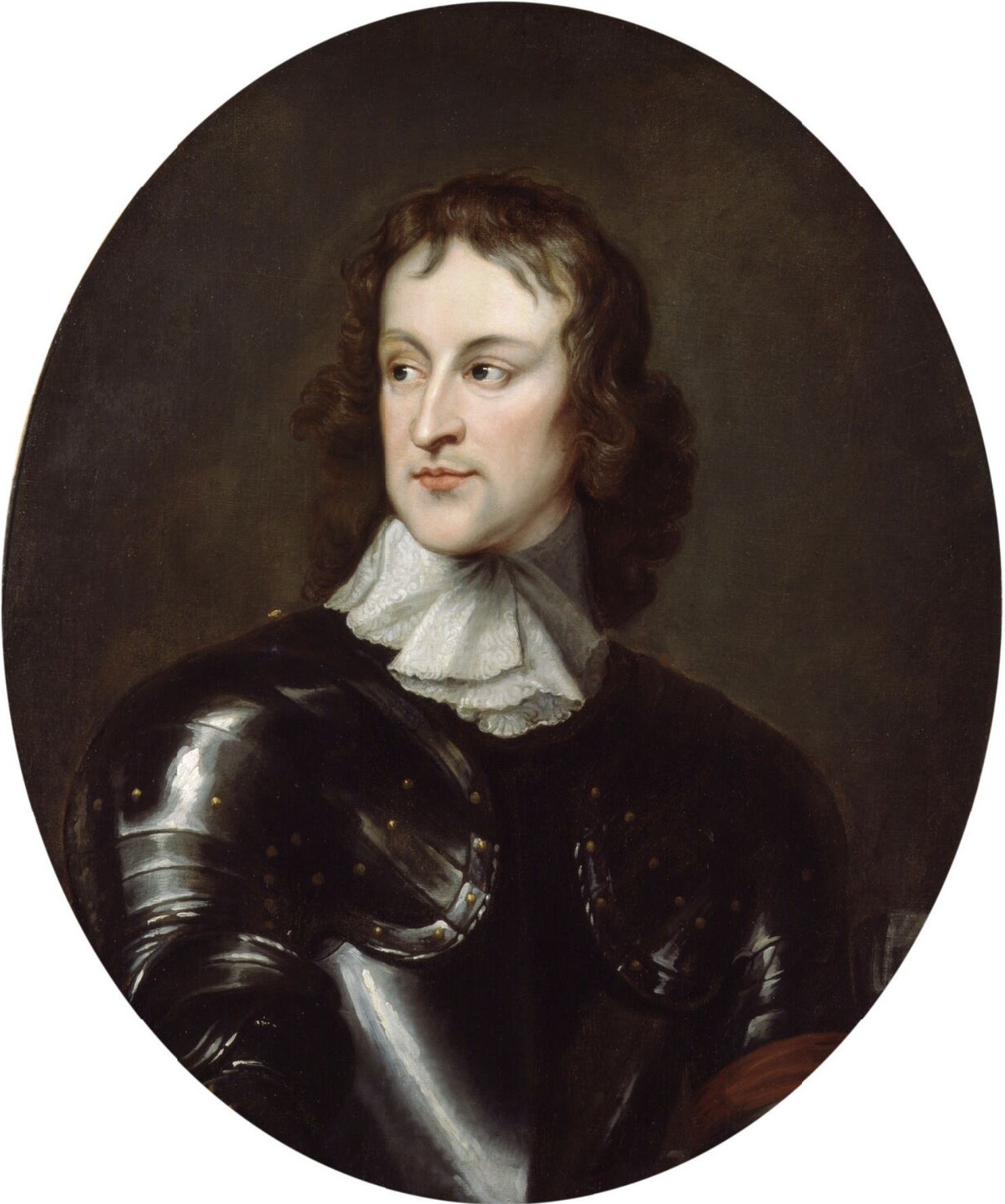
- Portrait by Robert Walker, c. 1650

Committee of Safety
- In office May 1659 – October 1659

Member of Parliament for Pontefract
- In office January 1659 – April 1659

Rule of the Major Generals, Northern Region
- In office October 1655 – January 1657

Nominated to Barebone's Parliament
- In office July 1653 – December 1653

Lord President, Council of State
- In office April 1653 – May 1653

Personal details
- Born: 7 September 1619 (baptised) Calton Hall, near Kirkby Malham, Yorkshire, England
- Died: 1 March 1684 (aged 64) Drake's Island, Plymouth, England
- Resting place: St Andrew's Church, Plymouth
- Party: Parliamentarian
- Spouse: Frances Lister (1622–1676)
- Children: Thomas, John and Mary
- Education: Trinity College, Cambridge
- Occupation: Soldier and politician

Military service
- Allegiance: Kingdom of England; Commonwealth of England
- Rank: Major general
- Battles/wars: Wars of the Three Kingdoms; Tadcaster; Selby; Nantwich; Marston Moor; Siege of Pontefract; Siege of Dartmouth; Siege of Oxford; Preston; Dunbar; Inverkeithing; Worcester; Booth's Uprising

Major-General John Lambert (Note: Also spelled Lambart) (7 September 1619 – 1 March 1684) was an English army officer and politician. Widely regarded as one of the most talented commanders of the era, he fought on the Parliamentarian side throughout the Wars of the Three Kingdoms, and was largely responsible for the English victory in the Anglo-Scottish war of 1650–1652.

Although Lambert was involved in the discussions between the New Model Army and Parliament during 1647, his first formal involvement in civilian politics was in 1653, when he became a member of the English Council of State. In December 1653, he helped prepare the "Instrument of Government", which became the constitutional framework for the Protectorate. He later fell out with Oliver Cromwell, largely because he opposed converting Cromwell's role as Lord Protector into a kingship.

Lambert lost his offices in 1657 after refusing to swear an oath of loyalty to Cromwell, but in early 1659, following Cromwell's death in September 1658, he re-entered politics as Member of Parliament for Pontefract. When Richard Cromwell, his late father's successor, resigned in May, Lambert became a member of the Committee of Safety and successfully suppressed the Royalist Booth's Uprising. He was then sent to deal with George Monck, commander of the army in Scotland, but Lambert's army disintegrated and he was imprisoned in the Tower of London on 3 March 1660.

Lambert escaped a month later, on 9 April, and made one final attempt to resist the Stuart Restoration before being recaptured on 24 April. Despite his prominent role in the Protectorate, he had not participated in the Trial of Charles I and had many close connections with senior Royalists. Although he was initially sentenced to death, that was commuted to life imprisonment; he spent the remaining 24 years of his life under house arrest, first on Guernsey, then on Drake's Island near Plymouth, where he died on 1 March 1684.

== Personal details ==
John Lambert was born at Calton Hall, near Kirkby Malham in Yorkshire, son of Josias Lambert (1554–1632) and his third wife, Anne Pigott (ca 1605–1643). He had two half-sisters from his father's previous marriages, Cassandra and Jane.

A well-established member of the minor Yorkshire gentry, by the late 1620s Josias was in serious financial difficulties and died almost bankrupt. As a minor, John Lambert became the ward of Sir William Lister, a long-standing family friend, who appears to have paid for his education at Trinity College, Cambridge.

In 1639 he married Frances Lister (1622–1676), Sir William's younger daughter; they had three children who survived into adulthood, Thomas (1639–1694), John (1639–1701) and Mary (1642–1675).

== Career ==
=== First English Civil War ===
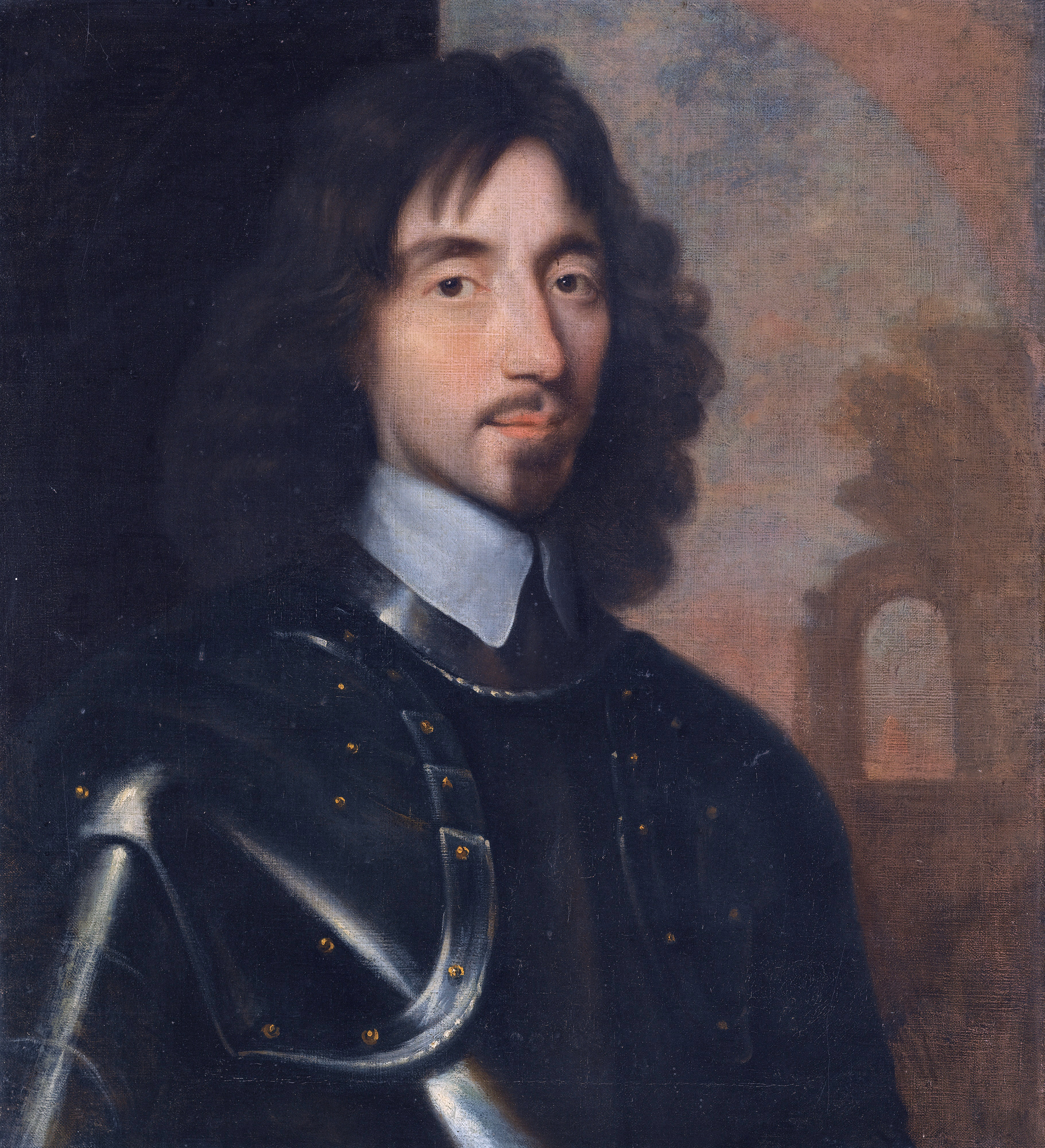
Thomas Fairfax; Lambert's mentor in the 1640s and commander of the New Model Army, he resigned in protest at the execution of Charles I in January 1649

Pre-Civil War Yorkshire was characterised by close links among the local gentry, which often overrode political or religious differences. Although Lambert and the Listers followed Lord Fairfax in supporting Parliament, they were related by marriage and blood to Royalists like Sir Henry Slingsby and John Belasyse. Even during the 1650s, Lambert remained on good terms with Belasyse, despite the latter being a Catholic and leader of the secret Royalist association known as the Sealed Knot.

When the First English Civil War began in August 1642, Lambert joined the Parliamentarian army of the Northern Association, commanded by the elder Fairfax. He fought at Tadcaster in December 1642, where his brother-in-law William Lister was killed; Lambert quickly established a reputation as a confident and aggressive soldier. He played a prominent role in the defence of Hull and participated in Parliamentarian victories at Nantwich and Selby in early 1644. At Marston Moor, fought just outside York on 2 July, he and Thomas Fairfax led the Parliamentarian right, which was routed by Lord Goring. Accompanied only by a few troops, the two men fought their way across the battlefield to join Oliver Cromwell on the left and help secure victory.

In January 1645, Thomas Fairfax was appointed commander of the New Model Army and Lambert promoted Commissary General of the Northern Association, effectively acting as his deputy. During the siege of Pontefract Castle, one of the few Royalist positions left in the north, he was wounded and defeated on 1 March by a relief force led by Marmaduke Langdale. Shortly after this, Fairfax was replaced as commander in the north by the Presbyterian mercenary Sydnam Poyntz. Lambert transferred to the New Model, although shortage of troops meant he remained in the north until just after Naseby in June 1645, when he served in Fairfax's western campaign. He supervised the capture of Dartmouth in January 1646 and was present at the sieges of Truro in March, Exeter in April and finally Oxford in June, which ended the First Civil War. In a sign of his growing stature within the New Model, Lambert acted as a commissioner for each surrender, in conjunction with Henry Ireton.

=== Second English Civil War ===
Victory exposed long-standing divisions between mostly Presbyterian moderates led by Denzil Holles who dominated Parliament, and radicals within the New Model Army, focused around Cromwell. Originating in differences over the political settlement with Charles I, it was exacerbated by financial issues and by March 1647, the New Model Army was owed more than £3 million in unpaid wages. Parliament ordered it to Ireland, stating only those who agreed would be paid; when their representatives demanded full payment for all in advance, it was disbanded, but the army refused to comply.

Lambert key locations, 1642 to 1651

Concerned by the influence of radicals such as the Levellers within the New Model Army, the Army Council was established to ensure a united front against Holles and his supporters. Working with Ireton, Lambert helped draw up the army's terms for a peace settlement with the king, although the extent of his involvement has been challenged by some historians. After these were rejected by Charles, the Holles faction demanded he be invited to London for further talks. Fearing Charles was going to be restored without significant concessions, the Army Council took control of the city on 7 August and in October expelled their leading opponents from Parliament, the so-called Eleven Members.

When the Northern Association army mutinied in early July 1647, Lambert was reinstated as commander and quickly succeeded in restoring discipline. This was essential because a similar political struggle was taking place in Scotland between the Kirk Party and the Engagers, who gained control of government in April 1648. Backed by an alliance of English/Welsh Royalists and former Parliamentarian moderates, they agreed to restore Charles to the English throne and initiated the Second English Civil War in April 1648.

Most of the New Model Army was with Fairfax, who was suppressing revolts in Essex and Kent, and Cromwell in South Wales, leaving Lambert facing a precarious situation in the north. The garrisons of Pontefract and Scarborough changed sides, while Royalists led by Sir Marmaduke Langdale captured Berwick and Carlisle. Although he could not prevent the Engagers under Hamilton crossing the border in July, Lambert fought a series of skilful delaying actions until Cromwell was able to join him. The Royalist/Engager army was destroyed after three days of fighting at Preston in August, while Lambert captured Hamilton at Uttoxeter on 25 August.

Although the war was largely over, the Kirk Party asked for support and Lambert entered Edinburgh in September, before returning to Yorkshire. He supported the 'Remonstrance of the Army' issued in November, listing their grievances against Charles and Parliament, and named as one of the judges for the trial of Charles I. However, until March 1649 he was absent at the siege of Pontefract and thus avoided involvement in his execution in January, although he did not oppose it.

=== The Commonwealth ===
When Cromwell was appointed to the command of the war in Scotland (July 1650), Lambert went with him as major-general and second in command. He was wounded at Musselburgh, but returned to the front in time to take a conspicuous share in the victory of Dunbar. He himself repulsed a surprise attack by the Covenanters at the Battle of Hamilton on 1 December 1650. In July 1651 he was sent into Fife to get in the rear and flank of the Scottish army near Falkirk, and force them to decisive action by cutting off their supplies. This mission, in the course of which Lambert won an important victory at Inverkeithing, was so successful that Charles II, as Lambert had foreseen, made for England. Lambert's part in the general plan of the resulting Worcester campaign was carried out brilliantly (including his capture of Upton-Upon-Severn), and in the crowning victory of Worcester he commanded the right wing of the English army, and had his horse shot under him. Parliament granted him lands in Scotland worth £1000 per annum.

In October 1651 Lambert was made a commissioner under the Tender of Union to settle the affairs of Scotland, and on the death of Ireton he was appointed lord deputy of Ireland (January 1652). He made extensive preparations; parliament, however, reconstituted the Irish administration and Lambert refused to accept office on the new terms. He then began to oppose the Rump Parliament. In the Council of Officers he headed the party desiring representative government, as opposed to Harrison who favoured an oligarchy of "God-fearing" men, but both hated the Rump of the Long Parliament, and joined in urging Cromwell to dissolve it by force.

At the same time Lambert was consulted by the parliamentary leaders as to the possibility of dismissing Cromwell from his command, and on 15 March 1653 Cromwell refused to see him, speaking of him contemptuously as "bottomless Lambert". On 20 April 1653, however, Lambert accompanied Cromwell when he dismissed the Council of State, on the same day as the forcible expulsion of the parliament.

Lambert now favoured the formation of a small executive council, to be followed by an elective parliament whose powers should be limited by a written instrument of government. As the ruling spirit in the Council of State, and the idol of the army, he was seen as a possible rival of Cromwell for the chief executive power, while the royalists for a short time had hopes of his support. He was invited, with Cromwell, Harrison and John Desborough, to sit in the nominated "Barebones Parliament" of 1653; and when the unpopularity of that assembly increased, Cromwell drew nearer to Lambert. In November 1653 Lambert presided over a meeting of officers, when the question of constitutional settlement was discussed, and a proposal made for the forcible expulsion of the nominated parliament. On 12 December 1653, the parliament resigned its powers into Cromwell's hands, and on 13 December Lambert obtained the consent of the officers to the Instrument of Government, in the framing of which he had taken a lead. He was one of the seven officers nominated to seats in the council created by the Instrument.

In the foreign policy of the Protectorate Lambert called for alliance with Spain and war with France in 1653, and he firmly withstood Cromwell's Western Design for an expedition to the West Indies to seize Spanish territory.

In the debates in parliament on the Instrument of Government in 1654 Lambert proposed that the office of Lord Protector should be made hereditary, but was defeated by a majority, which included members of Cromwell's family. In the parliament of this year, and again in 1656, Lord Lambert, as he was now styled, sat as member for the West Riding. He was one of the major-generals appointed in August 1655 to command the militia in the ten districts into which it was proposed to divide England, and who were to be responsible for the maintenance of order and the administration of the law in their several districts.

Lambert took a prominent part in the Committee of Council, which drew up instructions to the administrative major-generals. He was the organiser of the system of police which these officers were to control. Samuel Gardiner conjectures that it was through divergence of opinion between the Protector and Lambert in connection with these "instructions" that the estrangement between the two men began. At all events, although Lambert had himself at an earlier date requested Cromwell to take the royal dignity, when the proposal to declare Oliver king was started in parliament (February 1657) he immediately opposed it.

A hundred officers headed by Charles Fleetwood and Lambert waited on the Protector, and begged him to put a stop to the proceedings. Lambert was not convinced by Cromwell's arguments, and their complete estrangement, personal as well as political, followed. On his refusal to take the oath of allegiance to the protector, Lambert was deprived of his commissions, receiving instead a pension of £2000 a year. He retired from public life to Wimbledon; but shortly before his own death Cromwell sought a reconciliation, and Lambert and his wife visited Cromwell at Whitehall.

When Richard Cromwell was proclaimed Protector (3 September 1658), his chief difficulty lay with the army, over which he exercised no effective control. Lambert, though holding no military commission, was the most popular of the old Cromwellian generals with the rank and file of the army, and it was very generally believed that he would install himself in Oliver Cromwell's seat of power. Richard Cromwell's adherents tried to conciliate him, and the royalist leaders made overtures to him, even proposing that Charles II should marry Lambert's daughter. Lambert at first gave a lukewarm support to Richard Cromwell, and took no part in the intrigues of the officers at Fleetwood's residence, Wallingford House. He was a member of the Third Protectorate Parliament which met in January 1659, and when it was dissolved in April under compulsion of Fleetwood and Desborough, he was restored to his commands. He headed the deputation to Lenthall in May 1659 inviting the return of the Rump Parliament, which led to the tame retirement of Richard Cromwell; and he was appointed a member of the Committee of Safety and of the Council of State.

When the parliament, in an attempt to control the power of the army, withheld from Fleetwood the right of nominating officers, Lambert was named one of a council of seven charged with this duty. The parliament's evident distrust of the soldiers caused much discontent in the army. While the absence of authority encouraged the royalists to make overt attempts to restore Charles II, the most serious of which, under Sir George Booth and the earl of Derby, was crushed by Lambert near Chester on 19 August 1659. He promoted a petition from his army that Fleetwood might be made lord-general and himself major-general. The republican party in the House took offence. The Commons (12 October 1659) cashiered Lambert and other officers, and retained Fleetwood as chief of a military council under the authority of the speaker. On the next day Lambert caused the doors of the House to be shut and the members kept out. On 26 October a new Committee of Safety was appointed, of which he was a member. He was also appointed major-general of all the forces in England and Scotland, Fleetwood being general.

Lambert was now sent with a large force to meet George Monck, who was in command of the English forces in Scotland, and either negotiate with him or force him to terms. Monck, however, marched southward. Lambert's army began to melt away over various issues, including lack of pay and lack of enthusiasm for the military regime. He was kept in suspense by Monck till his whole army deserted and he returned to London almost alone. Monck marched to London unopposed. The excluded Presbyterian members were recalled. Lambert was sent to the Tower (3 March 1660), from which he escaped a month later. He descended a silk rope and aided by six men was taken away by barge. He tried to rekindle the civil war in favour of the Commonwealth by issuing a proclamation calling on all supporters of the "Good Old Cause" to rally on the battlefield of Edgehill. But he was recaptured on 22 April at Daventry by Colonel Richard Ingoldsby, a regicide who hoped to win a pardon by handing Lambert over to the new regime. He was kept imprisoned in the Tower of London and then transferred to Castle Cornet on the island Guernsey.

=== Restoration ===
On the Restoration Lambert was exempted from prosecution by an address of both Houses of the Convention Parliament to the king, but the Cavalier Parliament in 1662 charged him with high treason. In April 1662 General Lambert was, with Sir Henry Vane, brought to England and tried in June 1662. On 25 July a warrant was issued to Lord Hatton, the governor of Guernsey, to take into his custody "the person of John Lambert, commonly called Colonel Lambert, and keep him a close prisoner as a condemned traitor until further orders". On 18 November following, directions were given from the king to Lord Hatton to "give such liberty and indulgence to Colonel John Lambert within the precincts of the island as will consist with the security of his person".

== Later life ==
In 1662 Lambert was imprisoned in Guernsey. In 1667 he was transferred to Drake's Island in Plymouth Sound, at the entrance to the Hamoaze, and he died there during the severe winter of 1683–84. The site of his grave is now lost but he was laid to rest at St Andrews Church in Plymouth on 28 March 1684.

== Legacy ==
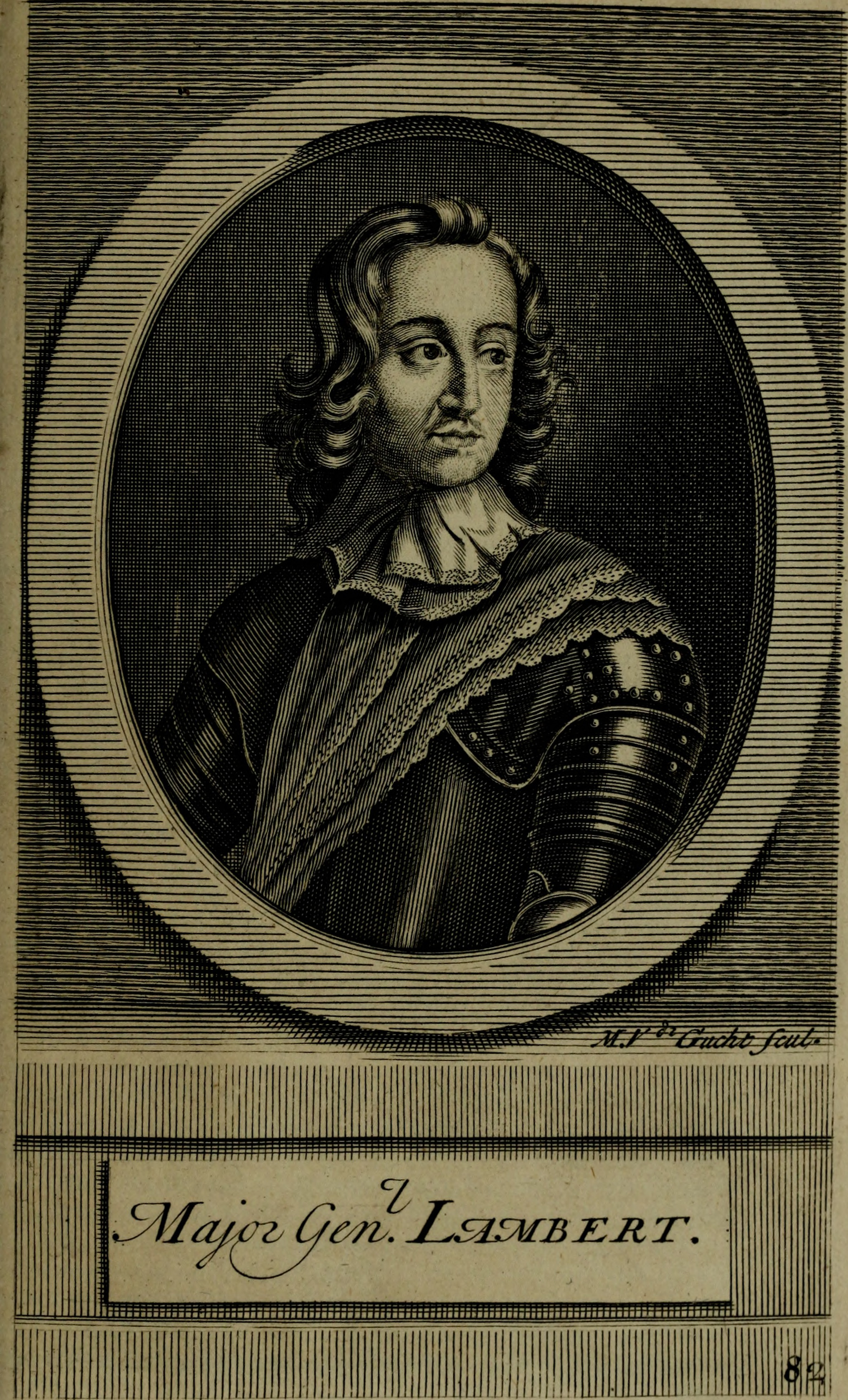
Engraving of Lambert by Michael Vandergucht, 1717

He was the author of the Instrument of Government, the first written constitution in the world codifying sovereign powers. The Instrument of Government was replaced in May 1657 by England's second, last, and extinct codified constitution, the Humble Petition and Advice.

It has been said that Lambert's nature had more in common with the royalist than with the puritan spirit. Vain and ambitious, he believed that Cromwell could not stand without him; and when Cromwell was dead, he imagined himself entitled to succeed him. As a soldier he was far more than a fighting general and possessed many of the qualities of a great general. He was an able writer and speaker, and an accomplished negotiator and took pleasure in quiet and domestic pursuits. He learnt his love of gardening from Lord Fairfax, who was also his master in the art of war. He painted flowers, besides cultivating them, and was accused by Lucy Hutchinson of "dressing his flowers in his garden and working at the needle with his wife and his maids".

== Sources ==
- Adamson, JSA (1987). "The English Nobility and the Projected Settlement of 1647". The Historical Journal. 30 (3): 567–602. doi:10.1017/S0018246X00020896. JSTOR 2639160. S2CID 154769885.
- Barratt, John (1975). "A Royalist Account of the Relief of Pontefract, 1st March 1645". Society for Army Historical Research. 53 (215): 159–169. JSTOR 44225367.
- Farr, D. N. (2011). "Poyntz [Poynts], Sydenham [Sednham])". Oxford Dictionary of National Biography (online ed.). Oxford University Press. doi:10.1093/ref:odnb/22695. (Subscription, Wikipedia Library access or UK public library membership required.)
- Farr, D. N. (2004). "Lambert, John (bap. 1619, d. 1684)". Oxford Dictionary of National Biography (online ed.). Oxford University Press. doi:10.1093/ref:odnb/15939. (Subscription, Wikipedia Library access or UK public library membership required.)
- Farr, David (2003). John Lambert, Parliamentary Soldier and Cromwellian Major-General, 1619–1684. Boydell Press. ISBN 978-1843830047.
- Firth, Charles Harding (1893). "Lambert, John (1619–1683)" . In Lee, Sidney (ed.). Dictionary of National Biography. Vol. 33. London: Smith, Elder & Co. pp. 11–18.
- Grayling, A.C. (2017). Democracy and its crisis. Oneworld Publications. ISBN 978-1-78607-289-4.
- Greaves, Richard L. (1986). Deliver us from evil: the radical underground in Britain, 1660–1663. Oxford University Press US. ISBN 0-19-503985-8.
- Hill, PR; Watkinson, JM (2012). Cromwell Hath the Honour, But...: Major-General Lambert's Campaigns in the North 1648. Frontline Books. ISBN 978-1848326545.
- Rees, John (2016). The Leveller Revolution. Verso. ISBN 978-1-78478-390-7.
- Royle, Trevor (2006) [2004]. Civil War: The Wars of the Three Kingdoms 1638–1660. Abacus. ISBN 978-0-349-11564-1.

Attribution
