= James Forster =

James Forster may refer to:

- James William Forster (1784–1861), Archdeacon of Aghadoe
- James Forster (poison pen letter writer) (1933–2017), English academic and criminal
