= Edward Wooler =

Edward Wooler FSA (28 October 1851 – 7 July 1927) was a solicitor, author, councillor, alderman and antiquarian from Darlington.

== Early life ==
Wooler was born on 28 October 1851 in Darlington. He was the eldest son of solicitor Octavius Borrodaile Wooler. His childhood home was number 6 Harewood Hill, Darlington and he was educated at St. Peter's School in York.

== Career ==
Wooler practiced as a solicitor at the firm Wooler and Wooler, at 36 Priestgate, Darlington, from c.1879 until his death in 1927. He was elected as a Conservative councillor for Darlington's Central Ward on 6 January 1897 eventually succeeding at six successive elections. In 1915 he was elected an alderman for the town and held the position of Chairman of the Tramways Committee, the Education Committee and the Health Committee.

Wooler was a founding member of the Darlington Footpaths Preservation Society, formed on 10 May 1875 at a meeting in the Mechanics Institute to protest against wealthy landowners illegally fencing off public footpaths. In response to Edwin Lucas Pease blocking a footpath through his land at Bushel Hill in Mowden, Wooler led a group of ramblers from the Society in attacking the fencing and "vigorously set himself to work and cut down nine palings which crossed the path".

In 1894 Wooler purchased the Hat and Feathers pub and two adjacent cottages in Church Row with the specific intention of having them demolished to open out and improve the view of St Cuthbert's Church, Darlington. By the same year, 1894, Wooler also owned Bennet House in Horsemarket, Darlington and according to local legend had the west wall of Bennet House demolished and rebuilt six inches further in to widen Bull Wynd, the alley next to it, from 8 ft 6in to back to 9 ft which was its original width. Bennet House's Grade II listed status states that there was a 'right return to Bull Wynd rebuilt in modern brick' so this may be true.

== Antiquarian activities ==
Wooler was a Fellow of the Society of Antiquaries of London and also a member of the Society of Antiquaries of Newcastle upon Tyne for nearly 30 years. He had particular interest in the Stanwick Iron Age Fortifications in the North Riding of Yorkshire, a large fortification of the Brigantes, and also Piercebridge Roman Fort and led a number of educational visits to these sites.

== Personal life ==
In 1874 Wooler married Dorothy Hannah Heslop, the daughter of Darlington wine merchant Robert Heslop, at St Mary's Church, Scarborough. They had three sons. Wooler's private residence was 'Danesmoor', Carmel Road, Darlington, from before 1881 until his death in 1927. The building is now Grade II listed and is used as a nursery.

== Death ==
Wooler died on 7 July 1927 and left £57,750 in his will which is today equivalent to £2,644,106. In the October after his death there was a sale of his collection of historical deeds held at Danesmoor. These are now held by Durham University. He left a bequest of over 1,600 books on archaeology and local antiquities to the Yorkshire Philosophical Society and it has been claimed that his ghost haunts the library of the Yorkshire Museum in York.

== Publications ==
Wooler co-wrote, with Alfred Caine Boyde, the children's textbook Historic Darlington, published in 1913. Wooler also authored the book The Roman Fort at Piercebridge published in 1917. He wrote papers for the Proceedings of the Society of Antiquaries of Newcastle upon Tyne and the Yorkshire Archaeological Journal. The Crown Street Library in Darlington holds a number of Wooler's published articles and other documents in its local history section.
