= Piercebridge Roman Bridge =

Former bridge over the River Tees in Northern England

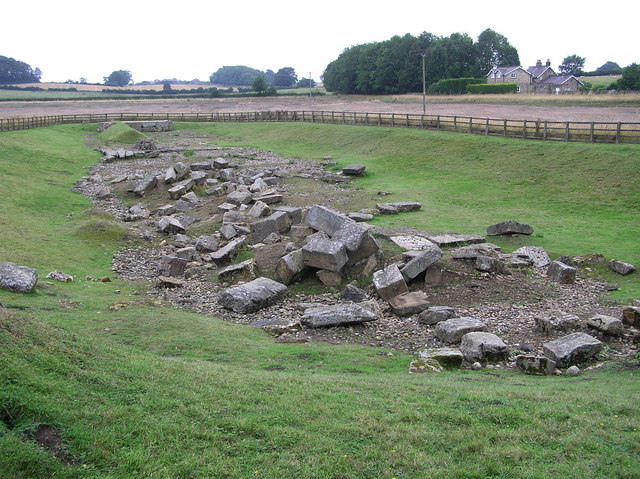
- Piercebridge Roman Bridge

- Location in North Yorkshire
- 54.536°N 1.671°W
- Location: Cliffe, North Yorkshire, England
- OS grid reference: NZ213156

Piercebridge Roman Bridge is the ruin of a Roman bridge over the River Tees, northern England. It is near the villages of Cliffe (North Yorkshire) and Piercebridge, County Durham.

The most recent excavations were by Channel 4's Time Team in 2009.

== History ==
The bridge carried the Roman road Dere Street across the river. Piercebridge Roman Fort guarded the bridge. The first bridge was built around 90 AD, but this may have been replaced by a second bridge after it was washed away.

Over the centuries since then, the Tees has narrowed and changed its course. As a result the remains lie in a field around 90 metres (300 ft) south of the current course of the river, and about 450 metres (1,480 ft) east of Piercebridge.

== Remains ==
What remains of the bridge are massive masonry blocks that formed at least five piers. The lower courses of one of the abutments still stand, partially complete, and it is possible to see the holes into which the wooden structure of the bridge would have fitted. All of the timber has disappeared in the nearly 16 centuries since the end of the Roman occupation. The remains were discovered in 1972 during gravel quarrying. The stone blocks are up to 1.5 metres (4 ft 11 in) long and the total bridge structure was 123 metres (404 ft) long. Artefacts from the excavation of the bridge and fort can be seen in the Bowes Museum in Barnard Castle.

== Alternative interpretation ==
Whilst the majority opinion among archaeologists is that the structure is a bridge, an alternative interpretation has been proposed by archaeologist Raymond Selkirk, who contends that the structure is a navigation dam with an overspill channel. From this, and other evidence he argues that the Romans made far greater use of river transport than is generally recognised. His views are set out in his books The Piercebridge Formula (1983), On the Trail of the Legions (1995) and Chester-le-Street & Its Place in History (2000).

== See also ==
- List of Roman bridges
- Roman architecture
- Roman engineering

Next crossing upstream	River Tees	Next crossing downstream
Piercebridge Bridge (260 yards (240 m) )	Piercebridge Roman Bridge; Grid reference NZ213156	
