= Listed buildings in Manfield =

Manfield is a civil parish in the county of North Yorkshire, England. It contains six listed buildings that are recorded in the National Heritage List for England. Of these, one is listed at Grade II*, the middle of the three grades, and the others are at Grade II, the lowest grade. The parish contains the village of Manfield and the surrounding countryside. The listed buildings consist of a church, a cross shaft and base in the churchyard, a farmhouse, a bridge and two houses.

== Key ==
Grade	Criteria
II*	Particularly important buildings of more than special interest
II	Buildings of national importance and special interest

== Buildings ==
Name and location	Photograph	Date	Notes	Grade
All Saints' Church; 54.51519°N 1.65758°W		12th century	The church has been altered and extended though the centuries, including a restoration in 1849–55. It is built in sandstone with stone slate roofs, and consists of a nave with a clerestory, north and south aisles, a south porch, a chancel with a north vestry, and a west tower. The tower has three stages, stepped diagonal buttresses, a chamfered plinth, a projecting stair turret, a string course, a west window, a clock face, two-light bell openings, and an embattled parapet.	II*
Cross shaft and base 54.51508°N 1.65774°W		Medieval	The cross shaft and base are in the churchyard of All Saints' Church, to the south of the church, and are in sandstone. The base has a square plan and a socket, and the shaft has a rectangular plan, and is about 500 millimetres (20 in) high.	II
Cliffe Bank Farmhouse; 54.52608°N 1.67174°W	—	Mid 18th century	The farmhouse is in sandstone with some cobbles, quoins, and a pantile roof with stone slates at the eaves, stone coping and shaped kneelers. There are two storeys, the main range has three bays, and to the left is a slightly recessed wing with two bays. In the centre of the main range is a timber porch with a Welsh slate roof, and a doorway with a chamfered surround. In the outer bays of the main range, and the left bay of the wing, are Venetian windows, and the other windows on the front are sash windows. At the rear is a round-arched stair window.	II
Wath Urn Bridge; 54.48869°N 1.67025°W	—	1755	The bridge, which was widened in 1948, carries the B6275 road over Clow Beck. It is in sandstone, and consists of three segmental arches. The bridge has small triangular cutwaters, a parapet with slightly-segmental coping, and an inscribed and dated plaque.	II
Manfield House; 54.51657°N 1.66507°W	—	Late 18th or early 19th century	Cottages combined into a house, it is in stone and cobbles, with quoins, and a hipped pantile roof with stone slates at the eaves. There are two storeys, six bays, and a polygonal left end. On the front is a square bay window with a hipped Westmorland slate roof, and casement windows. At the rear is a round-arched stair window, and in the left return is a French window. In the angle with the polygon is a polygonal two-storey porch with an embattled parapet, containing a round-arched doorway with a fanlight, above which is a round-arched window.	II
Manfield Grange; 54.51616°N 1.65897°W	—	c. 1805	The house is roughcast on a stone plinth, and has a hipped Welsh slate roof. There are two storeys and a U-shaped plan, the main range with a double depth plan, four bays on the front, and three on the right return. To the left is an older single-storey wing with a coped parapet and a pineapple finial. In the right return is a wrought iron porch with a bow-shaped lead roof and a doorway in an architrave, and the windows are sashes.	II
