= Poison pen letter =

Malicious letter, usually anonymous

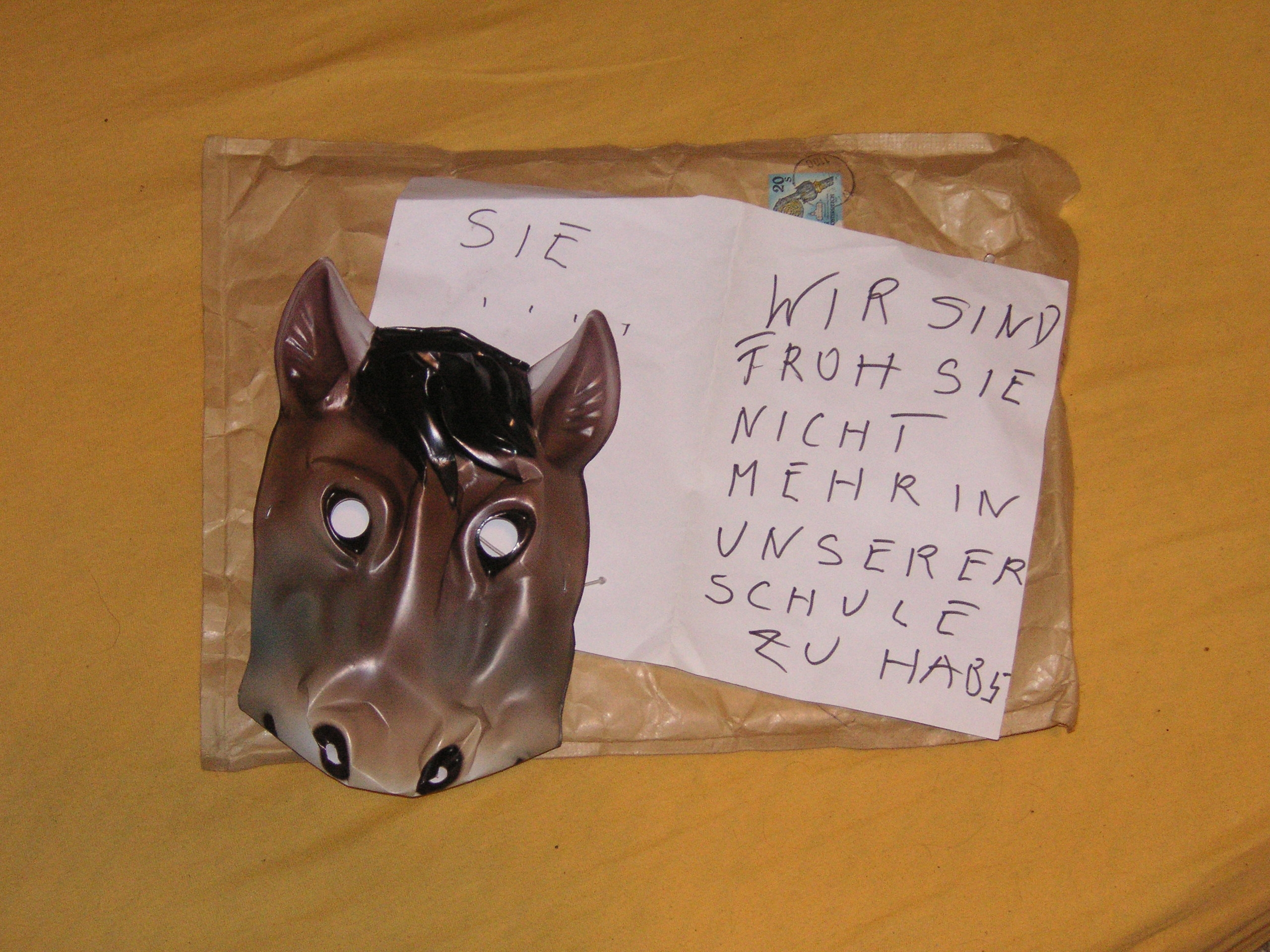
An anonymous poison pen letter to a former teacher. The German text says: "You ... ass. We are glad not to have you at our school any longer." The letter also contained the mask pictured here.

A poison pen letter (or poisoned pen letter) is a letter or note containing unpleasant, abusive, or malicious statements or accusations about the recipient or a third party. It is usually sent anonymously, often by employing the ransom note effect to avoid exposing the author's handwriting. Poison pen letters are usually composed and sent to upset the recipient, and differ from blackmail, which is intended to obtain something from the recipient. The reference to poison is figurative rather than literal.

In the United Kingdom, Section 1 of the Malicious Communications Act 1988 covers most cases of poison pen letters.

== See also ==
- Ransom note
- Dear John letter
- Dear Boss letter
- From Hell letter
- Hate mail
- Chain letter
- Stalking
- James Forster (poison pen letter writer)
- Wicked Little Letters
- Littlehampton libels
