= Battle of Selby =

1644 battle of the First English Civil War

Coordinates: 53°46′54.4″N 1°4′13.1″W

- Part of First English Civil War
Date	11 April 1644; 382 years ago
Location	Selby, North Yorkshire, England
Result	Parliamentarian victory

Belligerents
Royalists	Parliamentarians

Commanders and leaders
Colonel John Belasyse	Lord Fairfax; Sir Thomas Fairfax; Colonel John Lambert; Sir John Meldrum

Strength
c. 2,000-3,000	1,500 cavalry 1,800 infantry

Casualties and losses
1,600 captives	Unknown

Northern England 1642-1644

The Battle of Selby occurred on 11 April 1644 in North Yorkshire during the First English Civil War. In the battle, the Parliamentarians led by Lord Fairfax attacked and captured the strategic Royalist garrison of Selby under the command of John Belasyse.

== Background ==
In January 1644, Belasyse, the Governor of York, was the commander of Royalist forces in Yorkshire. Belasyse's responsibilities included providing for the transport of men and materials in Yorkshire and protecting against incursions by the Parliamentarians. During the winter of 1644, the Parliamentarians conducted numerous raids into Yorkshire, raiding as far north as Whitby in East Riding and Bradford in West Riding.

In response to the Parliamentarian raids, Belasyse relocated his headquarters from York to Selby in an attempt to better guard the southern approach to York. In March, Belasyse's forces were temporarily reinforced with Royalist cavalry from Newark commanded by Major-General George Porter. On 25 March, Belasyse and Porter went on the offensive and attacked the Parliamentarian garrison at Bradford. The attack ended in failure when Porter's cavalry was routed in battle. Both Belasyse and Porter returned to their respective garrisons after the battle.

Sensing an opportunity to catch the Royalists at a weak point, the Parliamentarians assembled an army and planned an assault on Selby as the first step of a push toward York. Lord Fairfax brought a contingent from Hull joining with his son, Sir Thomas Fairfax, who came from Cheshire with his cavalry and a number of Lancashire infantrymen. In addition, the Fairfaxes were joined by Colonel John Lambert from the garrison at Bradford and Sir John Meldrum from the Midlands Association. Combined altogether, the Parliamentarians fielded a force of approximately 1,500 horse and 1,800 foot.

== Battle ==
On 11 April 1644, the Parliamentarian army of Lord Fairfax reached Selby. The town of Selby was unfortified, but surrounded by water obstacles including flooded fields and the River Ouse. Because of the water, there were only four roads leading into the town and on each of the roads, the Royalists had erected and manned barricades.

To attack the town, Lord Fairfax split his forces into three separate units, sending the infantry regiments down three of the roads simultaneously to attack the barriers. After the barriers were overtaken by the infantry, the Parliamentarian plan was to follow with their cavalry. Lord Fairfax commanded a regiment in the attack of Ousegate, Sir John Meldrum led a second regiment in the attack down Gowthorpe Lane, and Colonel Needham led a third regiment down Brayton Lane. Sir Fairfax stood at the ready with the Parliamentarian cavalry.

The advance of the Parliamentarians toward the barriers was met by the musket fire of the Royalist defenders. The Parliamentarians continued to advance along all three fronts of a battle that came to have a number of attacks and counter-attacks. After more than an hour, the Royalists began to abandon the barriers and retire back toward the town. The retreat was successful at the outset as the Royalist cavalry protected their infantry and prevented the Parliamentarians from advancing beyond the barriers. At that point, however, Sir Thomas Fairfax and the Parliamentarian cavalry joined the fray.

Upon entering the field, Sir Thomas Fairfax and his cavalry quickly began to dominate the field. The Royalists cavalry attempted to counter-attack but were beaten back and soon took to flight across the river on a bridge of boats. The Royalist commander, Belasyse, continued to fight attempting to rally his men against the Parliamentarians, but ultimately, he was unhorsed and taken prisoner. By that time, the Parliamentarian infantry had advanced into Selby from three directions surrounding the Royalists. With no route of escape and their commander captured, the Royalists capitulated. A few Royalists were able to escape on their mounts, but the remainder of the garrison, approximately 1,600 men, were taken as captives along with a large amount of arms and ammunition.

== Aftermath ==
The loss of Selby was a disaster for the Royalists in northern England. York was only 20 kilometres north of Selby and was weakly defended with only two Royalist regiments. The Marquess of Newcastle who had been in County Durham defending against the Parliamentarian's Scottish allies was forced to return to York to help with its defence. Eleven days after the fall of Selby, the Parliamentarians began the siege of York which eventually led to the disastrous Royalist defeat at the Battle of Marston Moor and the complete loss of northern England.
