= Cliffe, Richmondshire =

Village and civil parish in North Yorkshire, England

Coordinates: 54°32′03″N 1°40′24″W

Cliffe
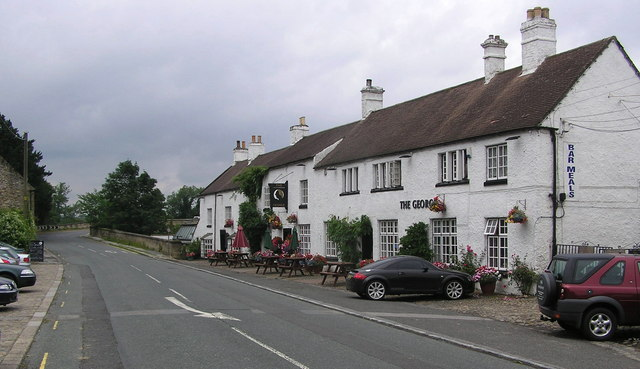
- George Hotel at Cliffe

- Location within North Yorkshire
- Population: 30
- OS grid reference: NZ213154
- Unitary authority: North Yorkshire
- Ceremonial county: North Yorkshire
- Region: Yorkshire and the Humber
- Country: England
- Sovereign state: United Kingdom
- Post town: Darlington
- Postcode district: DL2
- Dialling code: 01325
- Police: North Yorkshire
- Fire: North Yorkshire
- Ambulance: Yorkshire
- UK Parliament: Richmond and Northallerton

Cliffe is a small village and civil parish in the county of North Yorkshire, England. A stream called the Glen runs through the village to the Tees. It is in the Teesdale and Yorkshire Dales national park. It is about 6 miles (10 km) west of Darlington, 10 miles (16 km) north of Richmond and near Piercebridge.

The village has a long history, as shown by the number and range of archaeological sites from tumuli to an English Civil War battleground, most of which are scheduled monuments. and the area is largely agricultural. It is notable for its 17th-century Grade II listed George Hotel, where the story behind the song My Grandfather's Clock is said to have originated in 1875.

In 2015 North Yorkshire County Council estimated the population of the village to be 30. The civil parish's 2011 Census population count was fewer than 100, therefore information taken by ONS was included in the Manfield parish (together with Aldbrough St John and Melsonby parishes) these form the Melsonby ward, which was recorded as 1,406.

From 1974 to 2023 it was part of the district of Richmondshire, it is now administered by the unitary North Yorkshire Council.

== History ==
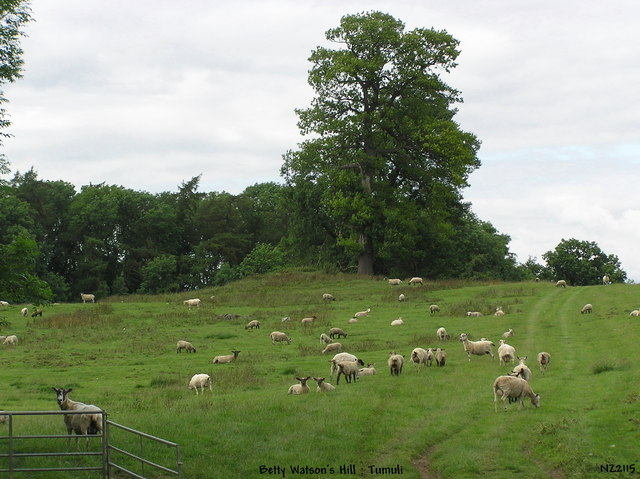
Betty Watson's Hill tumulus

There is evidence of Stone Age, Iron Age, Roman and medieval activity here, although the name "Cliffe" appears to be a medieval name possibly referring to Cliffe Hall and its park. Cliffe has no church, but it does have its own parish, possibly owing to the previous existence of a chapel at Cliffe Hall. At least part of Cliffe shares the Piercebridge postal address, although Piercebridge is north of the Tees, in County Durham: hence some Cliffe locations are described in some records as Piercebridge locations. This area, being close to Manfield, was part of the Gilling West wapentake at the time of the Norman Conquest, so that the later Manfield parish, which included Cliffe, had 2,754 acres (11.15 km^{2}) in Gilling East wapentake and the 700 acres (2.8 km^{2}) comprising Cliffe in Gilling West wapentake. In 1717 there were places in Cliffe known as Haverfield, Willow Pound, Stonebridge-fields, Scroggy Pasture, Lime Kiln-fields and Carlberry, together with the 13th-century mill and mill-dam. In the early 1820s, the village was described thus:

"Cliffe, in the parish of Manfield, wapentake of Gilling West, and liberty of Richmondshire; (the seat of Henry Witham, Esq.) 1½ miles NNW. of Manfield, 6 miles WNW. of Darlington. Here is no place of worship, except a Catholic chapel, the Rev. William Hogarth, minister, Cliffe hall. Pop. 53."

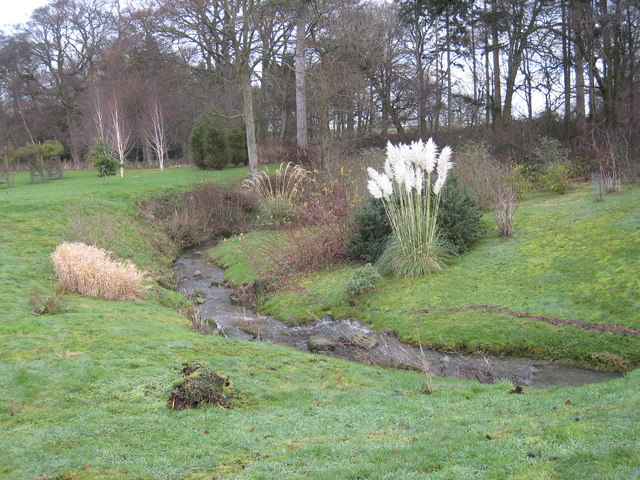
Cliffe Cottages and the Glen

The Georgian mansion Cliffe Hall was sold in 1825 by the Withams to the Wilsons, who rebuilt it in 1859. In 1890 the 700 acres (2.8 km^{2}) of Cliffe were the property of Colonel Wilson. The rateable value was £960, and population 72. The village was said to have derived its name from the cliffs along the river. Cliffe is again described as part of Manfield parish in 1914:

"The park of Cliffe Hall was formed in the 13th century . . . it is surrounded by plantations and traversed by a little stream, the Glen, that finds its way to the Tees. There are tumuli in the park. A lane from Cliffe crosses Watling Street and runs through Manfield to Cleasby . . . In 1717 the lord of Cliffe owned a ferry across the Tees at Manfield."

The area at Cliffe Bank was affected by foot and mouth disease in 2001.

== Geological and political landscape ==
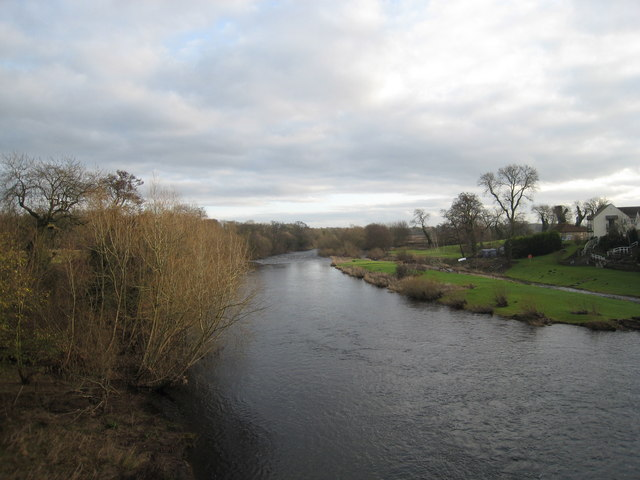
Tees at Cliffe bordered by vegetation over alluvium

The subsoil is magnesian limestone and recent alluvium by the Tees; the soil is a strong clay on a gravelly and sandy subsoil. In 1914 the chief crops raised were wheat, oats and turnips, the occupation of the people being mainly agricultural. In 1868 the land was "divided between arable and meadow, with about 80 acres of woodland". In 2007 the population for the whole of the Richmondshire 001D area, which includes Manfield, Aldbrough St John and Melsonby, was 1,447 residents and 619 dwellings; however Cliffe is much smaller than the other villages in the 001D area. It is in the Melsonby ward, and its councillor is Jimmy Wilson-Petch.

== Local landmarks ==
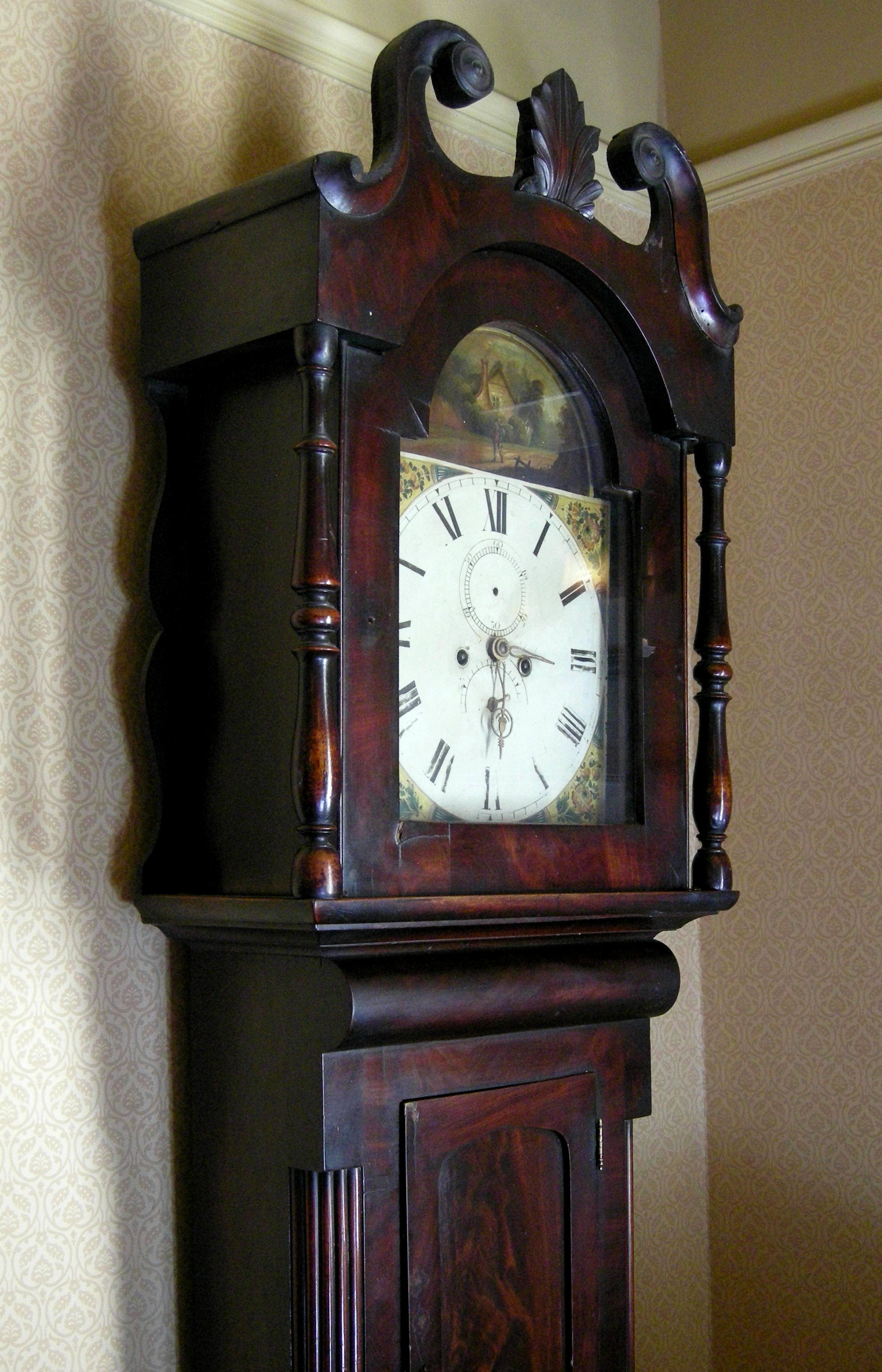
Grandfather clock at The George

The most obvious local landmark is the River Tees on which the village stands. The Grade II listed George Hotel stands near the road-bridge which crosses the Tees coming from Piercebridge, and is said to be the home of My Grandfather's Clock which "stopped short never to go again when the old man died". The 1789 bridge is the local major crossing since the Roman bridge on Dere Street was destroyed. This bridge, of which the northern half is in County Durham and the southern half is in Richmondshire, is close by the old Roman road. Kathleen Wood is next to Cliffe Hall, a surviving Victorian extension of a long-destroyed Georgian mansion. It is now a bed and breakfast establishment.

== Cliffe residents and visitors ==
All Saints church at Manfield, with which Cliffe once shared a parish, contains windows and monuments dated from the 16th to 19th centuries, dedicated to the Witham and Wilson families of Cliffe Hall. The hall came into possession of the Withams by the marriage of George Witham, Esq., with Margaret, daughter and co-heir of John Wawton, of Cliffe. She died in 1479, and is buried at Manfield. Cliffe Hall with its chapel had its place in British clerical history: the Reverend William Hogarth, the first Bishop of Hexham 1850–1861, came from Cliffe. Henry Thornton Maire Witham was the priest at Cliffe chapel in 1800, and he had ten children. The youngest son, Thomas Edward, was baptised in the chapel in 1806, and later became a missionary. After the chapel was closed, T.E. Witham built St Osmund's church at Gainford around 1855.

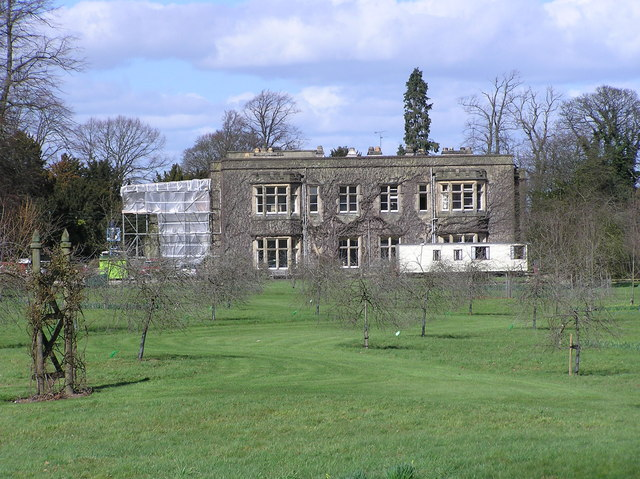
Cliffe Hall after a fire in 2005

Thomas Wright was farmer and corn miller in 1823, possibly at Clowbeck Mill. Henry Clay Work, the American composer of Marching Through Georgia, visited Cliffe and heard in 1875 of the odd incident in the George Hotel when the grandfather clock stopped the moment its owner died. He wrote a celebrated song about it. In 1890, John Gerald Wilson Esquire of Cliffe Hall was a County Magistrate for Gilling West Petty sessional division. Bulmer's Directory 1890 describes him as "Wilson John Gerald, J.P., D.L., Colonel commanding the West Yorkshire Brigade of Volunteers, and 3rd York and Lancashire Regiment of Militia; Alderman North Riding County Council, and ex-officio member of the Darlington Board of Guardians, Cliffe hall." Ernest Hill, M.A. (Camb.), was at Cliffe Lodge in 1890, and John Dent was farmer and miller at Clowbeck Mill, with a possible relative William Dent running Clowbeck Farm. Murrough John Wilson, J.P., of Cliffe was the lord of the manor of Manfield in 1914, and later Conservative MP for Richmond.

== Archaeological sites ==
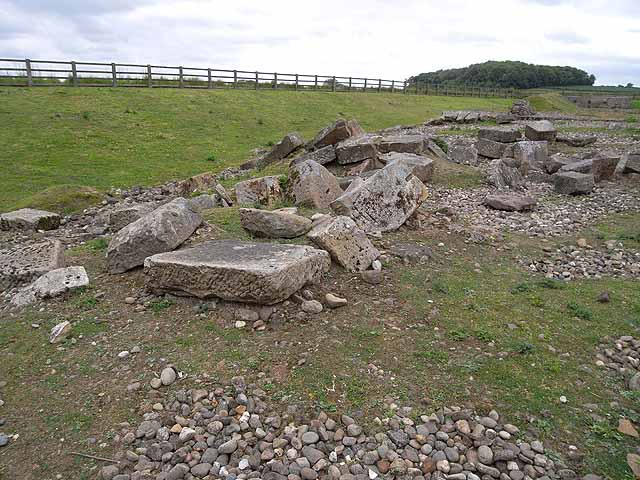
Roman bridge remains at Cliffe

Most of the following are scheduled monuments. The Georgian foundations of the original Cliffe Hall, and the remains of a vicus, lie separately underground nearby. Medieval noblemen are said to have escaped persecution by going through the mythical Hell Hole tunnel in the cliff to Cliffe Hall. An artefact said to be a market cross is still visible in the fields alongside the mounds where the buildings of the vicus were. However this may be identical with the medieval Cliffe Park wayside cross which is dated 1066 to 1539 and described as follows: "Remains consist of the upper part of the shaft with head and arms set into a modern socket stone. The remains do not appear to be in situ and no indication of its original location". Also of archaeological interest is the tumulus known as Betty Watson's Hill. The Piercebridge conservation area does not cover Cliffe due to county boundary limitations. Cliffe forms part of the site of Piercebridge Battle, the "1642 Civil War skirmish between the Earl of Newcastle (Royalist) on the march to York, and Captain Hatham. Both sides had canon, and the Royalists who had canon on Carlbury Hill won the day. Hatham retreated to Tadcaster while the Royalists marched to York". There is a linear feature, from near Namen's Leazes to near Crow Wood, which goes through Aldbrough, Stanwick St John and Cliffe; it could be an earthwork bank, a defence dyke or a trackway. At Cliffe Park there is a double bank earthwork, probably a park pale; and between the banks a small, well-made cobbled track was identified.

=== Digs and finds ===
==== Stone Age and Iron Age ====
A Neolithic leaf arrowhead dated 4000 to 2201 BCE was found at Cliffe. It is thought that there could have been a late Iron Age trade route south-west from the bridge area at Cliffe to Reeth and Maiden Castle via Stanwick and Castle Steads.

==== Bronze Age ====
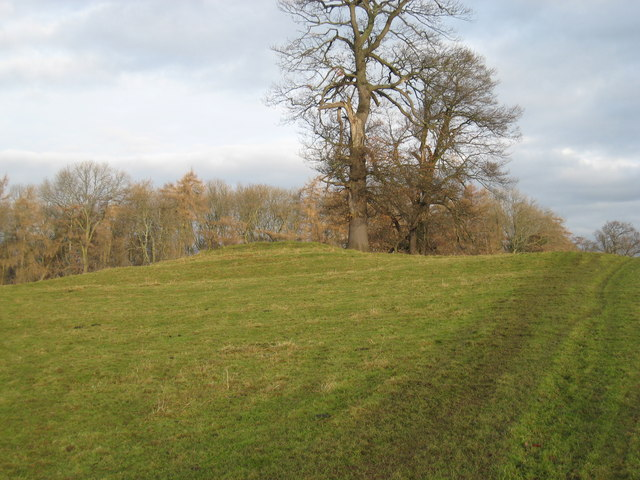
Tumulus: Betty Watson's Hill

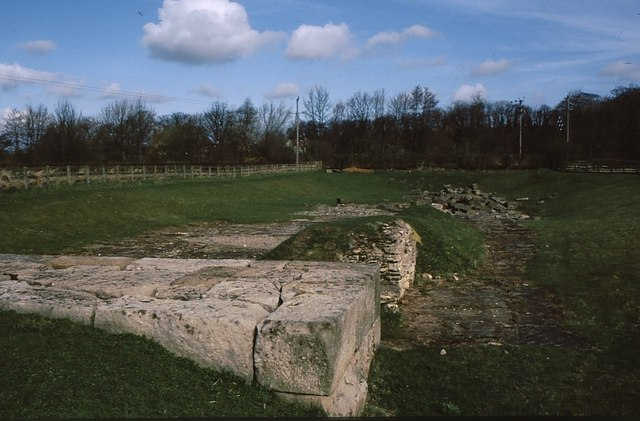
South bank remains of Roman bridge

The Betty Watson's Hill Bronze Age barrow 1,120 feet (340 m) east of Cliffe Hall was excavated in 1904. It was described as a flat-topped bowl barrow, and it was noted that "the large hole in the centre is probably due to robbers or an unrecorded excavation". In 2007, a cup-marked 29×23×16 cm boulder with two 5 cm cups was found in field-edge dumps 50m south-east of the Betty Watson's Hill barrow. "The cobble was removed from the field edge and placed back on the barrow top. This now puts an early Bronze Age date to the monument." The boulder is believed to have originated in the robbed-out barrow. A round barrow is recorded 190m south-east of Cliffe Hall.

==== Roman ====
In 1994, the observation of groundworks at the George Hotel and Cliffe substation recorded part of a Roman road as well as undated disturbance. In the same year, a section through Dere Street was exposed by excavations carried out in a garage development area, and some pottery and tile found. Excavations in 1982–1986 uncovered a vicus: an "area of Roman settlement on the south side of the River Tees. This area was bisected by the Roman road. Excavations and watching briefs have been undertaken. These have found buildings, kilns, clay occupation surfaces, Dere Street and many artefacts. Information is held on parish files." The same vicus had been excavated around 1971: "Foundations of a Romano-British settlement were revealed by topsoil stripping. Excavation revealed a number of foundations of buildings, streets, ditches and much occupational debris. Occupation was onsite from the middle of the second century to the end of the fourth century. Settlement may lie on either side of Dere Street realignment." In 1849, a Roman inscribed tombstone was found at Cliffe Bank. According to the inscription, the tombstone was "erected by the wife for her husband called Gracilis, a centurion from Upper Germany in the XXII legion and sent to Britain in the early third century."

==== Time Team investigation ====
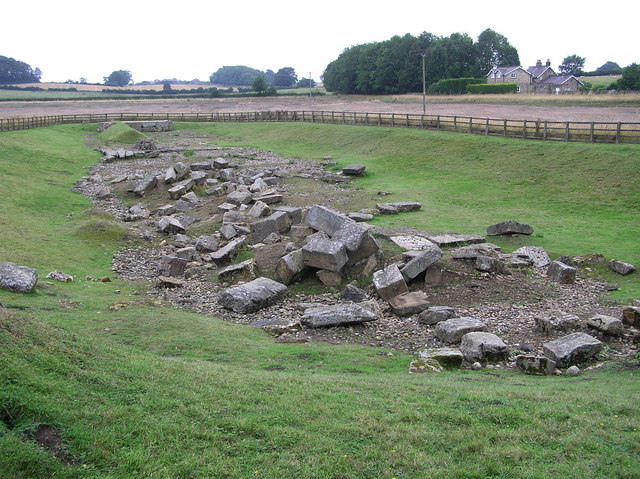
The southern end of the Roman bridge remains at Cliffe, looking north towards Piercebridge

At the end of June to the beginning of July 2009, archaeological television programme Time Team investigated the Roman remains of Piercebridge Roman Fort and the supposed Roman bridge, and it is now suspected that the remains on the south bank are not a bridge at all, but the footings of a jetty, and that the location of the Roman bridge is unknown. A similar view had previously been suggested by Raymond Selkirk. Gravel extraction in the 1940s and later landfill and landscaping on the south bank have hampered archaeology.

== Listed buildings ==
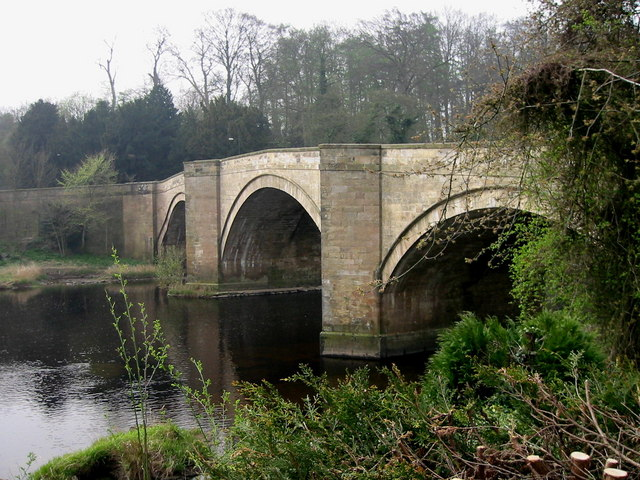
The Grade II listed bridge over the Tees

- George Hotel, formerly Bridge Inn, listed in 1968 as Grade II, no.322655 at location NGR: NZ2116615516 on the B6275 road. Listing description: parts of it date from the 17th, 18th and 19th centuries, and it includes a mounting block and chamfered ashlar fireplace.
- The Piercebridge road bridge, of which the southern half is in Cliffe, listed in 1951 as Grade II*, number 322654 at location NGR: NZ2108215554. Listing description: early 16th century, repaired 1673, widened 1789; built of ashlar and coursed rubble sandstone. On the upstream side, the outer two arches are 16th-century, and the central arch is 1673; the parapet is 18th-century. The downstream side is dated 1789. The central pedestrian retreats on both sides have recessed panels with illegible inscriptions, and a similar panel in the southernmost downstream retreat. In the centre of the downstream parapet there are two recessed panels marking the boundary between County Durham and Yorkshire, the northern one with inscription "Co.D." just legible.

== Bibliography ==
- Muir, Richard, The Lost Villages of Britain (The History Press Ltd, 1 July 2008) ISBN 0-7509-5039-0, ISBN 978-0-7509-5039-8
- Page, William (editor),"Parishes: Gilling", in Victoria County History: A History of the County of York North Riding: Volume 1 (1914) pp. 71–84. Date accessed: 11 January 2010.
- Page, William (editor), "Parishes: Manfield", in Victoria County History: A History of the County of York North Riding: Volume 1 (1914), pp. 186–190. Date accessed: 11 January 2010.
