= Piercebridge Roman Fort =

Roman fort in Durham, England

- Morbium, Vinovium
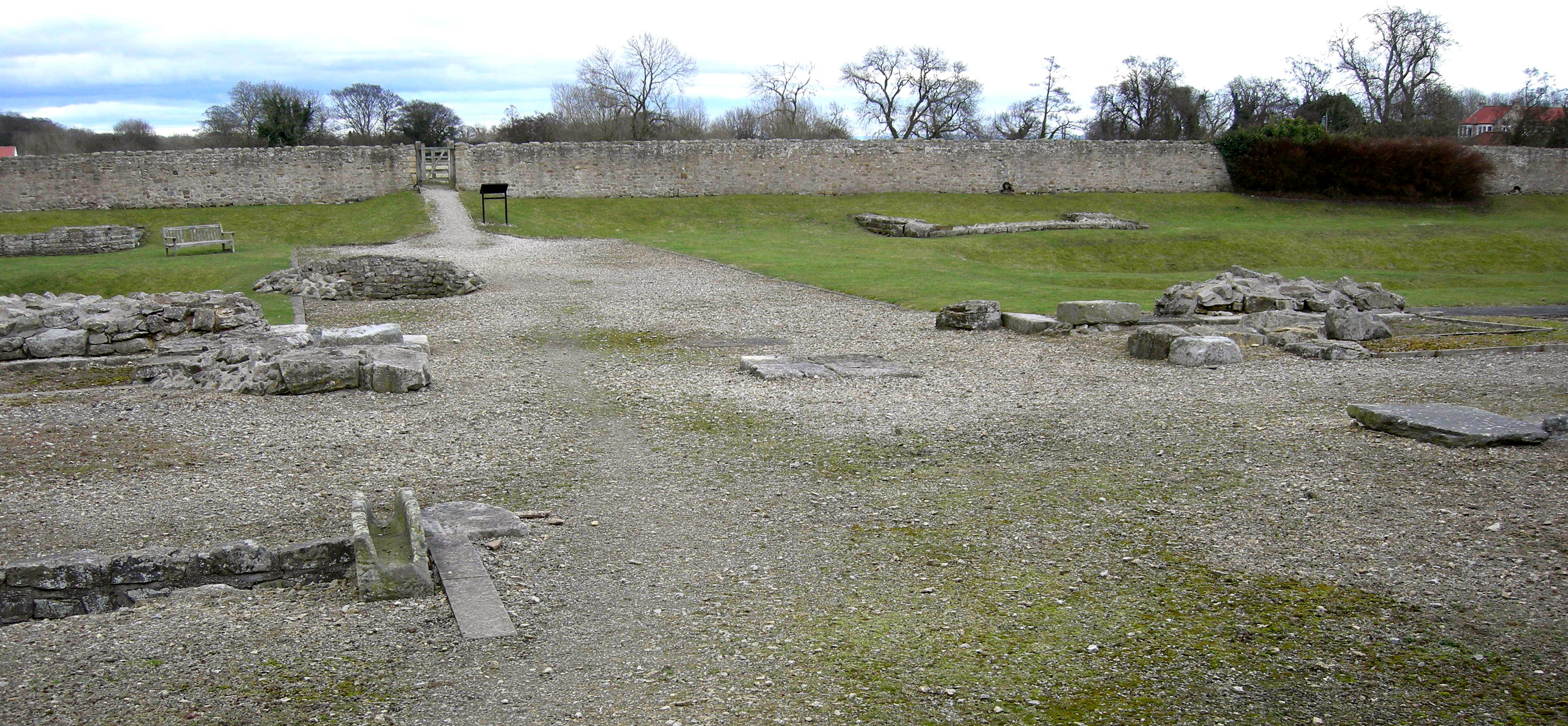
- Piercebridge Roman Fort

- Location within County Durham
- 54.535°N 1.678°W
- Location: Piercebridge, County Durham, England

History
- Founded: c. 2nd century AD
- Abandoned: 5th or 6th century

Site notes
- Excavation dates: 1938 - 1939; 1969 - 1981
- Archaeologists: Edward Wooler; Dennis Harding; Peter R. Scott; David Mason

Piercebridge Roman Fort is a scheduled ancient monument situated in the village of Piercebridge on the banks of the River Tees in modern-day County Durham, England. There were Romans here from about AD 70 until at least the early 5th century. There was an associated vicus and bath house at Piercebridge, and another vicus and a villa south of the river at Cliffe. The Victorians used carved stones from this site when they built St Mary's church at Gainford. Part of the site is under Piercebridge village green.

The fort was situated on Dere Street, the major Roman road linking York to the north. The fort was strategically placed to control the crossing of the road over the river Tees, and the major Roman bridge crossing it.

== History ==
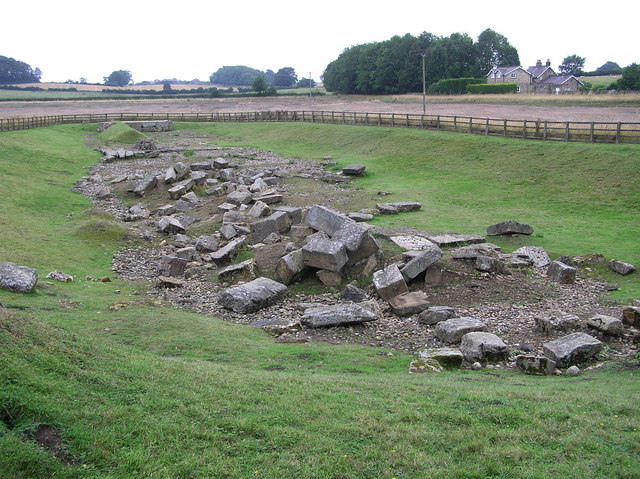
Piercebridge Roman Bridge

=== Fort ===
Lumps and bumps in the village green at Piercebridge, as well as extensive excavated Roman buildings, show that there is a Roman fort underneath it. The Roman name for the site is uncertain, although it has been suggested that it could be Morbium, a placename listed in the 4th century list of Roman officials, known as the Notitia Dignitatum. That said, there are other arguably better candidates, such as Scaftworth, near Bawtry. An old theory that Piercebridge may have been Magis is now generally rejected, the name more probably applying to the fort at Burrow Walls, near Workington in Cumbria. Another possible name has been put forward on the basis of the text of one of the Vindolanda Tablets dating from the mid-first century AD, in which reference is made to Bremesio, the context of which strongly suggests an identification with Piercebridge.

Dere Street was the main road that the Piercebridge Fort guarded. It was the furthest south of four forts along Dere Street in what is now County Durham, the others being at Binchester, Lanchester and Ebchester. Artefacts found in Piercebridge suggest that there were Romans on the site around the river as far back as AD 70, perhaps because there was a ford or ferry to be defended from the Brigantes. A civil settlement in the Toft field existed by AD 125, and a military installation alongside Dere Street south of the Tees appeared in the late 2nd century AD. However, the fortifications which can be seen today on the north side of the river were not built until AD 260 to 270, when the other Roman settlements north and south of the river began to decrease in size. The fort was maintained from around AD 290 to 350, with later development, by which time the inhabitants were mostly inside the fort area. It was inhabited until the 6th century AD, although some theories state that it was finally abandoned in the early 5th century. It is now a scheduled ancient monument. It was not the only Roman fort next to a bridge hereabouts; there was also Greta Bridge, on the River Greta to the south.

==== Structure of fort and bridge ====
The fort appears to have followed the standard Roman plan, being rectangular in shape with towers at each corner and four gates. Inside were barracks, workshops, granaries and the garrison headquarters with the commandant's separate accommodation.

According to the 2005 Conservation Area appraisal, the bridge had a south abutment and four piers; however it has been suggested by some archaeologists such as Raymond Selkirk that the existing remains do not represent a bridge, and that it is a dam and spillway. If it is a Roman bridge, then it would be one of only two remaining in the country; the other one being Chesters Bridge in Northumberland

=== Vicus ===
To the east of the fort in Tofts Field there is a vicus which began in the 1st century AD and survived into the early 5th century: a civilian settlement outside the fort's boundaries for providers of goods and services to the fort itself. According to cropmarks, it apparently consisted of about 30 buildings whose inhabitants probably traded via the river from the late 1st century, but fewer people lived there once the fort's defences were built. This vicus probably followed the building of the Roman villa south of the river at Holme House, which in turn began as a native roundhouse. There was an associated vicus at the other side of the river crossing, at Cliffe, Richmondshire.

=== Bath house ===
A Roman bath house was still standing at the south-east corner of the fort-site in the 13th century when St Mary's Chapel was built to incorporate part of it: possibly the wall with a rounded arched doorway, which is still visible from a distance on private land. In the traditional manner, the garrison bath house stands outside the fort itself. It is a Grade II* listed building and scheduled ancient monument.

== Archaeology ==
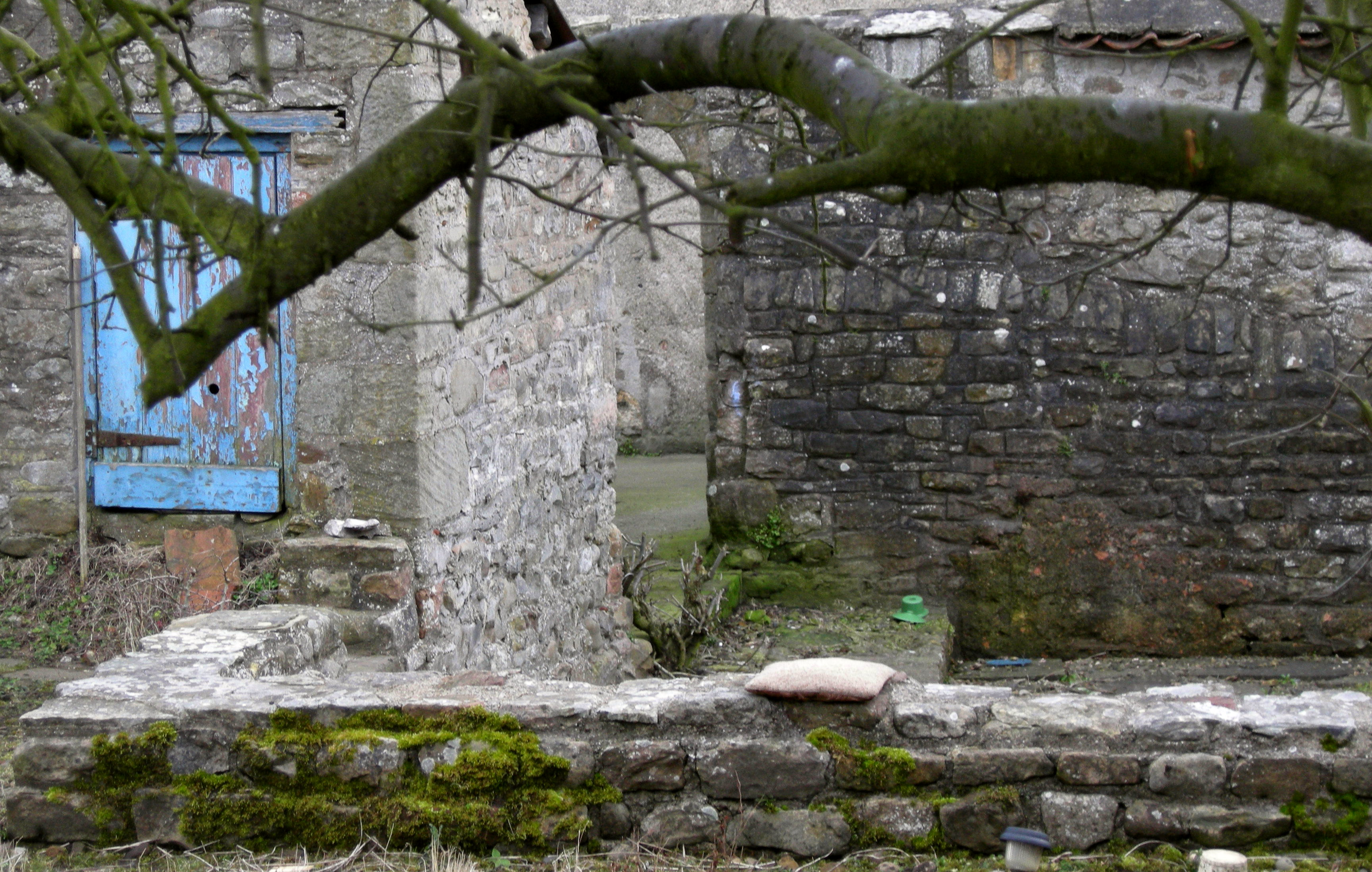
Remains of a Roman bath house, once incorporated into St Mary's Chapel

Around 1910, Edward Wooler discovered a large, worked Roman stone which he believed to have been part of the original Roman bridge.

Because modern Piercebridge never extended beyond the original Roman boundaries of the fort, the north and west earthworks are preserved, and parts of these have been excavated. An excavation was made in 1938, where a guard chamber each side of the western gateway was found. They also exposed the wall of the outer rampart, near the north-west corner, and in 1939 exposed part of the south outer wall.

Another dig was carried out by Dennis Harding and Peter Scott between 1969 and 1981. A 1973 dig found a 3rd-century rectangular building with hypocaust.

The archaeological television programme Time Team investigated Piercebridge Roman Fort in 2009, and showed that early bridge timbers in the riverbed were Roman. Among the finds were a small lead goat and a hairpin. They also found one track of Dere Street leading to a bridge and dating to Domitian.

Dr Hella Eckardt and Dr Philippa Walton have spent over 20 years cataloging and interpreting thousands of Roman artifacts that were found at the bottom of the River Tees, near the Roman fort.

The site has been reassessed by archaeologist Dr David Mason in 2006, and the archive from the excavations is at the Bowes Museum.

Inscriptions found here attest to the presence of members of the Legio II Augusta, the Legio VI Victrix, and the Legio XXII Primigenia, as well as worship of Jupiter and Mars.

Other finds include a bronze figure of a ploughman with oxen, which is now in the British Museum, along with Roman coins dated early 4th century. St Mary's 1855 church building at Gainford contains Roman worked stones from this site. Other finds have included kilns and Roman pottery, a metalworking site, a carved stone altar and burials including gravestones and a lead coffin.

== Public display ==
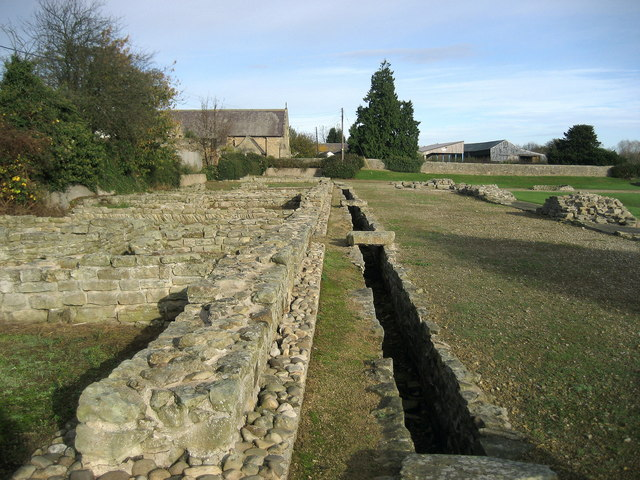
The fort, showing the culvert

Visible Roman remains at the eastern part of the site include parts of the east gate and wall defences, a courtyard building and an internal road, and a section of the eastern elevation is now preserved and on permanent public display. The original rectangular defence pits are lawned over between the wall and the outer ditch. There were obstacle pits, and also man-traps or camouflaged holes spiked with large, pointed, wooden stakes for unsuspecting attackers to fall into. These were roughly square holes, probably originally covered with undergrowth. Beyond the fort wall was a road with a drain or culvert which still exists.

The commander's substantial house is beyond this road and built on river-pebbles. He had his own bath-house, and this is the one at the north of the site on private property, but visible over a fence. Admission is free and the site is open to the public all year round. A large proportion of the substantial 11-acre (45,000 m^{2}) fort now lies under later buildings.

Some of the artefacts found at the site are on show at Bowes Museum at Barnard Castle.

Remains of the bridge which carried Dere Street over the River Tees can be seen on the south side of the river at Cliffe, Richmondshire.

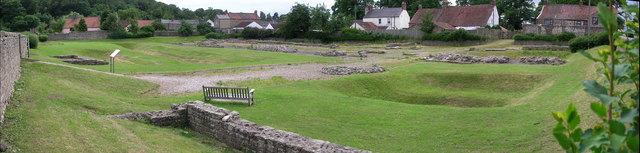
Piercebridge Roman Fort looking south southwest

== See also ==
- Castra (Roman fort)
- Roman Britain
- Roman bridge
- Piercebridge
- Cliffe, Richmondshire
