= All Saints' Church, Manfield =

Church in Manfield, North Yorkshire, England

Coordinates: 54°30′55″N 1°39′27″W

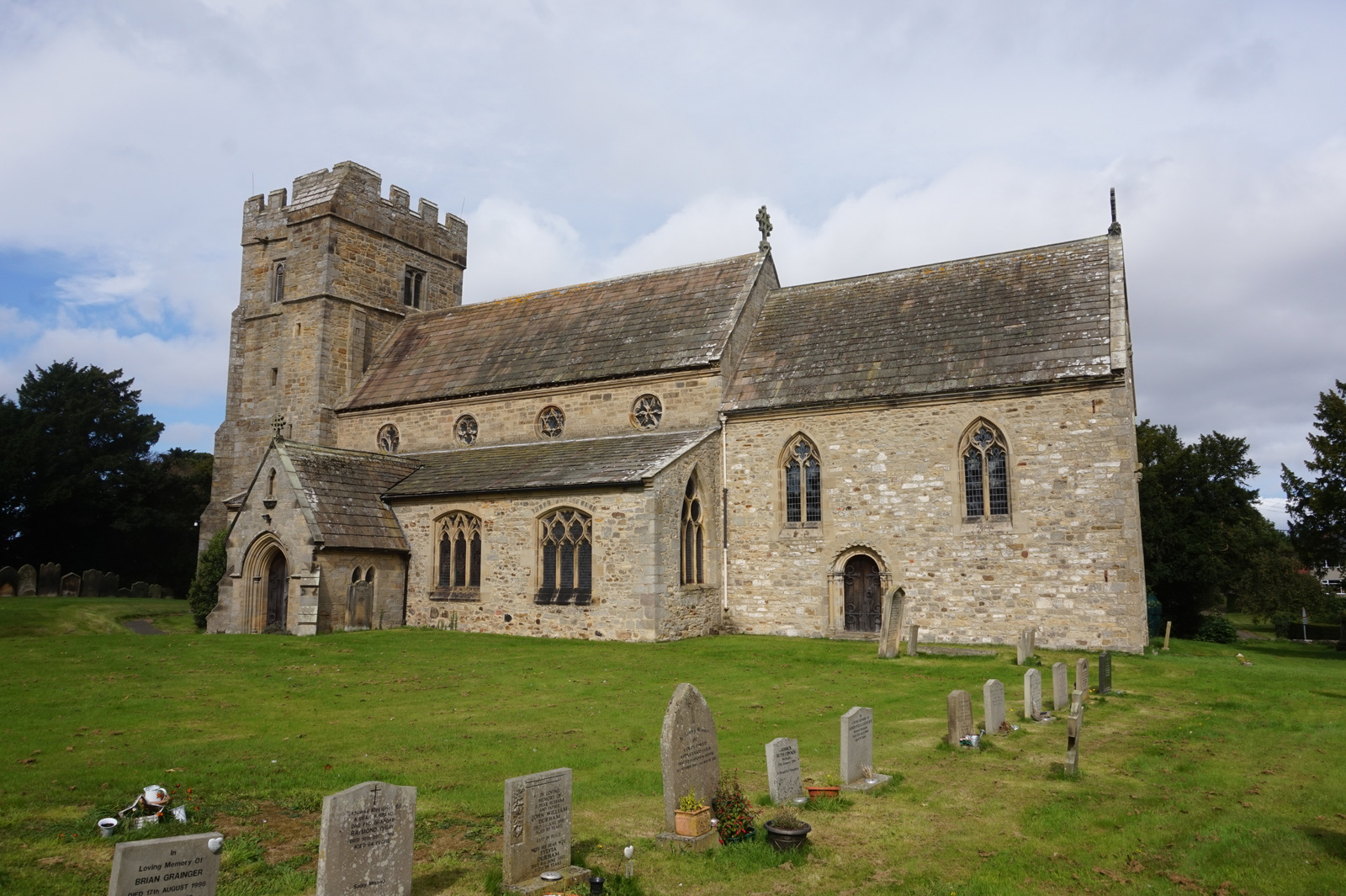
The church, in 2020

All Saints' Church is the parish church of Manfield, a village in North Yorkshire, in England.

The church was built in the 12th century, consisting of a nave and chancel. In about 1240, north and south aisles were added, and the doorway was moved to the new south wall. About 1330, the chancel was rebuilt, the nave extended one bay to the west, and a north arcade added. A tower was added in the 16th century. The church was restored between 1849 and 1855, the work including a new south porch, and the replacement of many of the windows. The church was grade II* listed in 1968.

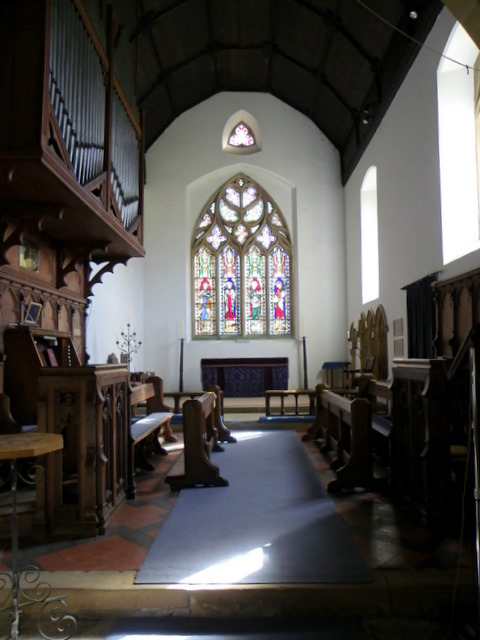
The chancel

It is built in sandstone with stone slate roofs, and consists of a nave with a clerestory, north and south aisles, a south porch, a chancel with a north vestry, and a west tower. The tower has three stages, stepped diagonal buttresses, a chamfered plinth, a projecting stair turret, a string course, a west window, a clock face, two-light bell openings, and an embattled parapet. The clock was installed in 1841. Inside, there is an early piscina, a sedilia, an altar rail which is probably early 18th century, and a font and pulpit in marble from about 1876. There are three wall monuments to the Witham family, some Mediaeval grave covers, and an oak chest dated 1688.

== See also ==
- Grade II* listed churches in North Yorkshire (district)
- Listed buildings in Manfield
