= Piercebridge =

Village in County Durham, England

Coordinates: 54.53684°N 1.67777°W

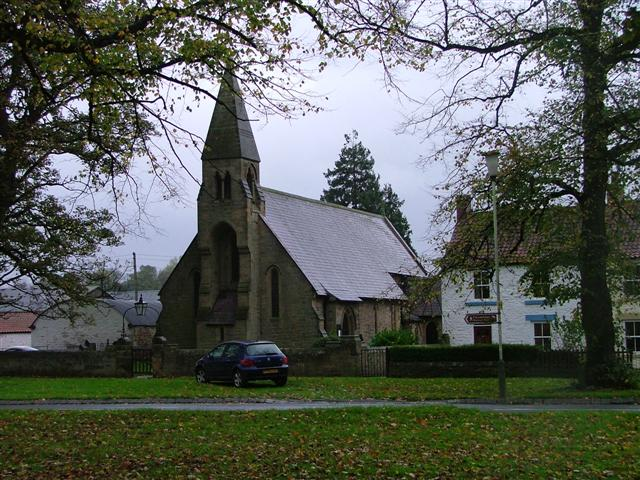
- St Mary's Church, Piercebridge

- Location within County Durham
- Population: 113 (2011)
- OS grid reference: NZ209157
- Unitary authority: Darlington
- Ceremonial county: County Durham
- Region: North East
- Country: England
- Sovereign state: United Kingdom
- Post town: DARLINGTON
- Postcode district: DL2
- Dialling code: 01325
- Police: Durham
- Fire: County Durham and Darlington
- Ambulance: North East
- UK Parliament: Darlington

Piercebridge is a village and civil parish in the borough of Darlington and the ceremonial county of Durham, England. It is situated a few miles west of the town of Darlington. It is on the site of a Roman fort of 260–270 CE, which was built at the point where Dere Street crossed the River Tees. Part of the fort is under the village green. The village is sited where the York to Newstead Roman road known as Dere Street crosses the River Tees.

The excavated Roman fort is open to the public and the remains of Piercebridge Roman Bridge over the Tees now lie around 90 metres (300 ft) south of the current course of the river, approximately 450 metres (1,480 ft) east of Piercebridge, at the east side of Cliffe, Richmondshire.

== Toponym ==
Piercebridge is named after its Roman bridge or brigg: in 1104 it was Persebrig; in 1577 it was Priestbrigg. It is thought that pierce comes from pershe, meaning osiers, perhaps because the bridge was at least partly made of osier twigs in 1050 when the name is first recorded. Alternative suggested meanings, of "priest" and the name "Piers", would be too modern in origin for such an old place name.

== Demographics ==
The population of the civil parish as of the 2011 census was 113.

== History ==
=== Roman ===
The Romans built a fort here to defend the crossing against the Brigantes. The Roman fort known as Morbium is now located under the village green. It was sited adjacent to Dere Street, at the point where the Roman road crossed the River Tees. The fort was occupied continuously from about 70 CE to at least the fifth century. A civilian settlement was to the east of the fort in Tofts Field. A Roman bath house was incorporated into St Mary's chapel (now on private land). The archaeology television programme Time Team was here in 2009, attracted by Piercebridge Roman Fort. Following the departure of the Romans in 410 CE, the area in and around the fort remained inhabited for about another century. The plain it sits on in the Tees Valley was the site of Battle of Catraeth. The kingdom of Catraeth was composed of the descendants of the Brigantes.

=== Medieval ===
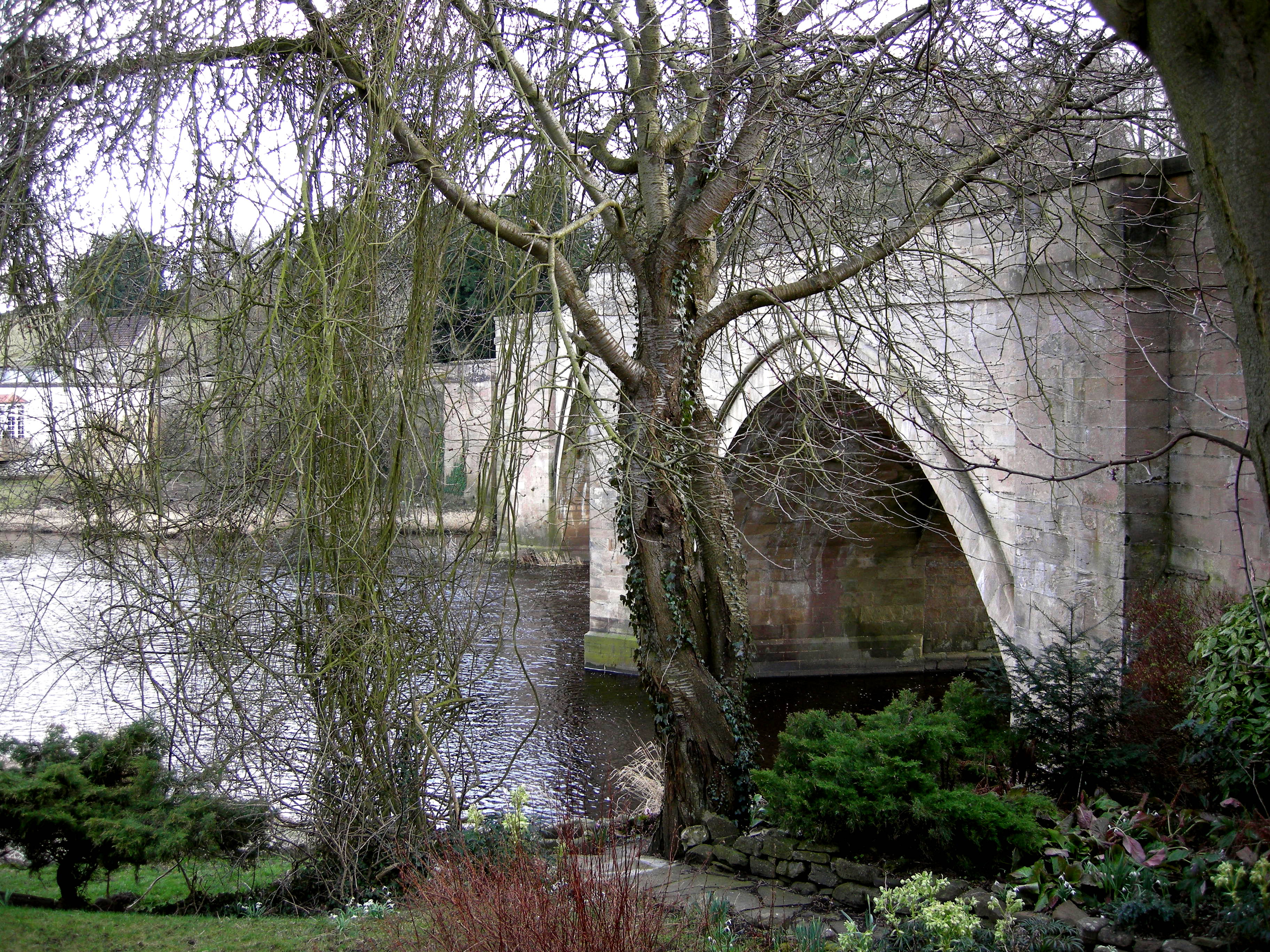
East side of bridge, from Piercebridge, looking south

There was no permanent inhabitation in the area until the Normans arrived in the mid 11th century.

=== 16th century onwards ===
There was no medieval Piercebridge parish, but there was a chapel recorded in 1546. The name of White Cross Farm and cottage may come from the 17th century apocryphal tale that one of the Dukes of Cleveland demanded the whitewashing of houses on his land so that he could recognise his own property should he require shelter during a storm while hunting. The 18th-century farmhouse, Piercebridge Grange, may be on the site of a monastic grange. It was tenanted by James Rawe, gentleman, in 1847. It is now a Grade II listed building, but was derelict by 2008. The Battle of Piercebridge was partly fought on the bridge, when on 1 December 1642 a small Royalist contingent including William Cavendish defended it against Parliamentarians led by Lord Fairfax. St Mary's church and churchyard were used for 115 extant memorials and burials from 1836 to 1987. In 2001 the Piercebridge area suffered in the foot and mouth epidemic. By 1887, the village had grown to cover 973 acres (3.94 km^{2}) of which 17 were water. It had a population of 206, a railway station and a post office. Since then it has lost the railway station, gained few residents, and retained its post office.

A clock in the George Hotel inspired Henry Clay Work's 1876 song "My Grandfather's Clock". The clock was said to have been owned by two brothers named Jenkins. When one brother died, the clock began losing time, and it stopped for ever upon the death of the other.

== Preservation ==
Within the village there are numerous Georgian and Victorian cottages: some painted white or cream; some of one storey only. There are several Grade II listed buildings in the village and its environs, including White Cross Farmhouse, White Cross Cottage, Carlbury Bridge, Piercebridge Grange Farmhouse, the Church of St Mary and its wall and gate, and numbers 2, 28, 29 and 30 on The Green. The Grange farm buildings, however, were developed into residential properties in 2008. Piercebridge Roman Bridge and the medieval chapel ruins on Roman foundations behind Bath House in Tees View are listed Grade II*. The bridge carrying the main B6275 road was originally built in the early 16th century and was widened in 1781; it is Grade II* listed and a Scheduled Ancient Monument. The village green contains some very old trees, and in the river are trout and grayling. At the north end of the village, near the A67 is the Carlbury Arms pub. There is also a Farmway Country Store and Piercebridge Feed Company, retailing rural supplies. The dismantled Tees Valley Railway has become the Tees Valley Railway Path. Church services are held at St Mary's every other week, and there is also a Wesleyan Methodist chapel.

== Transport ==
Originally Dere Street crossed the Tees 260 yards (240 m) further upstream, but in 1771 a flood washed away the remains of the old Roman bridge, and in 1789 a new bridge replaced the ferry. The 1806 map shows Dere Street as the main route via Piercebridge between Richmond and Bishop Auckland, although the Ripon-Durham route went via Darlington. The 1904 map shows the route diverted via Staindrop, and that part of Dere Street between Piercebridge and Bishop Auckland had become a minor road. This was possibly due to the advent of the NER Darlington and Barnard Castle railway (1856) whose Piercebridge station closed to passengers in 1964. According to the land-usage map of 1942, this was an area of arable land and pasture, and the urbanisation around Darlington had not yet begun to encroach.
