= James Forster (poison pen letter writer) =

Convicted English academic (1933–2017)

- Born: James Forster; 1933; England
- Died: 2017 (aged 83–84); Manfield, England
- Motive: Abuse campaign
- Convictions: Threatening to destroy property Sending indecent mail Incitement to commit burglary
- Criminal charges: Threatening to destroy property Sending indecent mail Incitement to commit burglary

James Forster (1933–2017) was an English criminal who, between 1987 and 1999, orchestrated a hate campaign during which he sent 200 poison pen letters to residents of Manfield, district of North Yorkshire. A former Open University lecturer, he was found guilty of three counts of threatening to destroy property, three of sending indecent mail, and one of incitement to commit burglary. He died in 2017.

== Early life ==
Forster was born in 1933 and was employed by the National Coal Board for 11 years before attending Kings College at the University of Newcastle upon Tyne. There he studied for a BSc in applied sciences before taking an MSc and PhD.

He then lectured at the University of Nottingham for five years before joining the Open University. He rose through the ranks from staff tutor to senior lecturer between 1971 and 1998, including a spell as acting deputy regional director in 1995.

== Crimes ==
Between 1987 and 1999, residents of Manfield, district of North Yorkshire, began receiving poison pen letters. The poison pen letter writer stalked a woman, Joanne Kellett, and sent a letter to her, accusing her of being a prostitute, and threatened to put a bomb down the chimney at the home of Molly Christian, one of his first victims, to whom he sent three anonymous letters. Forster also sent pornography to a 13-year-old girl. Shirley Dodd, a mother of two, had her son Jeremy, 11, accused of sending the letters, but he was soon ruled out when Forster was caught. Prosecutor Michael O'Neill said it was telling that from the time Dr Forster was first arrested to the time of him coming to court, only one letter had been sent to anyone in Manfield. It was an envelope full of dog excrement. Forster had tried to buy Molly Christian's home when she put it up for sale in 1989, but later dropped out. He turned his attention to the people who bought the house, Roy and Val Kellett and their daughter Joanne, then aged 19. Forster sent an anonymous letter to a man in Darlington inviting him to burgle the Kelletts' home when they were away on holiday.

== Arrest and trial ==
Forster was arrested in 2001 and after an eight-day trial at Teesside Crown Court, a jury took four-and-a-quarter hours to find him guilty of three counts of threatening to destroy property, three of sending indecent mail, and one of incitement to commit burglary. However, he was cleared of three charges of damaging neighbours' property. He was also accused of throwing a paint bomb at a house and threatening to throw a paint bomb at a car. Forster was sentenced to four months imprisonment, and made to pay costs.

== Later life and death ==
Forster returned to Manfield upon his release. He lived quietly with his wife until his death in 2017.
