= Battle of Tadcaster =

Battle of the First English Civil War

Coordinates: 53.8852°N 1.262°W

- Part of the First English Civil War
Date	7 December 1642
Location	Tadcaster, Yorkshire
Result	Royalist victory

Belligerents
Royalists	Parliamentarians

Commanders and leaders
Earl of Newcastle	Ferdinando Fairfax, Lord Fairfax

Strength
c. 4,000	900–1,500
- Tadcaster within North Yorkshire

The Battle of Tadcaster took place during the First English Civil War on 7 December 1642, when a Royalist force attacked the Parliamentarian garrison of Tadcaster, Yorkshire, which was held by between 900 and 1,500 soldiers under the command of Ferdinando Fairfax, Lord Fairfax. The Earl of Newcastle marched out of York on 6 December, and split his force of 6,000 into two; he took 4,000 infantry down the main York–Tadcaster road to attack the town from the east, while sending a deputy, the Earl of Newport, with a further 1,500 to circle around and trap the Parliamentarians by attacking from the north-west.

Newcastle's infantry engaged the town on the morning of 7 December, but after some initial minor incursions, the battle settled into an exchange of musket fire. Newport's detachment never joined the battle. Fairfax was nevertheless forced to retreat overnight, as he was running short of gunpowder, and Newcastle occupied the town the following day. He subsequently garrisoned a number of nearby towns, and cut Fairfax off from the West Riding of Yorkshire.

== Background ==
In December 1642, the First English Civil War had been running for four months, since King Charles I had raised his banner in Nottingham and declared the Earl of Essex, and by extension Parliament, traitors. That action had been the culmination of religious, fiscal and legislative tensions going back over fifty years.

=== State of the war in Yorkshire ===
Even before the formal start of the war, Yorkshire became a key area in the conflict. After King Charles I attempted to arrest five members of parliament in January 1642, members of the gentry started openly taking sides and preparing for battle. Sir John Hotham seized Hull for parliament the same month, and after fleeing London, the King established himself at York in March. The King twice attempted to take Hull in 1642 without success. Although Charles subsequently returned south, his wife, Henrietta Maria (formally known as Queen Mary) had travelled to the Low Countries to acquire weapons and the Earl of Newcastle was charged with ensuring her safe travel through the northeast when she returned. On the other side, Ferdinando Fairfax, Lord Fairfax, was appointed as the commander of parliament's forces in Yorkshire.

== Prelude ==
In response to requests from Yorkshire Royalists, Newcastle advanced into Yorkshire with around 8,000 men, defeating the Parliamentarians at the Battle of Piercebridge, and established himself in York on 3 December. Lord Fairfax had himself been leading a Parliamentarian army towards York, but when he received news of the Royalist victory at Piercebridge he stopped at Tadcaster, around 10 miles (16 km) south-west of York. Newcastle's advance had split the Parliamentarian forces, and shifted the balance of power in the county. He soon took the opportunity to march on Tadcaster and attempt to defeat the Parliamentarians in detail.

== Battle ==
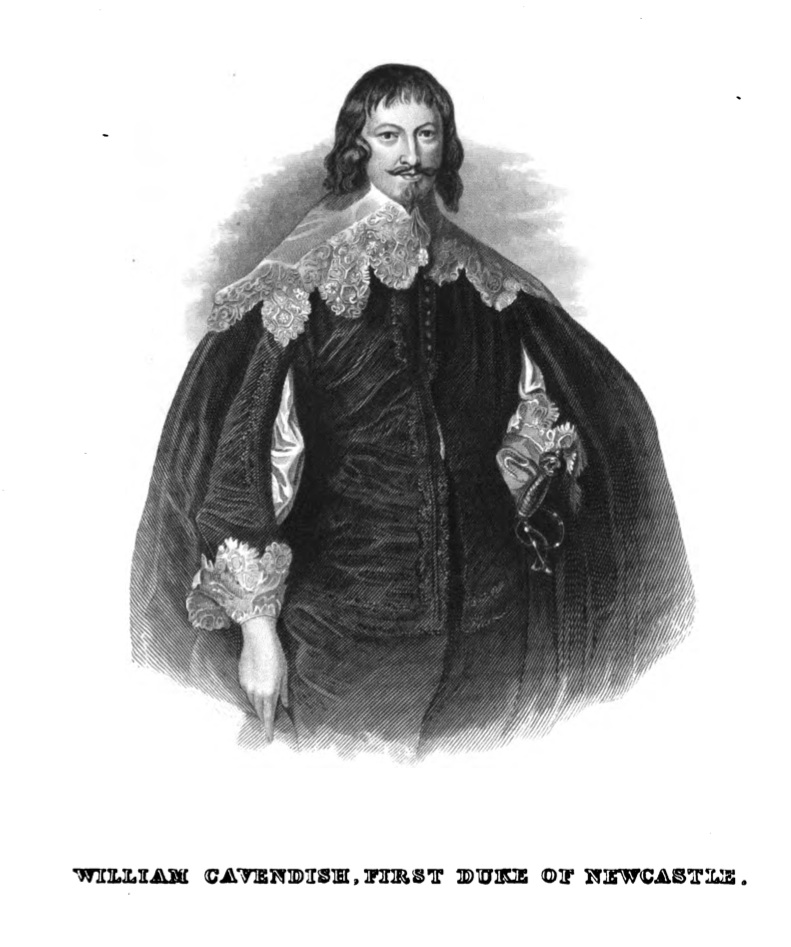
The Earl of Newcastle led the Royalist force which captured Tadcaster.

On 6 December, Newcastle approached Tadcaster with two forces totalling around 6,000 men. The larger one, consisting of about 4,000 foot and several hundred horse and commanded by Newcastle himself, headed directly down the road from York to attack Tadcaster from the east. At the same time, the Earl of Newport with 1,500 horse and dragoons, the bulk of Newcastle's mounted men, was to circle around through Wetherby and attack Fairfax from the north-west.

Fairfax had gathered between 900 and 1,500 soldiers in the town. Tadcaster lies mainly on the west bank of the River Wharfe and access to the town for an army approaching from York was by means of a single stone bridge. To cover the approach to this bridge, Fairfax had constructed a redoubt on the east side of the river where the road from York crosses a low hill. In addition, part of the roadway across the bridge had been demolished and the gap covered by planks which could be quickly removed on the enemy’s approach.

In the face of the large Royalist army, Fairfax and his commanders held a council of war, and decided to withdraw from the town the next morning, 7 December. However, by the time they had gathered their men to leave, fighting had broken out on the edge of town. The Royalist infantry was attacking the east side of town, still defended by the Parliamentarian rearguard. The attack meant that retreat was no longer possible, and Fairfax sent his men back to join the town's defence.

The initial Royalist attack was thwarted, but subsequently some of Newcastle’s men managed to get into the town and occupy some houses near the bridge. This threatened to cut off the Parliamentarian force at the redoubt from their reserves in the town. A counterattack was launched under Maj-General Giffard which recaptured the houses. These were then burnt to prevent them being re-occupied. Both sides settled into their positions, and exchanged musket fire for the rest of the day.

The planned second prong of Newcastle's attack, under Newport's command, never arrived. The historian David Cooke suggests that it was most likely due to his artillery slowing him down on the poor winter roads. The 18th-century historian Francis Drake claimed that one of the Parliamentarian officers, Captain John Hotham, forged a letter to Newport, purporting to be from Newcastle, ordering him to halt.

With the onset of darkness, Newcastle withdrew his men. They bivouacked in the fields nearby with the intention of resuming the attack the next morning. The battle had lasted from 11 in the morning to 5 in the afternoon and an estimated 40,000 musket balls had been fired.

The Parliamentarians, despite holding a defensible position, were running short of gunpowder, and decided to withdraw from the town overnight. They split their force; Fairfax took his men to Selby, and Hotham to Cawood.

=== Casualties ===
In a letter to parliament, Lord Fairfax gave his assessment of the casualties suffered by both sides. He puts his own casualties at seven dead and about 20 wounded with no prisoners lost. He is less certain of the exact numbers of the Royalist casualties but reports that the country people said there were at least 100 found killed and burned. In addition, he says his forces took seventeen prisoners.

== Aftermath ==
After the town had been vacated by the Parliamentarians, Newcastle advanced his forces into it on the morning of 8 December, subsequently garrisoning Pontefract Castle and a number of other towns in the area, cutting Fairfax off from the West Riding of Yorkshire. He sent Sir William Savile with a detachment of 2,000 men to secure the West Riding towns of Leeds, Wakefield and Bradford. Savile took Leeds and Wakefield without a fight, but had to split off a portion of his force to attempt to capture Bradford on 18 December, where he was repelled.
