= Manfield =

Village and civil parish in North Yorkshire, England

Coordinates: 54°30′57″N 1°39′39″W

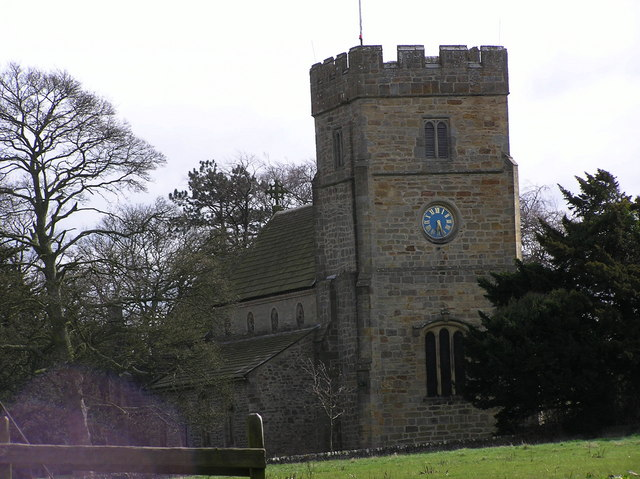
- All Saints Church, Manfield

- Location within North Yorkshire
- Population: 279 (including Cliffe 2011)
- Unitary authority: North Yorkshire
- Ceremonial county: North Yorkshire
- Region: Yorkshire and the Humber
- Country: England
- Sovereign state: United Kingdom
- Post town: DARLINGTON
- Postcode district: DL2
- Police: North Yorkshire
- Fire: North Yorkshire
- Ambulance: Yorkshire
- UK Parliament: Richmond and Northallerton

Manfield is a village and civil parish in the county of North Yorkshire, England. It is a parish in the wapentake of Gilling East. From 1974 to 2023 it was part of the district of Richmondshire, it is now administered by the unitary North Yorkshire Council.

The closest major town is Darlington, which is 3.5 miles (5.6 km) east of Manfield. It is close to the River Tees and Darlington and is notable for All Saints Church and Manfield Village School.

== History ==
The first part of Manfield is the British or Celtic word 'Maen', meaning a stone or pile of stones. In Saxons times, this word signified the open country. Manfield was once an oppidium characterised by fields, small hills and barrows. The parish includes the township of Cliffe, a hamlet situated on the River Tees. Cliffe had a population of 53 in the early 1820s. Manfield covers 3,455 acres of land, grounding 74 houses. The Catholic chapel run by Reverend William Hogarth.

== Population ==
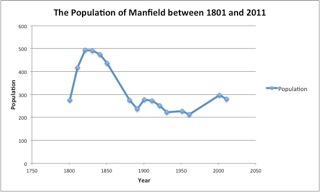
Data from historical and modern data census

The population of Manfield has very much fluctuated over time. With the population in 1801 reported to be 275, this grew dramatically, almost doubling to 493 in 1821. This was due to a falling death rate, whilst birth rates remained the same. The famine in 1845 caused the UK's population as a whole to decrease, and such effects were seen in Manfield. In 1841, its population fell from 474 to 276 in 1881. Over the past 150 years, the population has clearly aged. However, mortality decline in the late 19th century was mainly due to the reduction of very high infant mortality rates. In 2001, the population was 297, 21.5% of this being economically active. The majority of the population here was aged between 30 and 59 years old. The population fell to 279 according to the 2011 census, however the percentage of economically active persons rose to 26.4%.

== Occupational structure ==
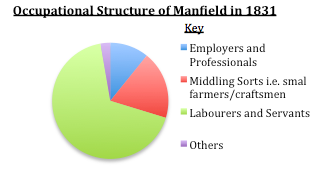
Pie-chart showing the occupational structure for Manfield in 1831

In the 1820s, there was a farm house called Clowbeck in the parish. In 1831, 28 people worked on this farm. There were 16 professionals in the village and 100 people who worked as labourers and servants, most likely for the manor in Manfield, the Lord of which was R. B. Wilson. In 1881, 17% of the male population worked in agriculture, whilst the majority of women (37%) worked in 'unknown sectors', working in environments varying from manufacturing to services. Men worked in the hard labour sectors, whilst women worked in the more domestic industries. At this time there were only two professionals in the village, one male and one female.

== Amenities ==
=== All Saints Church ===
All Saints' Church, Manfield dates back to Saxon times. It is a vicarage located in the eastern end of Manfield. It is dedicated to All Saints, in the deanery of Richmond, diocese of Chester. Built in the 12th century, the ancient stone structure is made from sandstone, ashlar and rubble stone. Its square tower was built in the 16th century, contains a clock and three bells. Among the stained glass windows there is one representing the Raising of Jairus' Daughter by Meyer. More recently, windows of the Church have been replaced with other designs. The first marriage in this church was in 1848.

=== Manfield Village School ===
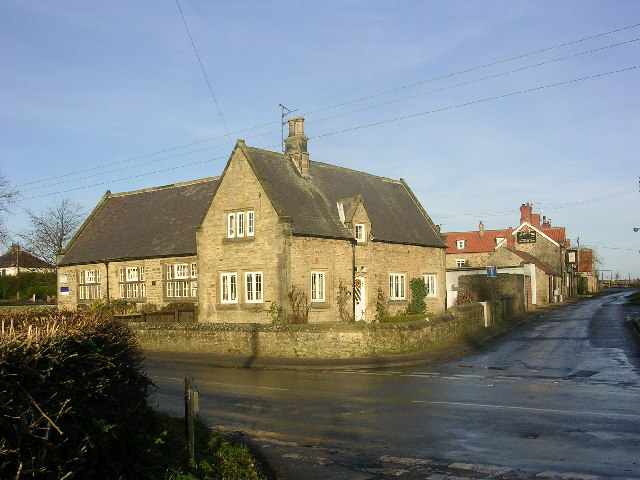
Manfield's village school, the Crown pub to the right

The Church of England village school was built in 1857, costing £800. and had a fee of £10 per annum. It is run by volunteer workers, who teach the 11 pupils that attend here, aged 4 to 11. The school has an annual fee of £30. The school was originally built with the genuine belief in the value of education and the diminishing need for child labour in Victorian industries and farming. Those children who passed the Eleven Plus went to Richmond Girls High School or Boys' Grammar School or to the Richmond Secondary Modern. Beside the school there is small reading room and a library where residents can reside.

== See also ==
- Listed buildings in Manfield
