= Concangis =

Roman fort in Co. Durham, England

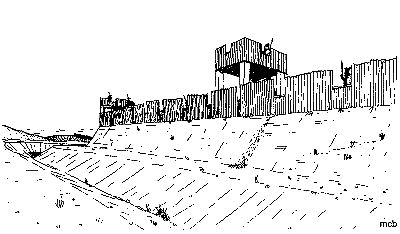
- What the early defences at Concangis may have looked like

- Location within County Durham
- 54.85659°N 1.572263°W
- Location: County Durham, England

Concangis was an auxiliary castra in the Roman province of Lower Britain (Britannia Inferior). Its ruins are located in Chester-le-Street, County Durham, in England, and are now known as Chester-le-Street Roman Fort. It is situated 6 miles (10 km) north of the city of Durham and 8 miles (13 km) south of Newcastle upon Tyne.

== Name ==
The name Concangis is Brittonic but of uncertain meaning; it is possibly derived from a root *concos/*cancos meaning ‘horse’.

== History ==
The Roman fort of Concangis is located east of the forts of Longovicium (Lanchester) and Vindomora (Ebchester) and 8 miles (13 km) south of Pons Aelius (Newcastle upon Tyne). It is east of the main Roman road of Dere Street, which connected other forts near Hadrian's Wall and beyond to Eboracum (York), and is close to Cade's Road, which is thought to have run from Eboracum to Pons Aelius. It is also speculated that Concangis may have been linked to Dere Street via a branch road heading west connecting to Longovicium (on Dere Street), but this has yet to be confirmed. The discovery by Raymond Selkirk of an abutment on the Cong Burn suggests that a bridge had been built there and had connected this fort with the one at Vindomora (Ebchester) to the west.

Concangis is listed on both the 4th/5th-century Notitia Dignitatum and the 7th-century Ravenna Cosmography.

The fort is on a high bluff, overlooking the valleys of the Wear to the east and the Cong Burn to the north, hence the fort is in the sort of position frequently favoured by Roman military surveyors. The road north to Pons Aelius passed west of the fort and made monitoring traffic easy. The fort covered roughly six and a half acres and was built first in turf and timber probably in the 70s AD by the Legio IX Hispana (Ninth Hispanic Legion) and later in stone by the Legio II Augusta (the Second Augustan Legion), probably during the early 2nd century, coinciding with the construction of Hadrian's Wall, which was also built in part by Legio II.

Excavations were carried out in 1978 and in 1990/1991. Unfortunately much of the fort is beneath the town of Chester-le-Street so little remains to be seen except for a portion of the excavated officers’ quarters left on display. Finds included pottery, fine table wares, coins, animal bones, a cheese press and curiously even a tile with a dog's footprint on it. Altars found range from ones dedicated to the war god Mars and the sun god Apollo to ones to Celtic and German gods such as Digenis and Vitiris. The large (3 out of 8) number of altars dedicated to patron deities concerned with the wellbeing of veteran soldiers would seem to suggest the inhabitants of Concangis included a high proportion of ex-military men. Two large stones in a buttress of the parish church of St Mary and St Cuthbert have lewis holes for lifting, which strongly suggest they were recycled from the Roman fort.

== Garrison ==
A construction inscription attests the Legio II Augusta as having built/rebuilt the fort, but as is usual this gives no evidence of who occupied it since Legionaries built only the fortifications and it was the Auxilia who garrisoned it. An incomplete inscription mentions an Alae Antoninae (Antonine Wing), possibly on routine patrols and on restoration work on an aqueduct and latrines. The poor state of the inscription makes it impossible to identify the unit accurately, but based on finds nearby and units with similar names it can be deduced the unit present was the Ala Secundae Asturum Antoniniana (Second Wing of Antonine Asturians). This unit was present for emperor Septimius Severus's campaigns in Caledonia and was also present at other forts such as Lindum (Lincoln) and Cilurnum.

A tile with the initials NV seems to suggest the Numeri Vigilum was present here during the 4th century AD. It was also listed as Praefectus Numeri Vigilum Concangios (The Prefect of the Company of Watchmen from Concangis) under the Duke of the Britains.

== Gallery ==
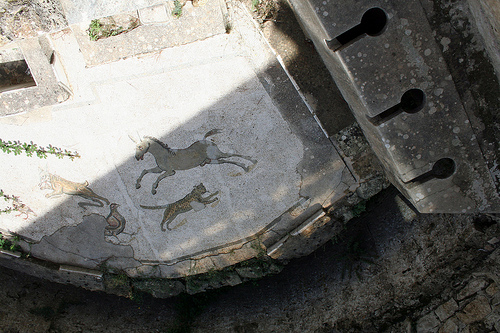
View of a latrine – this is not in Chester-le-Street, doing an image search shows it is in Piazza Armerina in Sicily

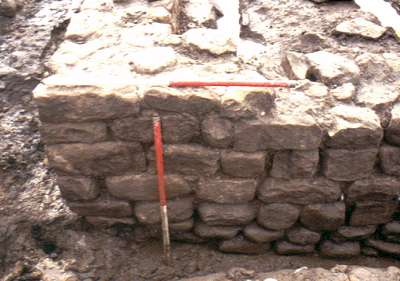
Stone remains of north wall

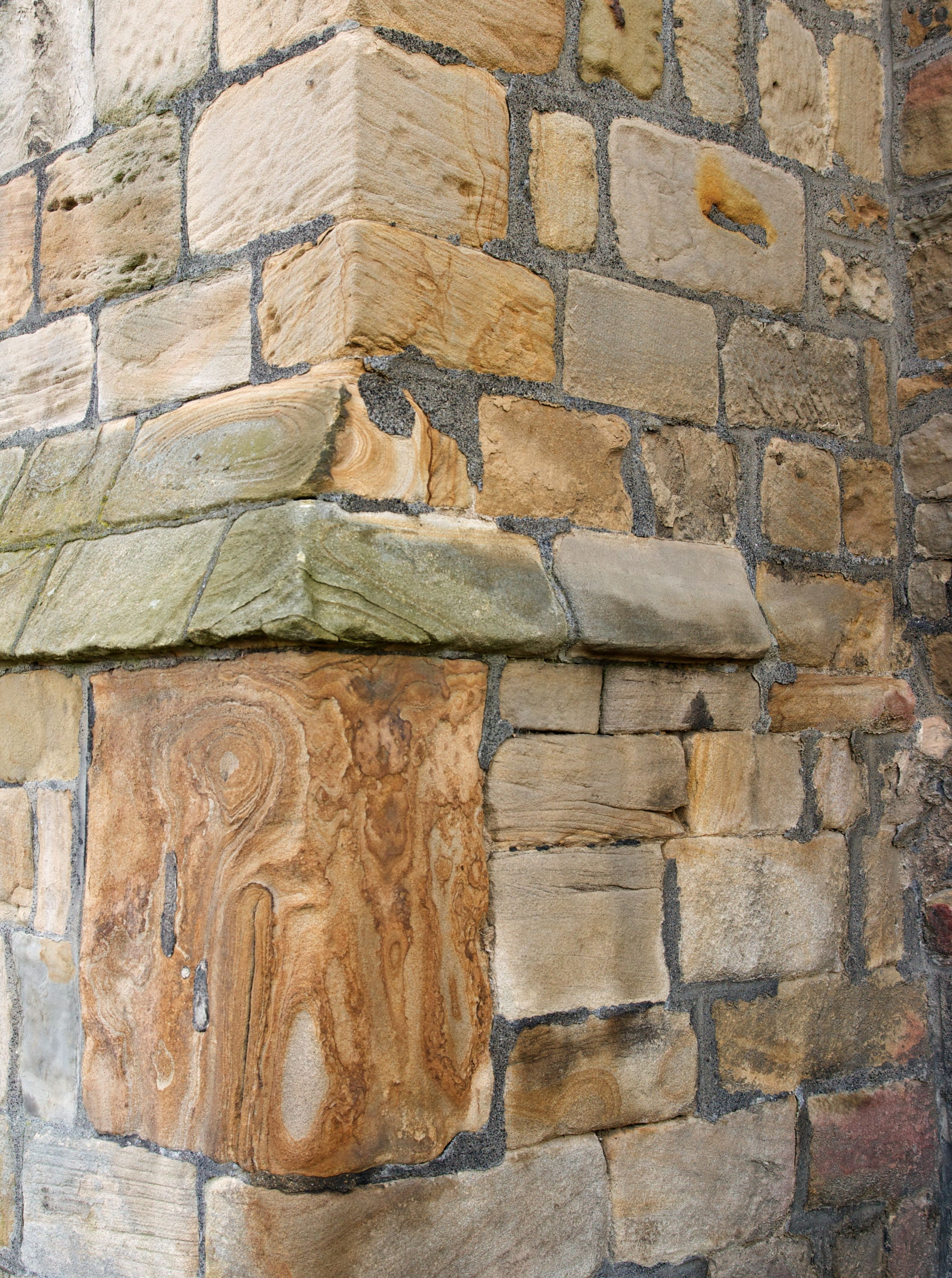
Re-used Roman stones with lewis holes – central lifting slots below left and above right, now filled with mortar

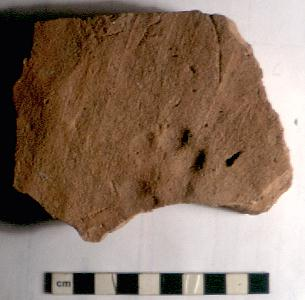
Tile with a dog's paw-print on it

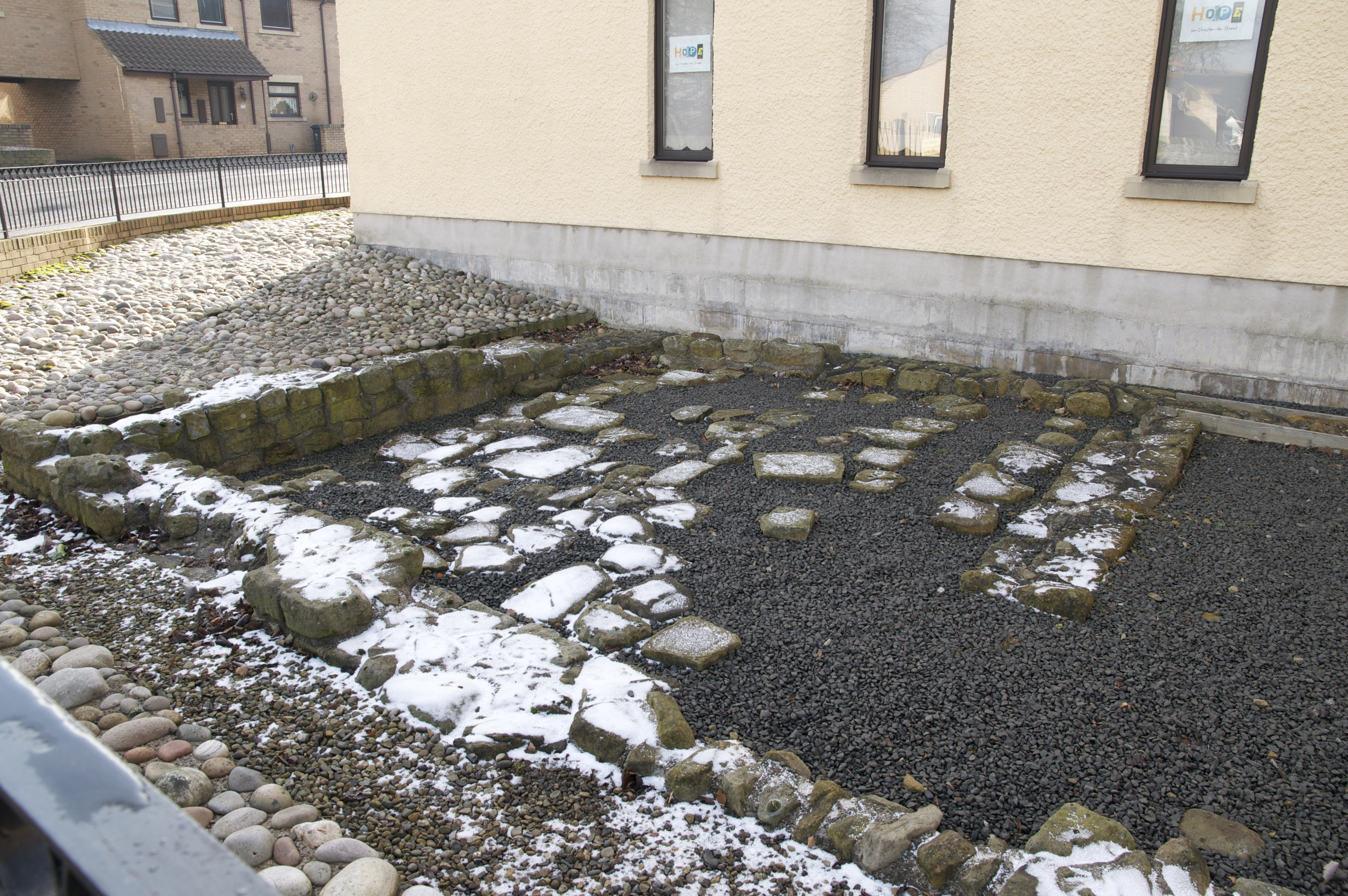
Officers' quarters reconstruction

== See also ==
- Roman engineering
- Roman military engineering
- Roman sites in the United Kingdom
