= Longovicium =

Auxiliary Roman fort in Durham county

- Lanchester Roman Fort
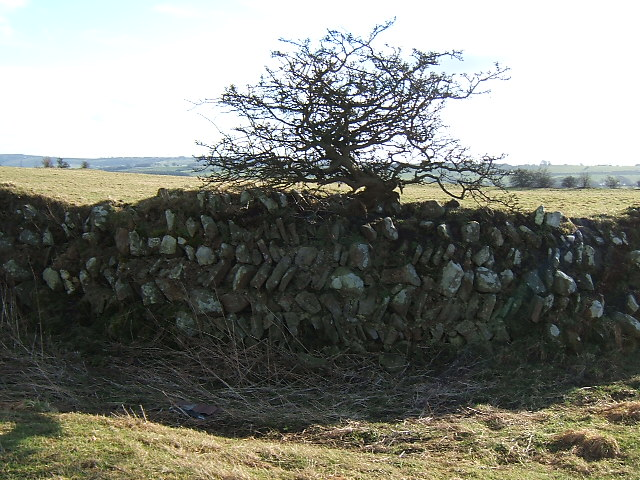
- Roman walls of Longovicium

- Location within County Durham
- 54.816°N 1.755°W
- Location: Lanchester, Durham, County Durham, England

History
- Founded: c. 150 AD
- Abandoned: c. 5th century AD

Longovicium (or Lanchester Roman Fort) was an auxiliary fort located on Roman Dere Street, in the Roman province of Britannia Inferior. It is located just southwest of Lanchester (grid reference NZ159469) in the English county of Durham, roughly 8 miles (13 km) to the west of the city of Durham and 5 miles (8 km) from Consett.

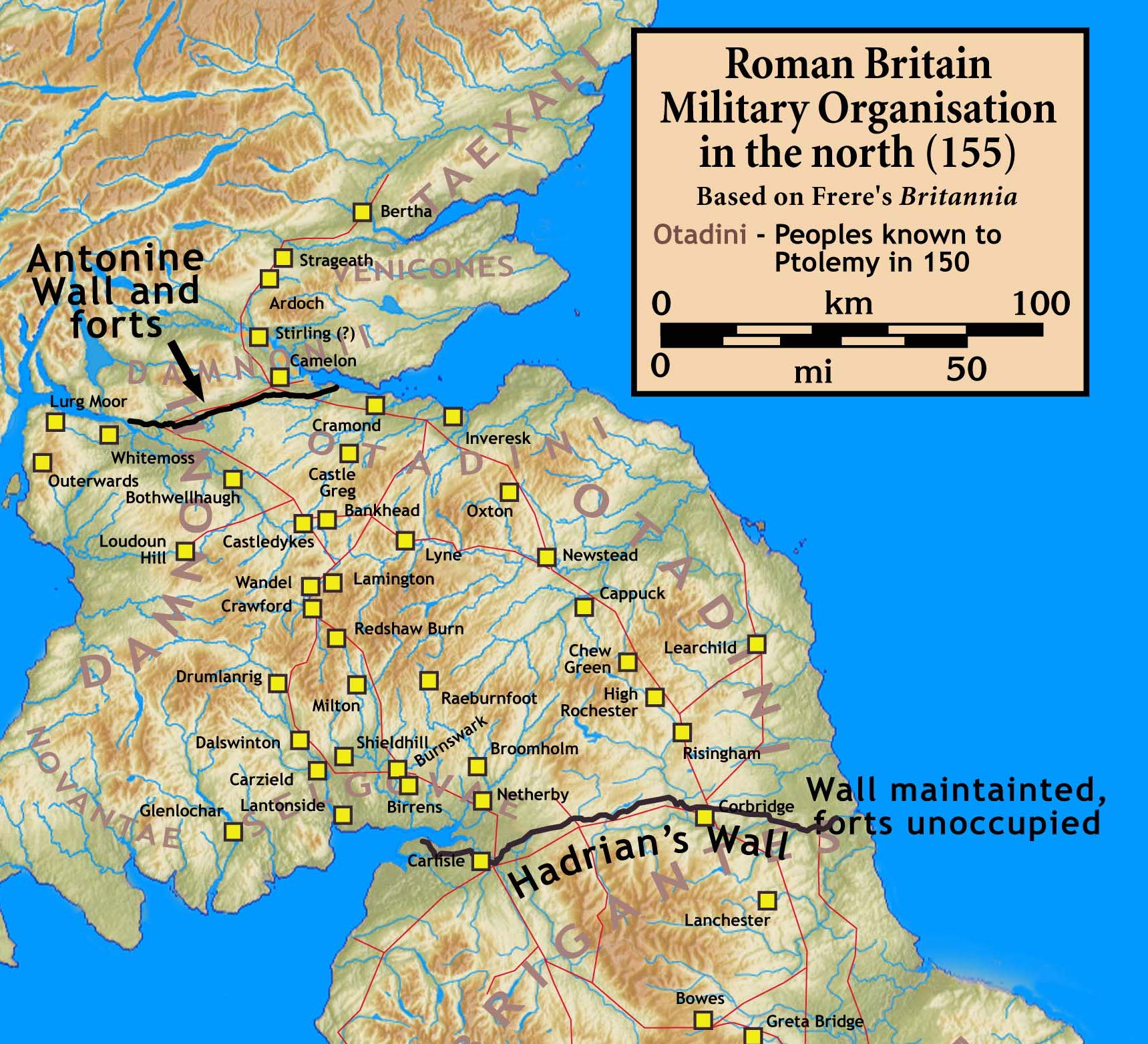
Roman north Britain 155 AD

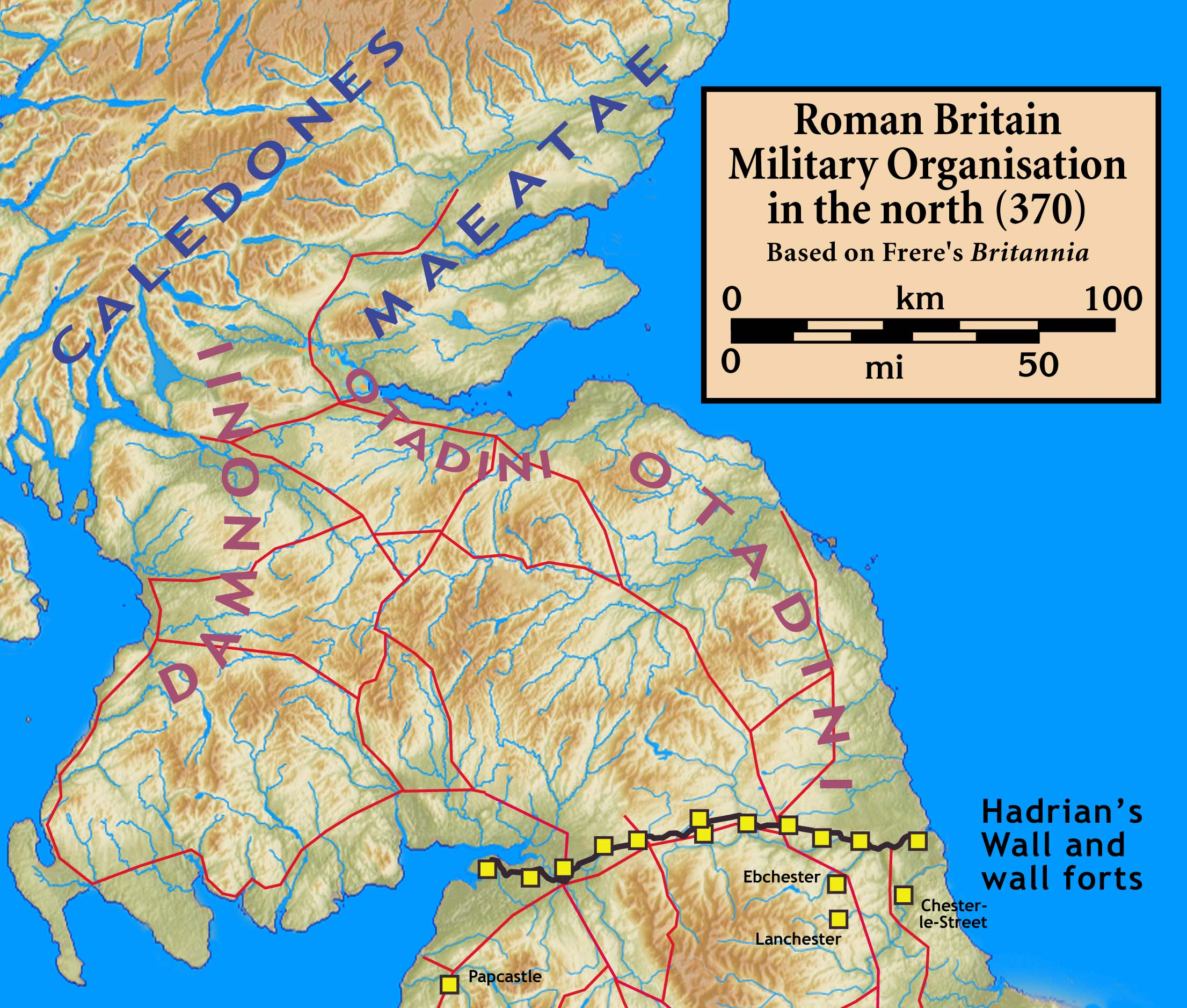
Roman north Britain 370 AD

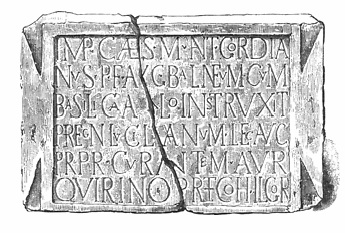
Building dedication (bath) to Emperor Gordian III from Cohors I Lingonum found in Lanchester

== Etymology ==
The name Longovicium is of Brittonic origin. The first element is *longo- meaning "ship" (cf. Welsh llong). The second element may be wīg broadly meaning "settlement" (Welsh gwig; compare Wigan), or else *uic-, "warrior/fighter". Longovicum may represent an adaption of a tribal name, Longovices.

Lanchester fort is a good fit to the Ravenna Cosmography name Lincovigla, with a natural meaning close to 'hillside watcher'. Longovicium in the Notitia Dignitatum is easier to explain in coastal Cumbria than in inland Yorkshire and the argument that that name was constructed in a language close to Welsh is weak.

== History ==
The fort was situated between Vindomora (Ebchester), and Vinovia (Binchester) on Dere Street, the main Roman road linking Eboracum (York) with Hadrian's Wall. It is about 20 miles (32 km) south of the wall, and was built on high ground with clear views around the site. Some archaeologists have postulated that a road may have existed connecting the fort at Longovicium to the one at Concangis (modern-day Chester-le-Street), but this has yet to be proven.

A construction slab identifies the Legio XX Valeria Victrix (Twentieth Legion) as having built the fort, but this gives no real clue as to when the fort was built. In 88 AD, the Emperor Domitian had ordered the Legio XX abandon the fort they had been building in Scotland at Inchtuthil and redeploy to garrison the legionary fortress Deva Victrix (Chester). But the fort is estimated to have been built later than the other forts on Dere Street, around 150 AD. There is evidence it was rebuilt around 230/240 AD and again in the early 4th century.

The fort is listed both in the Notitia Dignitatum and in the Ravenna Cosmography.

The rectangular fort, which had rounded not square corners, had four gates and was surrounded by a ditch. Despite never having systematically excavated, archaeologists have found the remains of the headquarters buildings, a bathhouse and some barracks buildings through the use of geophysical survey. Remains of a nearby vicus have been found, and its traces can be seen through aerial photography. A cemetery was also discovered in the 20th century to the southwest of the fort, with examples of stone-lined burials and cremations sites. The fact that the fort is located on fields that have not been ploughed means its condition is remarkable, although stone robbing has taken its toll. A column, probably from the colonnade of the Commandant's House, can be found in the nearby All Saints' Parish Church, as can an altar dedicated to the goddess Garmangabis.

Professor Andrew Breeze, of the University of Navarra, has argued that the Battle of Brunanburh took place at Longovicium. He interprets Brunanburh as meaning 'stronghold of the Browney', the river which passes the fort.

== Aqueducts and reservoirs ==
Longovicium is also interesting in having had a copious water supply from two aqueducts, one of which was fed from an impounded source to the west. The dam harnessed the water of 21 springs and was 20 feet (6 m) high and 110 yards (100 m) in length, being stone faced and clay lined on the inside. Despite not being on the scale of those supplying cities, the Longovicium aqueduct was nevertheless a significant feat of engineering, being considered one of the best preserved aqueducts in Britain. There is also a receiving reservoir near the fort itself. The Dolaucothi gold mines had a larger number of aqueducts, and numerous reservoirs, which are also very well preserved. The water supply at Dolaucothi was used for hydraulic mining and hushing gold deposits, while that at Longovicium is currently unknown.

== Industry ==
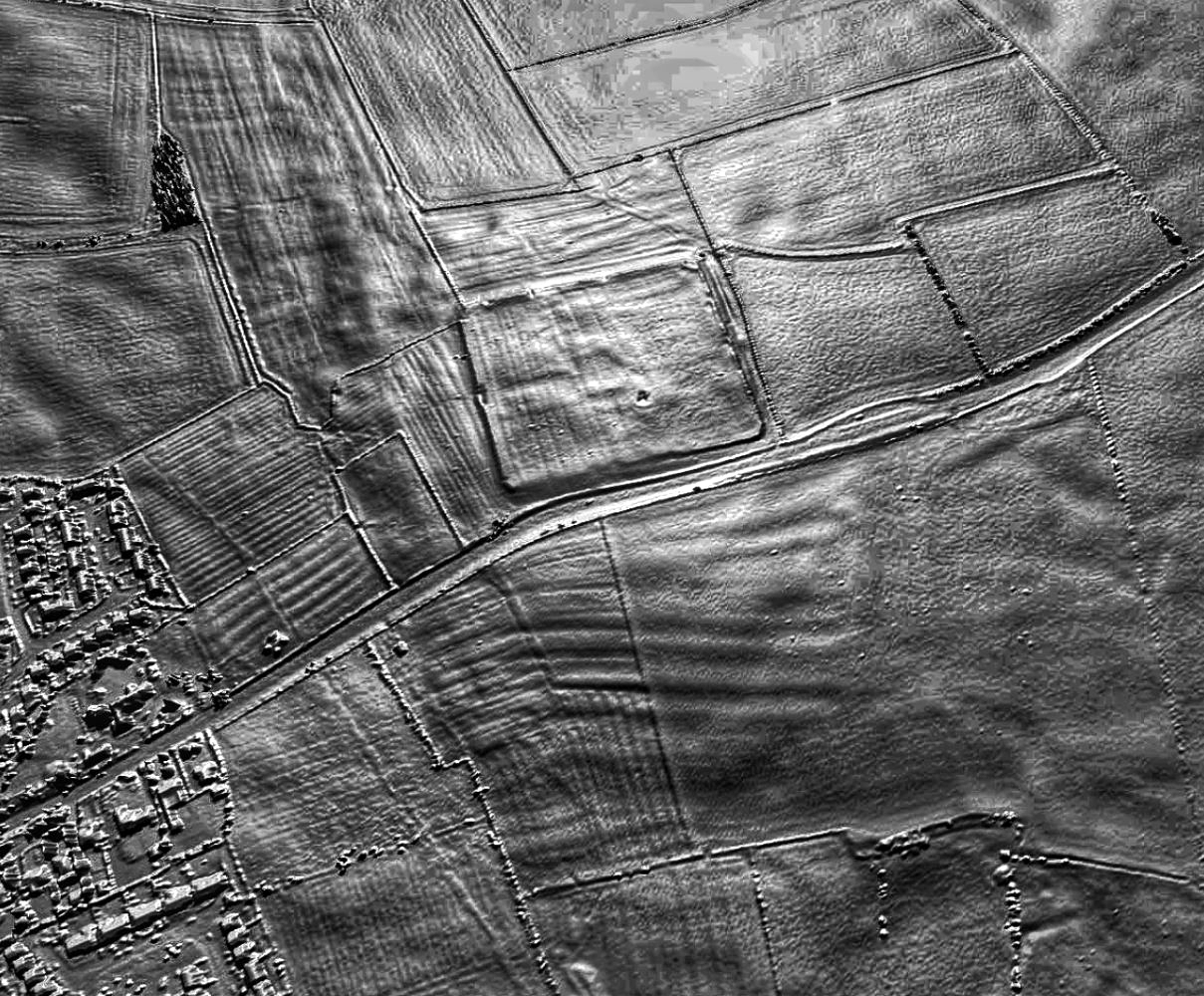
A lidar view of Lanchester Roman fort, Longovicium, and vicus.

The above-average usage of water might be attributed to the demands of the baths, latrines and the possible Armamentarium, although industrial usage is more likely, since all forts would have baths and latrines. Large-scale smithing or smelting is assumed to have been carried out within the fort or the associated vicus judging by the large quantities of slag and cinders found at the site. This would seem to support the thesis that this particular fort was home to an Armamentarium, or arms store, where weaponry was fabricated and stored. This would supply not only Longovicium but other nearby forts. However, the site is almost unique in Britain for the size of its water supply, and the remains imply large-scale iron smelting, perhaps assisted by watermills for forging iron products.

Much of what is known about the site is due to the large number of altars, dedication slabs and a milestone dedicated to emperor Gordian III found 1/2 mile (800 m) away from the fort on the path of Dere Street. Gods worshipped include traditional Roman deities such as Jupiter, Mars, Mercury and Silvanus and Celtic and Germanic ones such as Garmangabis. From such stones and building inscriptions it is known who built the fort and eventually garrisoned it.

== Garrison ==
During the first century AD, two stones (an altar and an inscription) attest that the Cohors Primae Fida Vardulorum Milliaria Equitata Civium Romanorum (The First Cohort of Faithful Varduli, one-thousand strong, part-mounted, citizens of Rome) were present at Longovicium. This unit of Varduli had its origins in Hispania Tarraconensis, Gipuzkoa, in northern Spain, where the unit was raised. This unit was also present at other forts in the Britannia Superior, such as Castlecary on the Antonine Wall, Bremenium (High Rochester), Corstopitum (Corbridge) and milecastle 19 on Hadrian's Wall. The Tarraconensis region of Spain was the most important source of gold, tin, copper and other metals and minerals in the entire Roman Empire, and the Romans applied water power on a large scale for hydraulic mining using aqueducts to tap the local rivers. The remains of their mining efforts can be seen today at Las Médulas, for example. It may not be coincidental that Lanchester possesses so many aqueducts and reservoirs, although they must have been adapted for some other purpose.

Two more stone inscriptions, dated AD 238 and 244, attest to the Cohors Primae Lingonum's (First Cohort of Lingones) and the Cohors Primae Lingonum Gordiana equitata's (First Cohort of Lingones, Gordian's own, part mounted) presence. The Lingones inhabited the Plateau de Langres in the Bourgogne region of France, near Dijon. There was also a detachment of Suebians (or Suevi) from Lusitania present at this time.

The fourth century saw the fort garrisoned by a native unit of Longovicians, an irregular part-mounted auxiliary unit.

== Future projects ==
The Friends of Longovicium society, Durham County Council, Durham University and Newcastle University have been working together with the owner of the lands on which the fort is situated to eventually open the area to the public, turning it into a tourist attraction. Possible excavations are also envisaged. The project currently needs a couple of million pounds, funds which the County Council is pursuing through English Heritage.

== See also ==
- Dolaucothi Gold Mines
- Roman aqueducts
- Roman engineering
- Roman military engineering
- Dere Street
- Castra
- Roman sites in the United Kingdom
