= Cataractonium =

Roman site in North Yorkshire, England

- Caturactonium; Cactabactonion
- Location within England
- 54°23′3″N 01°38′59″W
- Type: Fortification and settlement
- Periods: Roman Imperial
- Location: Catterick, North Yorkshire, England
- Region: Brittania

History
- Built: 71
- Built by: Quintus Petillius Cerialis

Site notes
- Length: 135 m (443 ft)
- Width: 135 m (443 ft)
- Area: 1.8 ha (4.4 acres)

Cataractonium was a fort and settlement in Roman Britain. The settlement evolved into Catterick, located in North Yorkshire, England.

== Name ==
Cataractonium is likely to have taken its name from the Latin word cataracta (ultimately derived from Greek cataràcta, καταρράκτης), meaning either "waterfall" or "portcullis". Some linguists have suggested that this was a misinterpretation of an original Brittonic placename meaning "[place of] battle ramparts". The name is attested as Cataractonium in two 2nd-century Vindolanda tablets. (Note: Vindolanda tablets #185 and #343.) The British section of the 2nd-century Antonine Itinerary mentions Catterick three times, but declines it variously as Cataractoni and Cataractone, implying the scribe considered it a 3rd-declension name. It is spelled Caturactonium (Ancient Greek: Κατουρακτόνιον, Katouraktónion) in Ptolemy's Geography and misspelled Cactabactonion in the Ravenna Cosmography. The name was spelled Cetrecht, Cetrehtan, and Cetrettun by Bede in the 7th century and Catrice in the Domesday Book compiled around 1086.

== Origins ==
There is considerable evidence for pre-Roman activity in the environs of the eventual Roman settlement. Evidence on both sides of the Swale suggests both Bronze Age and Iron Age activity. The Bronze Age remains take the form of a chambered cairn some 500 m south-east of Cataractonium, a ceramic vessel 200 m north and a bronze rapier 150 m north-east. The cairn has associated domestic occupation which continues into the Iron Age in the form of a multi-period roundhouse.

Though there is no definitive date for the building of the fort, it is likely to have been around AD 70 during the governorship of Q. Petillius Cerialis to support the campaign of Agricola in Scotland. It is also likely to have been in use during the Brigantes revolt in 155 under the governorship of Gn. Julius Verus. The first site appeared to be little more than a timber hill fort, but the later and bigger settlement was constructed in stone and had a civilian population too.

== Military ==
No direct evidence exists of which military units may have been stationed at the fort, but it is likely that an auxiliary unit from Bremetenacum Veteranorum (Ribchester) would have been posted here. Tiles found nearby were stamped "BSAR". This would suggest that over the years of occupation, soldiers from the Ala II Asturum, Numerus Equitatum Sarmatarum and Cuneus Sarmatarum units were used as detachments for the fort.

== Culture ==
Among the artifacts excavated at the site was a theatrical mask, suggesting there may have been a theatre or small amphitheatre.

In one of the large cemetery groups, a unique group of 'fist-and-phallus' pendants, dating to AD 160–200 were discovered in the grave of an infant.

== Economy ==
A 1995 project that mapped the site from the air, located at least sixteen identifiable buildings and the partial remains of several others. These were likely to have been shops.

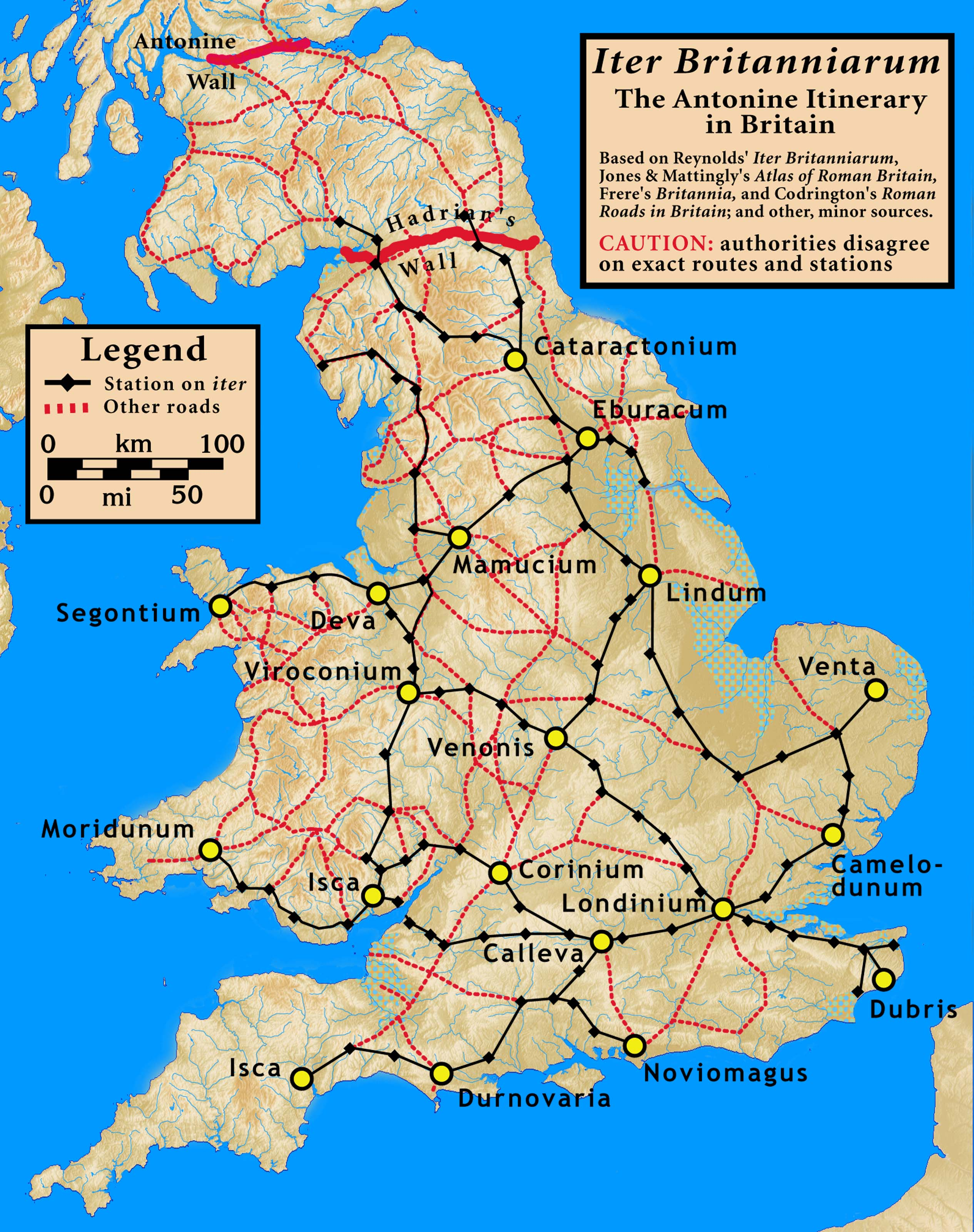
A map of the Roman roads in Britain

=== Roads ===
Cataractonium was a crossroads where the road north from Eboracum (York) (Note: Given by the Antonine Itinerary as 41 Roman miles distant.) and Isurium (Aldborough) (Note: Given by the Antonine Itinerary as 24—Roman miles distant.) split into Dere Street running 12 Roman miles northeast to Vinovium (Binchester) and the Roman equivalent of Watling Street running 16 or 18 Roman miles northwest to Lavatrae (Bowes). These roads communicated with and supplied Hadrian's and the Antonine Wall.

=== Rivers ===
The fort was located to the south of the River Swale. The early fort was used as a marching camp for patrols in the area and as defence for the trunk road's bridgehead.

== Archaeological research ==
Little can be seen above ground as most of the area is now covered by Catterick Racecourse and the A1(M) road. The most visible is a section of wall. There was evidence of at least four altars of worship. They were dedicated respectively to

- Veterus, an ancient German ancestral god,
- Suria, another name for Ceres,
- Matribus Domesticae, to the mother goddesses of the house (dative plural)
- an unnamed god of "roads and pathways".

The 1995 aerial study of the area around Catterick identified several possible remains in and around the site of the Roman fort. On the north banks of the river are crop marks running parallel to the course of Dere Street that could be a wall. The same survey also confirmed the existence of a temporary fort about a quarter of a mile east of the main camp. The north and east walls have been identified, but the west part of the camp now lies under the nearby racecourse. The north wall is about 540 feet (160 m) in length with a gate and traverse, whilst the east wall is about 850 feet (260 m) long. The walls are connected by a curved structure. Some of the early excavations unearthed two carved stone lions, an aureus of Nero, two cruciform gilt Saxon fibulae and a very large bronze urn. The buildings that have been uncovered range from the second century to the third. There is evidence that the entire layout of the camp was altered in the fourth century.

An excavation by Sir William Lawson around 1840 revealed the foundations to the walls of the fort.

Excavations in 2014–2016, as part of a scheme of improvements on the A1 road, have recorded thousands of additional artifacts from the Roman town.

== See also ==
- Roman Britain
- Dere Street
- Isurium Brigantum
- Eboracum
- Morbium
