= Lanchester, County Durham =

Village and civil parish in County Durham, England

Coordinates: 54°49′19″N 1°44′38″W

Lanchester
- Village
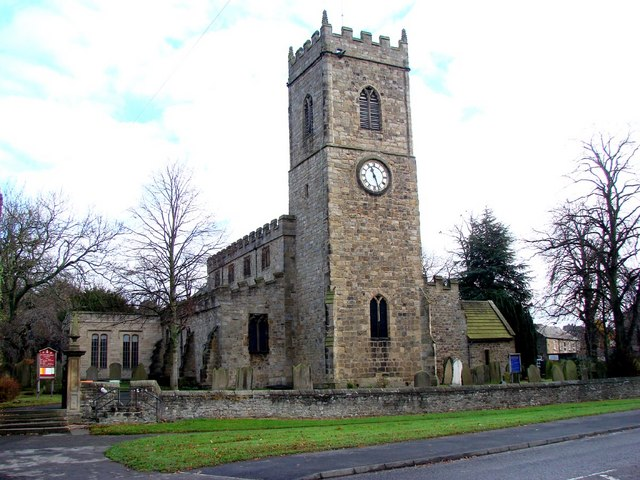
- All Saints’ Church, Lanchester

- Location within County Durham
- Population: 4,054 (2011)
- OS grid reference: NZ165475
- Unitary authority: County Durham
- Ceremonial county: Durham
- Region: North East
- Country: England
- Sovereign state: United Kingdom
- Post town: DURHAM
- Postcode district: DH7
- Dialling code: 01207
- Police: Durham
- Fire: County Durham and Darlington
- Ambulance: North East
- UK Parliament: North Durham

Lanchester is a village and civil parish in County Durham, England, 8 miles (13 km) west of Durham and 5 miles (8 km) from Consett. It had a population at the 2011 Census of 4,054.

Although there was a small drift mine on the edge of the village which closed in the 1970s, Lanchester's economy was mainly based on agriculture. It is now a residential village in which a number of housing estates have been developed since the late 1960s.

== Etymology ==
Lanchester was first known by the name Longovicium in the 2nd century AD, which is derived from Common Brittonic longo- ("ship") + *wicā- ("a Roman vicus"). The Lan- part of the modern name is from Old English lang (> "long"), but that may simply have been a reinterpretation of the British Celtic-derived name by Germanic settlers. The second element is ceaster ("a fort; old Roman site").

== History ==
The earliest occupation on the site is the Roman auxiliary fort located just southwest of Lanchester (grid reference NZ159469. Longovicium lay on the Roman road leading north from Eboracum (York), known as Dere Street. It is situated between the forts of Vindomora (Ebchester) and Vinovia (Binchester). The fort dates to AD 140, covers almost 6 acres (2.4 ha), and housed around 1,000-foot soldiers and cavalry. The fort foundations are well preserved, but there has only been minor excavation work carried out in 1937.

Stone from the fort was used in the construction of All Saints' Church, which has a Roman altar in its porch. It is one of many altars found in or near the fort, and was found in 1893.

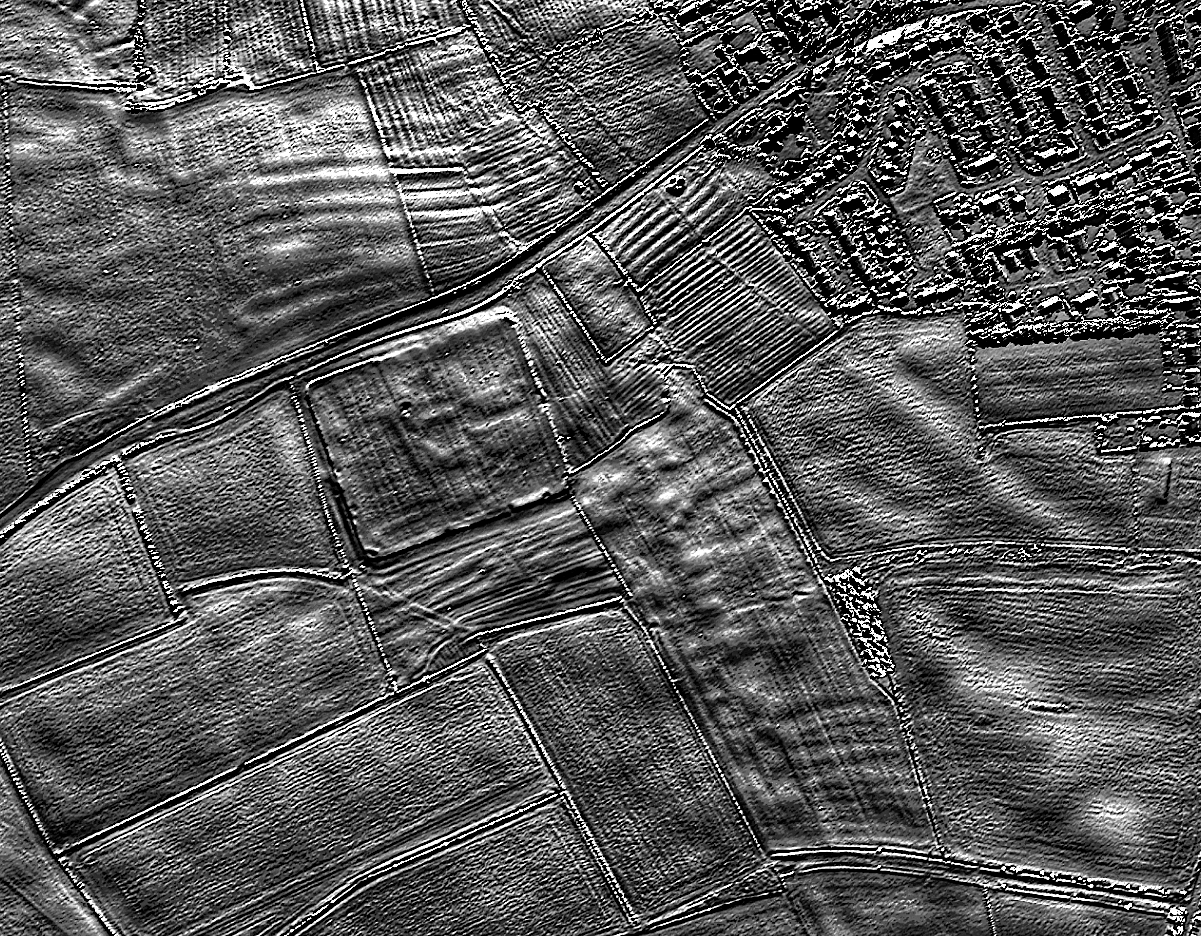
A lidar view of Lanchester's Roman fort.

Andrew Breeze has argued that the Battle of Brunanburh took place at the Roman fort of Longovicium. He interprets Brunanburh as meaning 'stronghold of the River Browney.'

== Governance ==
An electoral ward in the same name exists. The population of this ward taken at the 2011 Census was 7,446.

== Education ==
The schools at Lanchester include St Bede's Catholic School and Sixth Form College. There are also two primary schools: Lanchester All Saints' RC Primary School and Lanchester Endowed Parochial School. The latter has since moved about 50 yards (46 m) to new premises and the old school is now the village hall. The school has a nursery, an infants department and a juniors department.

== Religious sites ==
=== All Saints Parish church ===
The main Parish church is now known as All Saints but was once called St. Mary the Virgin. The original building dates from the mid 12th Century but was extended in 1284 by Antony Bek, the bishop of Durham. The tower dates from c.1430. Features of interest include the Norman chancel arch, the monolithic columns of the nave (presumably from the Lanchester Roman station) and a Roman altar in the porch.

=== College of Lanchester ===
The parish of Lanchester was originally very large, covering sixty-eight miles². To profit from this Anthony Bek created a Deanery and College of Canons at the church in 1284 and extended it to accommodate the increased numbers of clergy. The college consisted of a Dean and seven Prebendaries who each held a share in the church's revenues. Bek created a set of statutes and ordinances for the College which were confirmed by Edward I in 1293. The church supplemented its income by monopolising the sale of religious items such as holy water to the surrounding villages.

By the 15th century, the college was falling out of use and the church fell into a poor state of repair with "gaping ruins" in the church, Deanery and the canons' houses. By the time Henry VIII dissolved the monasteries the College and Deanery were abolished and the church returned to perpetual curacy.

=== St Margaret's chapel, Esp Green ===
To the north west of Lanchester was the site of a chapel at Esp Green dedicated to the Blessed Margaret. It is first mentioned in 1402–3 when it was held by Blanchland Abbey. After the dissolution of the abbey in 1539 the chapel fell into disuse and became a ruin. It was later used as a cattle shed and in 1750 work was carried out on the "chepple byre". Some of the stone was used to build the current farm house at Esp Green. The chapel is noted on the 1857 Ordnance survey map (NZ146491) just north of the "Lady Well".

=== Other churches ===
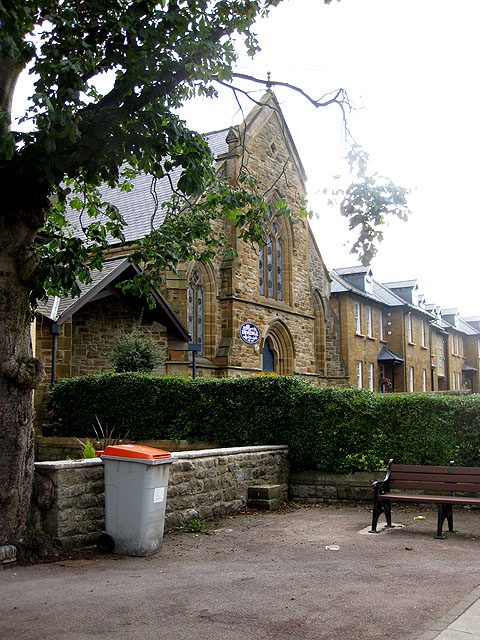
Methodist Church, Lanchester

The other churches within Lanchester are the All Saints' Catholic church and the Methodist Church which is centred in the heart of the village.

== Notable residents ==
- Lieutenant-General Sir John Clavering (bapt. 1722 – 30 August 1777), was Commander-in-Chief, India (1774-1777)
- Canon William Greenwell (1820–1918), archaeologist and inventor of the Greenwell's Glory fly-fishing fly.
- Dorothy (Dora) Greenwell (1821–82), poet, born at Greenwell Ford.
- Henry Nicholas Greenwell (1826–91), developer of Kona coffee
- George Hedley (1882–1937), professional footballer, born in Lanchester
- Steven Sproat (born 1960), ukulele player
- Peter Dunphy (born 1966), Film Producer
- Ginger Johnson, drag queen
- Anne McElvoy (born 1965), journalist
