= Vindomora =

Roman auxiliary fort in County Durham, England

- Ebchester Roman Fort
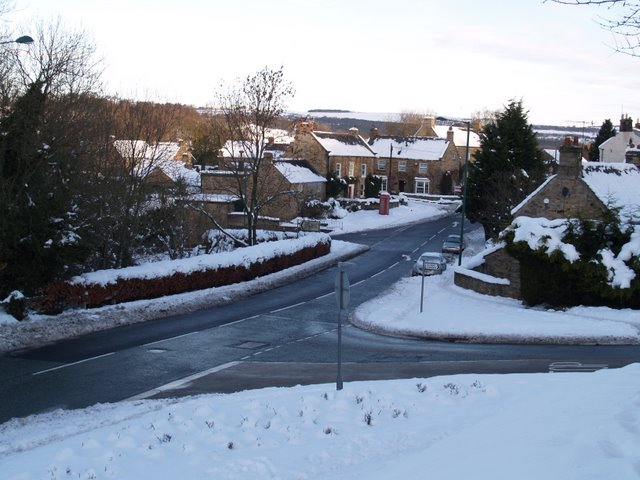
- Modern village of Ebchester, and approximate site of Vindomora

- Location within County Durham
- 54.8940°N 1.8385°W
- Location: Ebchester, County Durham, England

Vindomora was an auxiliary fort on Dere Street, in the province of Lower Britain (Britannia Inferior). Its ruins, now known as Ebchester Roman Fort, are situated at Ebchester (grid reference NZ103555) in the English county of Durham, to the north of Consett and 12 miles (19 km) west-south-west from Newcastle upon Tyne.

== History ==
Vindomora is situated in between the forts of Corstopitum (Corbridge) and Bywell to the north/west north, and Longovicium (Lanchester) to the south. It is located on Dere Street, the main Roman road linking Eboracum (York) with Hadrian's Wall and its surrounding areas. Its position also protected the river Derwent. It is about 13 miles (21 km) south of Hadrian's Wall, and was built at the foot of a long descent, sloping towards the north, scattered along the edge of a still deeper declivity, which overhangs the green low-lying meadow of the river valley of the Derwent.

The name Vindomora has been mistakenly understood to signify in Latin "The edge of the Black Moor", perhaps due to the resemblance of "-mora" to the Latin maura (black/dark), or End of the Hill; however, the name is clearly British, with the first part being the windo- (vindo-) "fair/white" found wherever Celts lived, with perhaps a variant of māra "great, big", also pan-Celtic. When the Romans had departed from the land, it received the name it now bears which is identical with "Upchester", and signifies "The Camp on the Height. The main road through Ebchester is appropriately named Vindomora road." The fort is only mentioned in the Antonine Itinerary.

Little remains to be seen of the fort as the town of Ebchester was built directly on top of the fort, unlike the successors of many other Roman towns, which are generally situated at a little distance from the ancient sites. In Ebchester Roman ramparts, altars and remains of all kinds are mingled in singular confusion with the gardens, cottages, roads and St. Ebba's Church. Immediately after the Roman departure, the area was reoccupied by woodland. Parts of the rampart are still visible near the post office, and some excavated ruins. Despite more recent construction on the site, a few legionary building stones and small altars have been recovered, enabling archaeologists to identify which units garrisoned the fort.

It is postulated there might be a road from Vindomora to Washing Wells Roman Fort (Whickham, Tyne and Wear), but this remains to be discovered. Also, recent discoveries at Bywell by Raymond Selkirk seem to suggest that Dere Street carried on to Bywell, and not to Corstopitum (Corbridge) as previously thought. Another road left to Whittonstall to the north-west and then possibly either to Corbridge (the path previously assumed to be Dere Street) or Hexham (which possibly contained a fort). Other finds at Cong Burn near Concangis (Chester-le-Street) to the east suggest these two forts were also linked by a road and bridge over the Cong Burn.

Gods worshipped included a typical mixture found at Auxiliary forts of classical Roman and Germanic/Celt Gods. Two altars name the ancient Germanic ancestor-god Vitiris, and one altar to a genius loci, a sort of presiding spirit in the local area. Roman war deities Mars and Minerva were also worshipped. A Vernostonus Cocidius was apparently a conflation of two Germanic war Gods.

== Garrison ==
Legionary stones recovered identify a Fifth Cohort as building the fort, but unfortunately give no clue as to the parent legion. This however cannot be taken as evidence of occupation because all Roman auxiliary forts were actually built by the highly trained legionaries, and not entrusted to the peregrine auxiliary soldiers who were to garrison the completed camp. The stones also identify the names of Centurions responsible for the construction work, and later restoration work done by auxiliary regiments at the time of the Scottish campaigns by emperor Severus.

The first unit proven to garrison Ebchester is the Cohors Quartae Breucorum Antoninianae (The Fourth Cohort of the Breuci: Antonine's Own), identified from an early 3rd century altar. They were a nominally 500-strong infantry regiment, although usually the number was around 460 or lower. This Auxilia unit was originally levied from amongst the Breuci tribe of Pannonia Inferior, natives of the Bosna valley in northeastern Bosnia-Herzegovina. This unit was also possibly present at Lavatris (Bowes, Durham), but the inscription is too damaged to read accurately.

== See also ==
- Roman engineering
- Roman military engineering
- Dere Street
- Roman sites in the United Kingdom
- Castra
