= Dere Street =

Roman road that ran from York in England to the Antonine Wall in Scotland

Coordinates: 55.0566°N 2.06543°W

- Roman Road
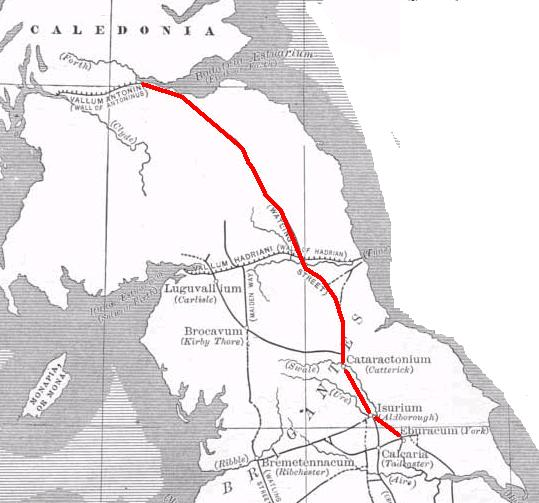
- Route of Dere Street

Route information
- Length: 226 mi (364 km) [146 mi or 235 km Eboracum to Trimontium; 80 mi or 129 km Trimontium to Veluniate]
- Time period: Roman Britain; Saxon Britain; Norman Britain
- Margary number: 8

Major junctions
- From: Eboracum
- Isurium, Cataractonium, Morbium, Vinovium, Longovicium, Vindomora, Coria, Onnum, Habitancum, Bremenium, Trimontium, Inveresk, Cramond
- To: Veluniate

Location
- Country: United Kingdom

Road network
- Roman roads in Britannia

Dere Street or Deere Street is a modern designation of a Roman road which ran north from Eboracum (York), crossing the Stanegate at Corbridge (Hadrian's Wall was crossed at the Portgate, just to the north) and continuing beyond into what is now Scotland, later at least as far as the Antonine Wall. It was the Romans' major route for communications and supplies to the north and to Scotland. Portions of its route are still followed by modern roads, including the A1(M) (south of the River Tees), the B6275 road through Piercebridge, where Dere Street crosses the River Tees, and the A68 north of Corbridge in Northumberland.

== Name ==
The Roman name for the route is lost. Its English name corresponds with the post-Roman Anglo-Saxon kingdom of Deira, through which the first part of its route lies. That kingdom possibly took its name from the Yorkshire River Derwent. The term "street" derives from its Old English sense (from Latin: via strata), which referred to any paved road and had no particular association with urban thoroughfares.

Portions of the road in Scotland were later known as St Cuthbert's Way and as the Royal Way (Medieval Latin: Via Regia).

=== "Watling Street" ===
The Antonine Itinerary's 2nd British route (called Watling Street) shared Dere Street's trunk road between Eboracum and Cataractonium (Catterick) before branching off to the northwest to communicate with Luguvalium (Carlisle). Owing to this, some stretches or the entirety of Dere Street is sometimes referenced as "Watling Street", a name that appears on the 1885-1900 edition of the Ordnance Survey map for the village of Oxnam.

A small section of the old A68 route north in Corbridge is called Watling Street. It should not, however, be confused with the traditional route between Canterbury and Wroxeter in the south nor with the Carlisle route to its west.

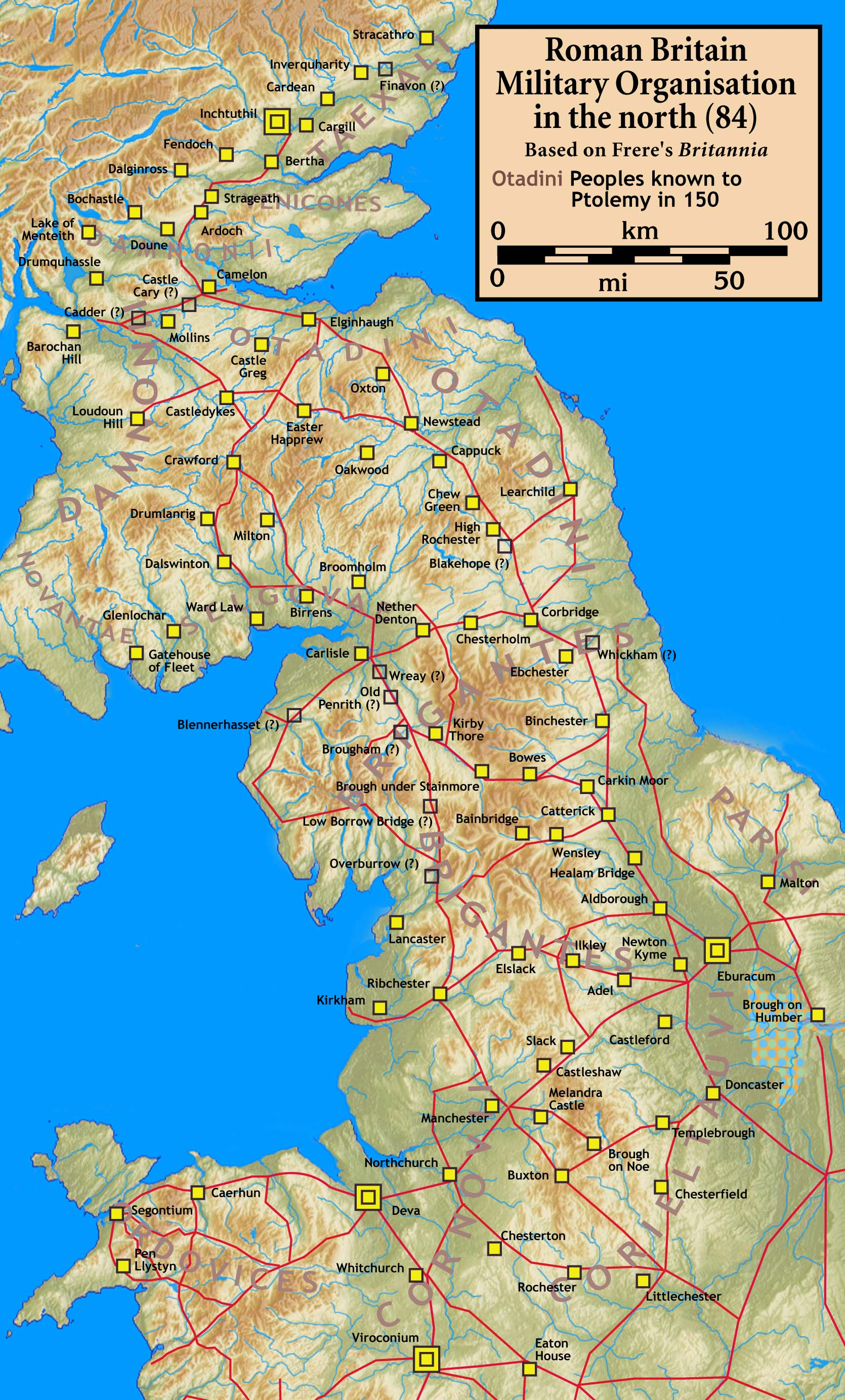
A map of the Roman north c. 84, including Dere Street between Eboracum and Veluniate near Camelon

== Roman route ==
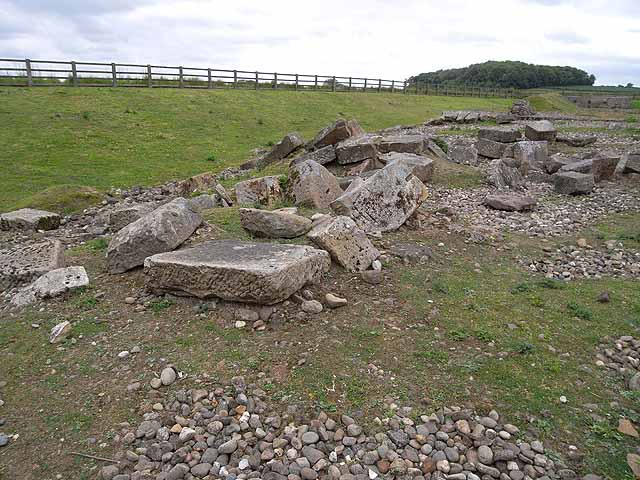
Piercebridge Roman Bridge, remains thought to represent the old Roman bridge over the Tees

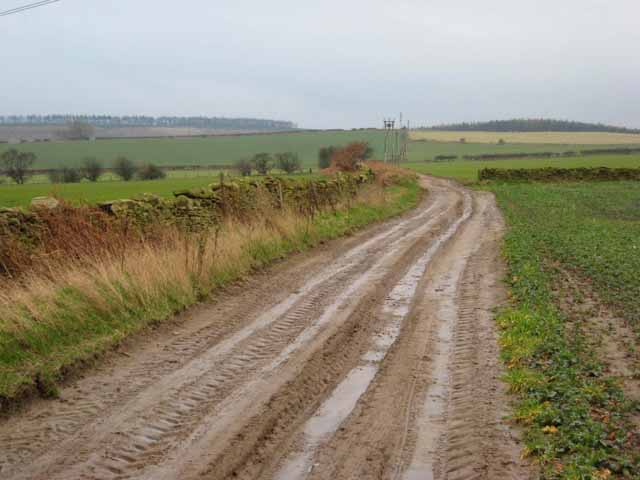
Dere Street at Esh Winning

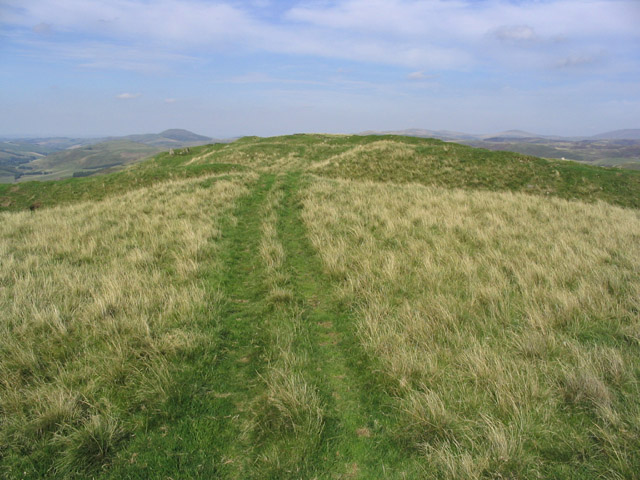
Iron Age hill fort associated with Dere Street at Pennymuir

Dere Street roughly corresponds to the Antonine Itinerary's 1st British route as far as Hadrian's Wall, although it began further south than York:

Route I of the Antonine Itinerary
From north of Hadrian's Wall to Praetorium:			156 Roman miles.
From Bremenium	[Rochester],	To Coria [Corbridge],	20
To Vindomora	[Ebchester],		9
To Vinovia	[Binchester],		19
To Cataractonium	[Catterick],		22
Isurium	[Aldborough],		24
Eboracum	[York],	6th Victorious Leg.,	17
To Derventio	[Malton],		7
To Delgovicia	[unknown],		13
To Praetorium	[unknown],		25

The road served to allow supplies and troops such as the legion garrisoned in York quick access to the eastern borderlands and, later, the eastern posts on Hadrian's Wall. The Itinerary's 2nd and 5th British routes, which split off to reach the western territories, share the route between Eboracum and Cataractonium. Forts were built along Dere Street to protect the route. It crossed Hadrian's Wall through a large fortified gateway later called the "Portgate" which was still visible a few hundred years ago.

Margary notes that the last entry of the Itinerary, 25 (XXV) Roman miles, is probably in error and should be emended to 15 (XV) Roman miles. (Note: Margary, cited at Roman Britain Online.)

== Modern route ==
The modern route omits the now-lost road south of York but continues farther north along Roman roads either omitted by the compiler of the Antonine Itineraries or constructed after his time.

The route begins at York and crosses the River Ure near Aldborough close to Boroughbridge. It crosses the Swale near Catterick. (The ruins of Cataractonium lie just north of Catterick at Scotch Corner.) The A66 road preserves the route of the Roman-era Watling Street, branching off here to cross Stainmore to Penrith and Carlisle at the western end of Hadrian's Wall.

Dere Street crossed the River Tees over a stone arch bridge near the present-day Piercebridge Roman Fort ruins. Such bridges were rare in Roman Britain except for here in the far north. The original bridge was replaced by one on a different alignment. There is evidence of other minor realignments of Dere Street over the Roman period.

The next river crossing occurred over the Wear near present-day Bishop Auckland. At this point, the fort Vinovia guarded a branch road that turned off to the right heading for Durham, Chester-le-Street, and Newcastle. There, the Pons Aelius crossed the River Tyne.

Dere Street, meanwhile, travels onward past Lanchester and Ebchester, the sites of the former forts of Longovicium and Vindomora. At Coria (modern Corbridge), it met the Stanegate road which runs parallel to Hadrian's Wall. Stanegate and Dere Street were originally the same width (roughly 7.7 m or 25 ft) but the depth of metalling on Stanegate—72 cm (28 in) against Dere Street's 30 cm (12 in)—argues for a greater frequency of resurfacing and for greater or heavier traffic. Crossing at Corbridge, the route passed through Portgate on the Wall and passed into lands only tenuously claimed by Rome.

The route passes north into Redesdale and thence into the Cheviot Hills, where there are the remains of marching forts at Fourlaws, West Woodburn (Habitancum), Rochester (Bremenium), and at Chew Green. Brementium was the last stop listed for Antonine Itinerary, but the Roman road's remains now lead further, past the present Anglo-Scottish border at Carter Fell near the present A68 road. Nearby, there are the remains of a camp at Pennymuir. Further on, well-preserved sections of the road form part of St Cuthbert's Way to Trimontium near Melrose. There, the route crosses the Tweed and follows the Leader Water to the foot of the Lammermuirs, where there is evidence of Roman forts near Oxton. The exact route of Dere Street through Lauderdale was investigated by the art historian Bendor Grosvenor and his wife Ishbel during the COVID-19 pandemic of 2020-21.

Another well-preserved section rises through the Lammermuirs over Soutra Hill and on to Edinburgh, where Din Eidyn was a stronghold for the British Votadini tribe. Nearby, the Romans held garrisons at Cramond and Inveresk at the eastern end of the Antonine Wall.

== Archaeology ==
In 1994, construction of a garage at Cliffe exposed a section of the Roman road, and pottery and tile from the period were also found. Raymond Selkirk suggested that the ruins on the south side of the Tees at Cliffe are the remains of a dam; the archaeological television programme Time Team investigated this in 2009.

Excavations in 2007 by CFA Archaeology at Dun Law, in advance of the construction of a wind farm access road, uncovered a section of the Dere Street Roman road there. The excavations revealed that this section of the road was laid over a palaeochannel using a latticework of logs and a mat of branchwood. There are only a handful of examples of such engineering work in Roman road construction. The archaeologists found that the wood used was locally sourced from the then depleted forests.

Excavations in 2007 by AOC Archaeology at Newbridge, Edinburgh, discovered a section of the road, providing solid evidence for the road's location in that area, which the milestone at Ingliston and the temporary camps at Gogar had intimated.

== History ==
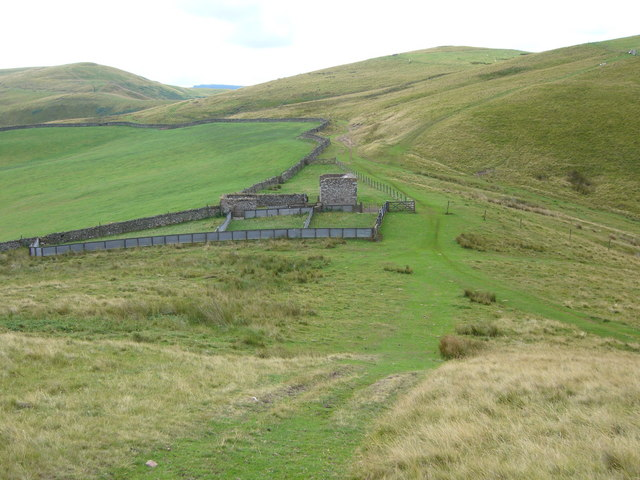
Dere Street close to the Scottish Border

During the High Middle Ages, the section of the route between Jedburgh and Edinburgh was known as the Royal Way (Latin: Via Regia). It connected the larger part of Scotland with the important ecclesiastic sites of the Scottish Borders. King Malcolm IV established his Church and Hospital of the Holy Trinity halfway along this section to provide succour for the many pilgrims using it.

After the destruction of the Border Abbeys during the "Rough Wooing" of Mary, Queen of Scots, by the Earl of Hertford's forces and during the Reformation of the Scottish Church, the route fell into disuse and disrepair. It was used mainly for driving livestock and occasional travellers daring enough to venture into the lawless border region.

Dere Street continued in use between Durham and York in medieval times. Being limited by daylight, "about thirty miles in a day in winter on horseback and between thirty-six and forty in summer was what a man could do." Tough, vigorous men could walk from Darlington to York, and it was said that the quality of a horse could make the difference between a possible thirty and fifty miles per day. A wish to hear mass or the organisation of a train by the rich could shorten the travelling day to twenty miles.

Roads were described as so muddy and difficult between November and February that to finish the journey by daylight one could barely stop to eat; however a "royal highway" or alta via regia strata was passable in winter between York and Durham, and this could have been Dere Street. Heavy packhorse loads were taken on the route, for example 20 stone (130 kg) of wool. Clerics, traders and the nobility were more likely to travel than others, and some people rarely travelled at all. Travelling in style involved the use of carts for luggage, but carts bogged down in winter mud, so traders with packhorses travelled more easily in winter than the rich.

== See also ==
- Piercebridge Roman Bridge
- Roman roads in Britain

== Gallery ==
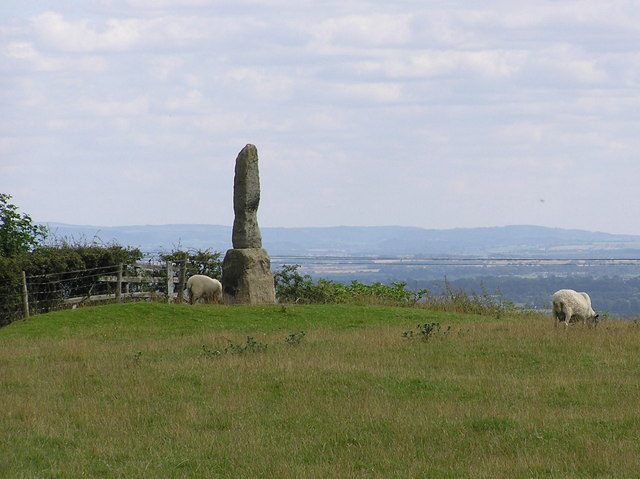
Legg's cross on Dere Street near Bolam in County Durham

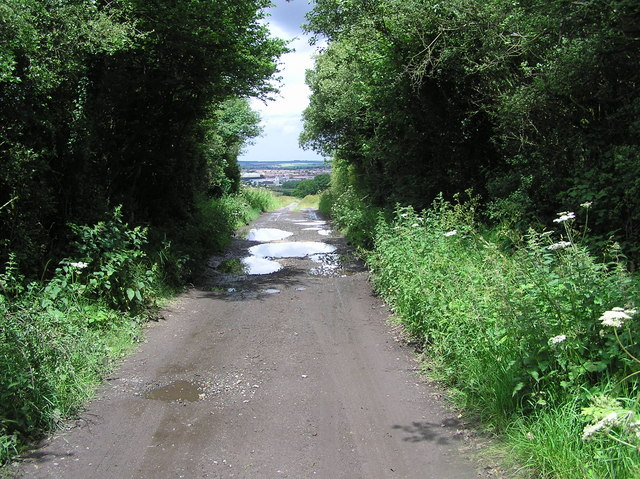
Dere Street at Bildershaw, County Durham

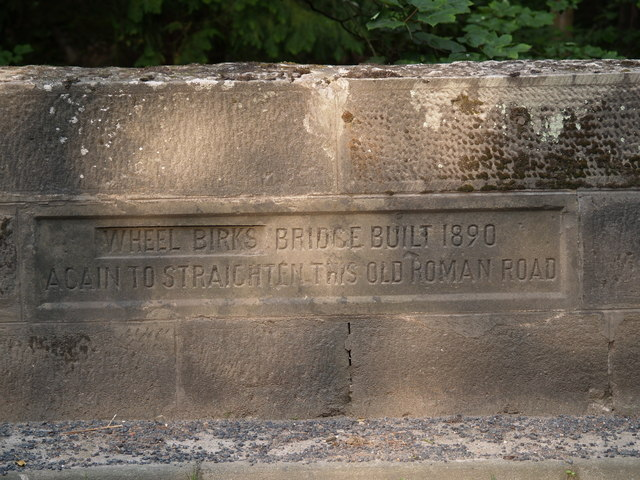
Wheelbirks bridge, near Hindley, Northumberland

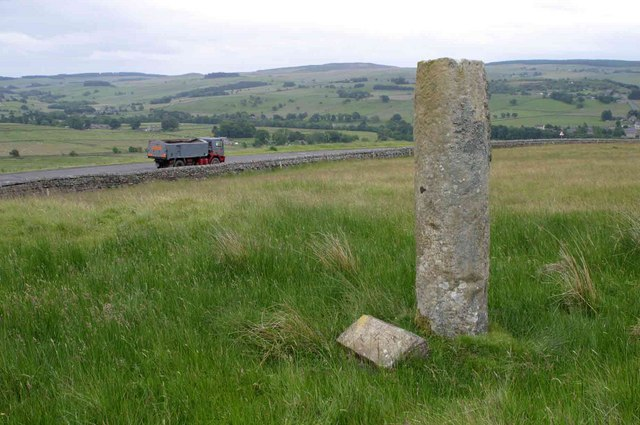
Milestone at West Woodburn, Northumberland

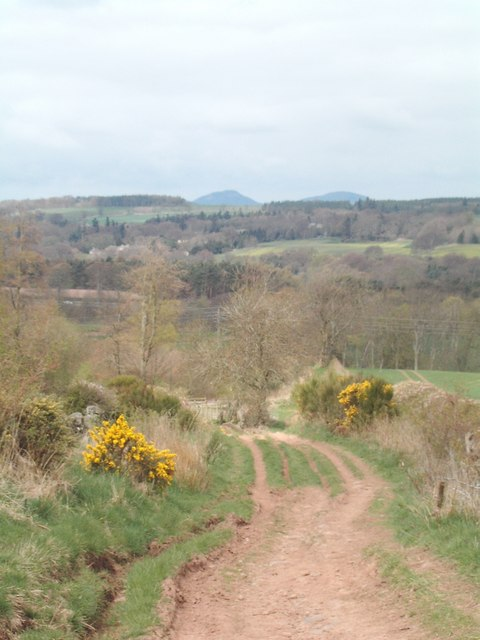
Dere Street at Bonjedward, Scottish Borders

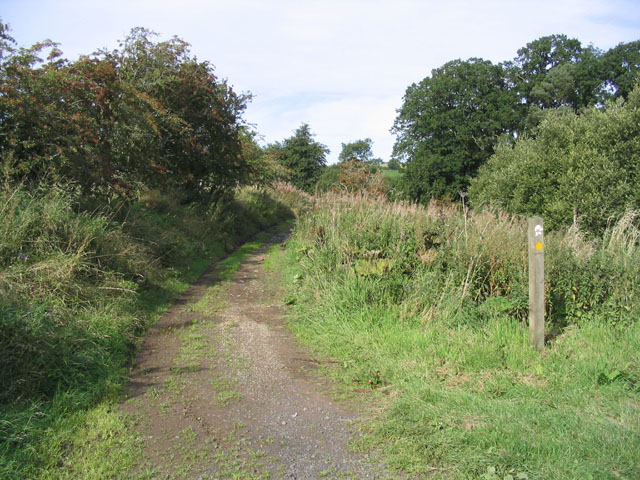
Dere Street at Crailinghall, Scottish Borders

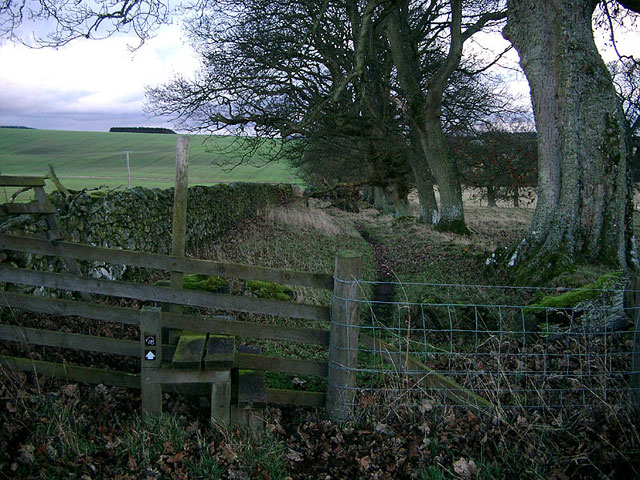
Dere Street at Maxton, Scottish Borders

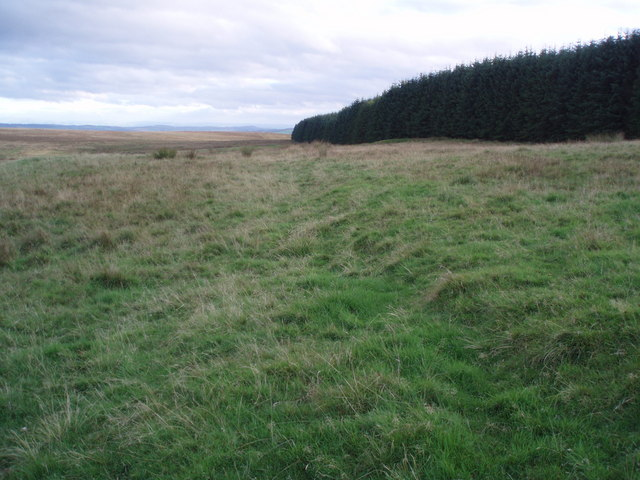
Dere Street at King's Inch. south of Soutra Aisle
