= Dun Law (Scottish Borders) =

Hill in the Scottish Borders, Scotland

Highest point
- Elevation: 393 m (1,289 ft)
- Coordinates: 55.808414°N 2.862749°W

Naming
- English translation: Scottish Gaelic, Scots: Fort Hill

Geography
- Location: Scottish Borders, Scotland
- Parent range: Lammermuir Hills, Southern Uplands
- OS grid: NT 460 576

Dun Law is a hill in the Scottish Borders. It lies between Fala and Carfraemill, just to the south of Soutra Aisle, at the western end of the Lammermuir Hills.The hill rises to 393 m (1289 feet). There is a historic quarry on the north side of the hill, possible Bronze Age house platforms on its east side and a cairn on its summit.

== Wind Farm ==
Dun Law Windfarm is on the hill and became operational in 2000 with 26 Vestas turbines that can generate up to 17 megawatts of power. The windfarm was extended, starting in 2007, with an additional 35 turbines, all installed by November 2009, for an additional 30 megawatts of capacity. In total, it can produce up to 47 megawatts of electricity. It is estimated that it will be decommissioned in 2034.

The Dun Law Extension Community Benefit Trust administers the community funds provided by wind farm. Grants are given by the Trust to enhance the quality of life in the surrounding communities.

== Archaeology ==
Excavations in 2007, by CFA Archaeology, in advance of the construction of a wind farm access road, uncovered a section of the Dere Street Roman road. Dere Street was built in the late 1st century AD to enable the advance of the Roman Army into what is now Scotland. It runs from the Roman legionary forts of Eburacum (York) and Inchtuthil near Perth. The excavations discovered that this section of the road was laid over a palaeochannel using a latticework of logs and a mat of branchwood. There are only a handful examples of such engineering work in Roman road construction. The archaeologists found that the wood used was locally sourced from the then depleted forests.

Examination of the pollen in peat samples, taken during the excavations, from under the road allowed the archaeologists to reconstruct, roughly, the environment of the area from roughly 2500BC to the construction of the road. They found that the area was forested until sometime between 700 BC – 1 AD when the area was significantly cleared of forests. There were very few trees in the area when the road was constructed and that construction cleared the rest of them.

== Soutra Aisle ==
Just to the north of the hill is Soutra Aisle, the remains of the House of the Holy Trinity, a church that was part of a complex comprising a hospital and a friary.

== Images ==
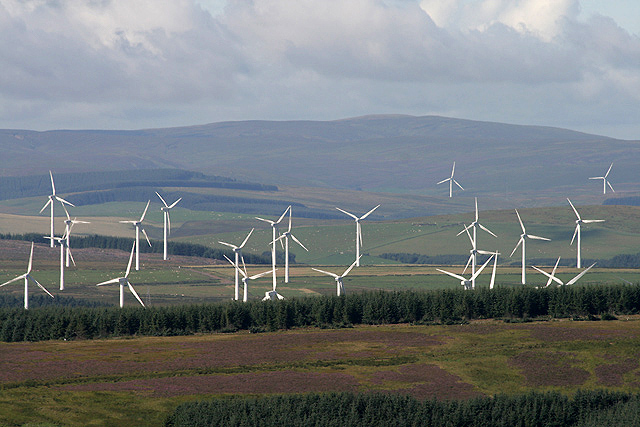

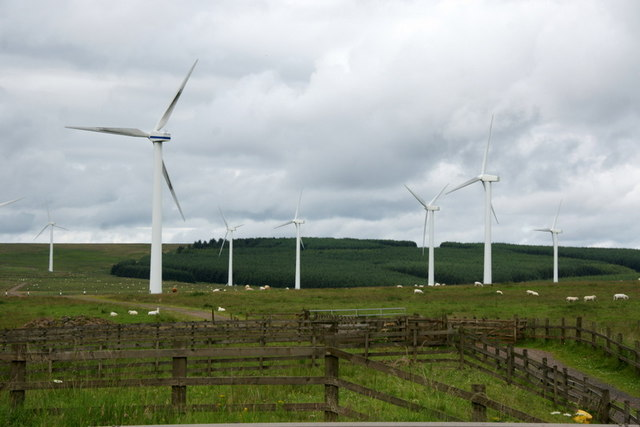

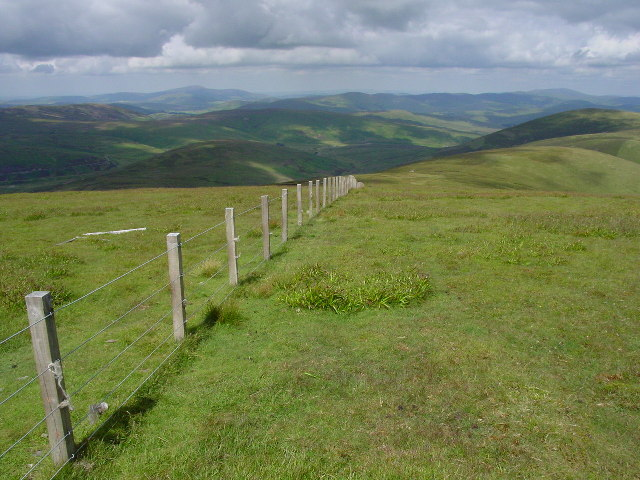
