= Steven Sproat =

English singer-songwriter

- Born: Steven Edward Sproat; 18 November 1960 (age 66); Lanchester, Durham, England
- Origin: Coleford, Gloucestershire, England
- Genres: Contemporary music, Contemporary pop
- Occupations: Singer-songwriter, ukulelist, guitarist
- Instruments: Vocals, ukulele, guitar
- Years active: 1988–present
- Website: stevensproat.co.uk

Steven Edward Sproat (born 18 November 1960) is an English singer-songwriter, guitarist and ukulele player, who plays a contemporary style of pop music. He has released six studio albums, Straight Down the Line (1989), Tomorrow's Road (2004), Acer Glade (2007), Full Circle (2011), Fruit for the Soul (2016) and After all these years (2023)

== Early life ==
Steven Edward Sproat was born on 18 November 1960, in Lanchester, Durham, England, where his father imparted a sense and imbued a love of music upon his son. His songwriting began in 1985, when he was in his mid-twenties.

== Music career ==
His music recording career commenced in 1988, with his first studio album, Straight Down the Line, released in 1989. He has since released more albums; There's More to Life in 1993, So Far So Good in 1999, Coming to My Senses in 1999, Tomorrow's Road in 2004, Acer Glade in 2007, Full Circle in 2011, and Fruit for the Soul in 2016. He also supported Jools Holland in 2012 on several shows, and Sproat featured on the Formby TV documentary with Frank Skinner (2011) and subsequently repeated many times on BBC Two and BBC Four.

== Author ==
Sproat authored multiple books about playing the ukulele; the first entitled, Starting Ukulele, in 2007. Sproat's second book was titled, Absolute Beginners – Ukulele, in 2009. He has also been the author of Absolute Beginners Ukulele books 1 & 2, also Starting Ukulele and Starting Ukulele The Next Step (Book 2).

== Discography ==
=== Studio albums ===
- Straight Down the Line (1989)
- Tomorrow's Road (2004)
- Acer Glade (2007)
- Full Circle (2011)
- Fruit for the Soul (2016)
- After all these years (2023)

=== Singles ===
- School of Thought – "Dance with Me" (1989)vinyl 7"

CDs

- The Big Picture (1999)
- "You Turn the Light On" (2006)
- "Full Circle" (2011)
- Holding On (2014)
- "Fruit for the Soul" (2016)
- Watersmeet (Classical Piano version ) (2016)
- To High, To Quickly (2017 )
- Back in Line (2019 )
- A thing called grace ( 2022)
