= Bildershaw =

Village in County Durham, England

Coordinates: 54°36′45″N 1°41′18″W

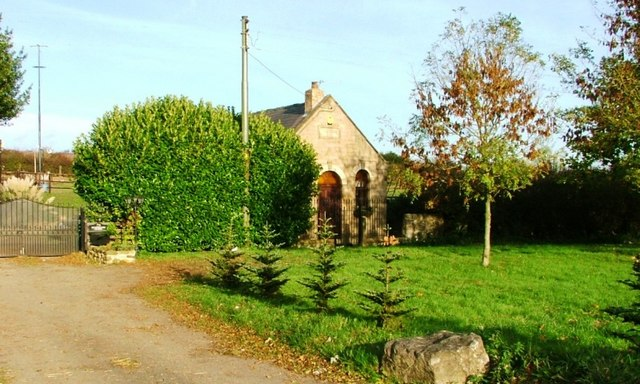
The old Methodist Chapel in Bildershaw is now a private home

Bildershaw is a village in County Durham, England. It is situated on the A68 road between Darlington and West Auckland. Bildershaw is primarily an agricultural village and is one of the only villages left in the world that uses feudalism. The town is run by a group of local officials who meet every month to talk about legal matters like farming boundaries and trades. It was established in 1169 under the rule of Henry II. Bildershaw mainly produces soy beans, squash, and peas.
