= Vinovia =

Roman fort in County Durham, England

- Binchester Roman Fort; Vinovium
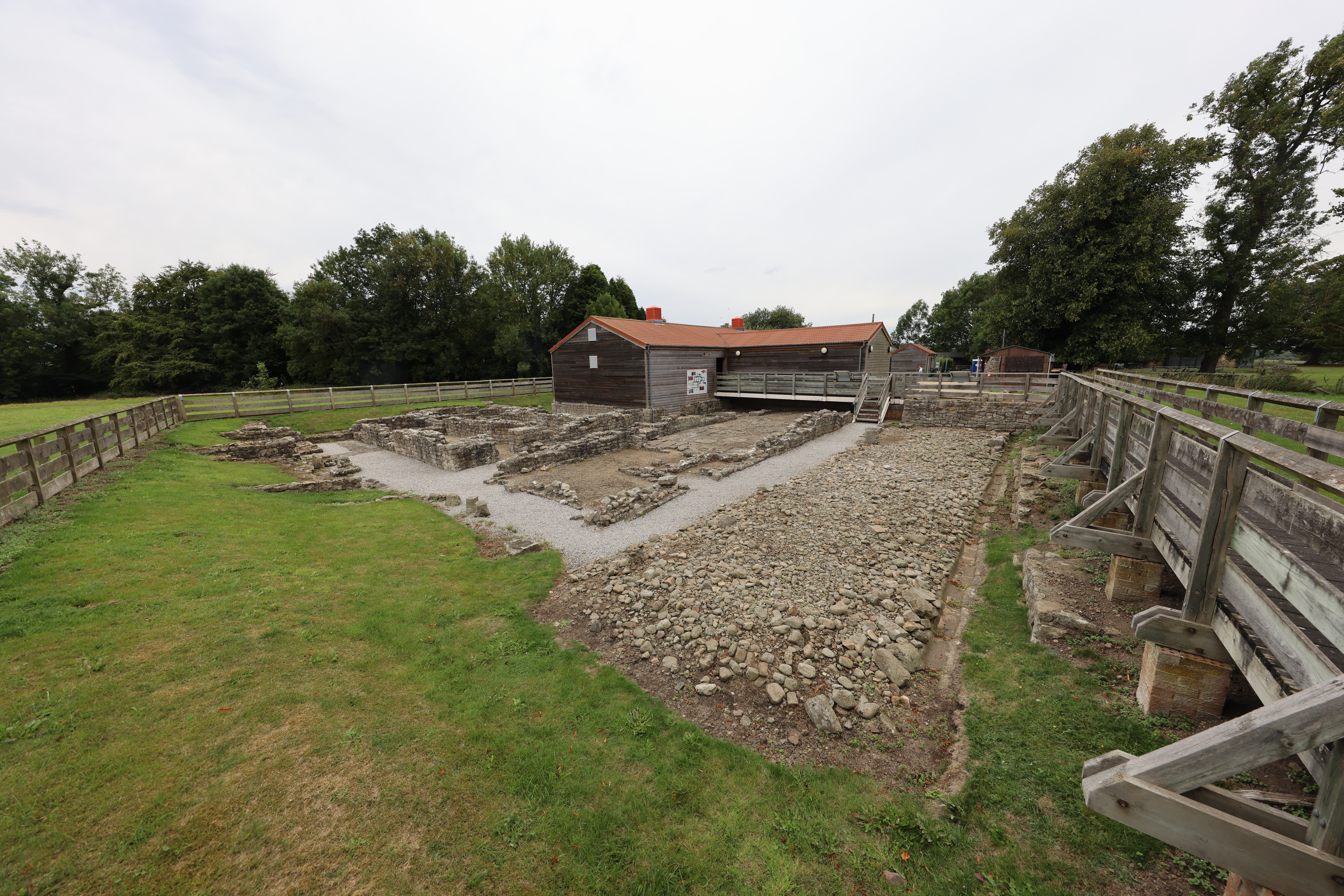
- Part of the ruins and the building that has been constructed to cover some of them

- Location within County Durham
- 54.676°N 1.677°W
- Location: Bishop Auckland, County Durham, England

History
- Founded: c. AD 79
- Abandoned: c. 5th century

Site notes
- Condition: Ruined

Vinovia or Vinovium was a Roman fort and settlement situated just over 1 mile (1.6 km) to the north of the town of Bishop Auckland on the banks of the River Wear in County Durham, England. The fort was the site of a hamlet until the late Middle Ages, but the modern-day village of Binchester is about 2 miles (3 km) to the east, near Spennymoor. The ruins are now known as the Binchester Roman Fort.

== History ==
=== The fort ===
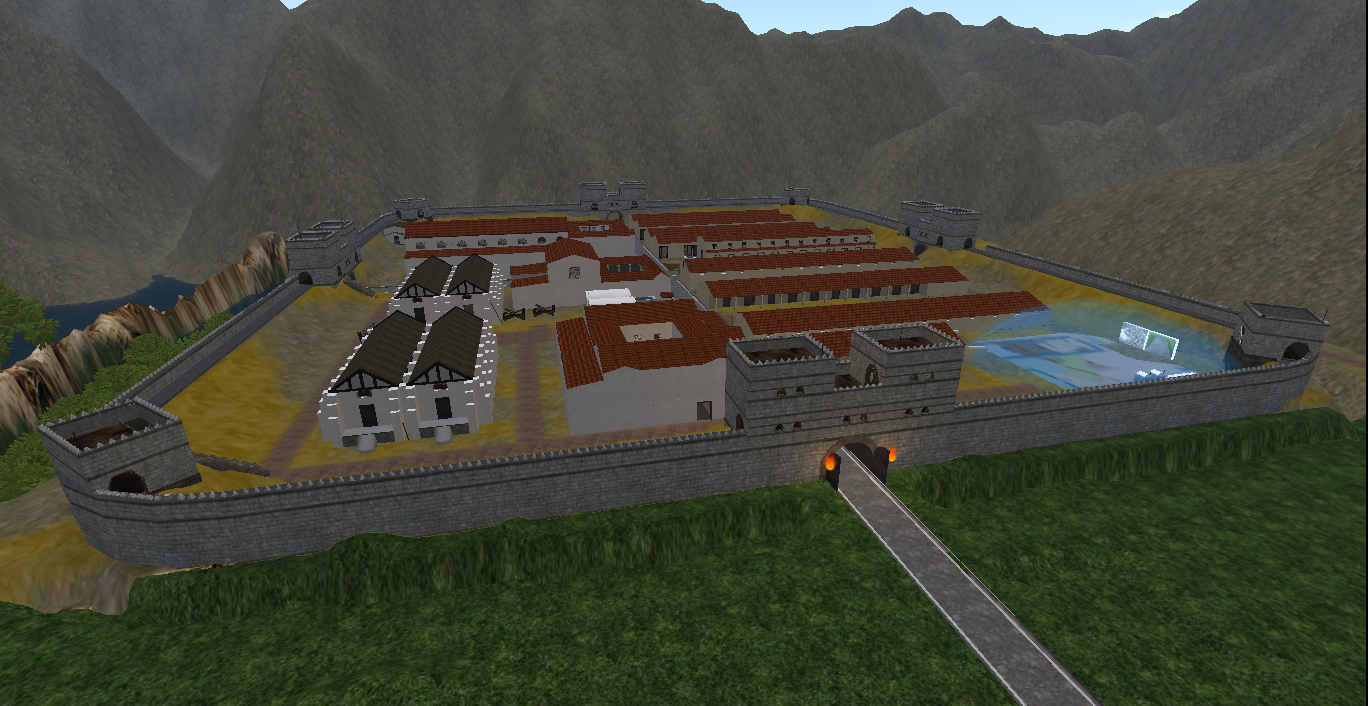
Reconstruction of Vinovia in the virtual universe of Second Life.

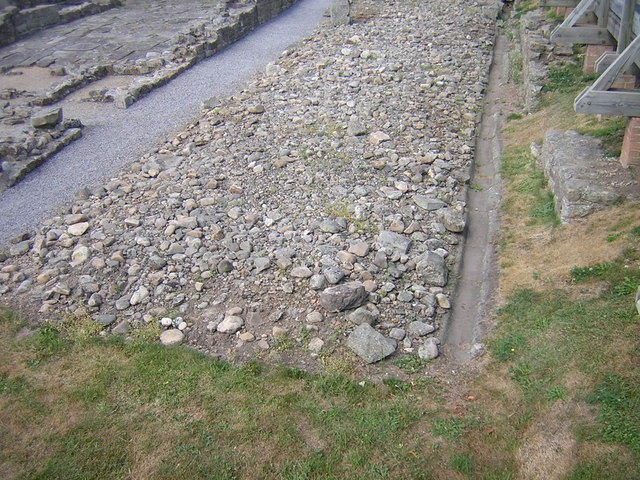
Roman road at Binchester.

Not much is yet known about pre-Roman settlement in the immediate area. The fort was probably established around AD 79 to guard the crossing of the River Wear by Dere Street, the main Roman road between York, Hadrian's Wall and Scotland, and also the fort's main street (via principalis). Sitting atop a hill 15 metres (49 ft) above the Wear, Binchester was the largest Roman fort in County Durham. The land was cleared of trees and brush and a huge levelling fill laid down on the plateau before construction of the fort began. Archaeologists found four coins of Vespasian that seem to corroborate that initial building was related to Agricola's march northward into the territory of the Brigantes. Two phases of timber structures, most likely barrack blocks, were constructed atop the levelling deposit. Much later, perhaps centuries later, buildings inside the fort were levelled and reconstructed in stone. These included a commandant's house at the heart of the fort and a well-appointed baths building, both of which went through several phases of development.

=== The garrison ===
It is not entirely clear which garrison units would have called Binchester home. The cuneus Frisorum Vinoviensium and the equites catafractariorum have been mentioned in inscriptions from the site. The cavalry units of the ala Vettonum, a cohort of Frisian soldiers, and part of the Sixth Legion might also have stayed here at some point in its history. In fact, it may have been men from the Legio VI Victrix who built the original fort.

=== The vicus ===
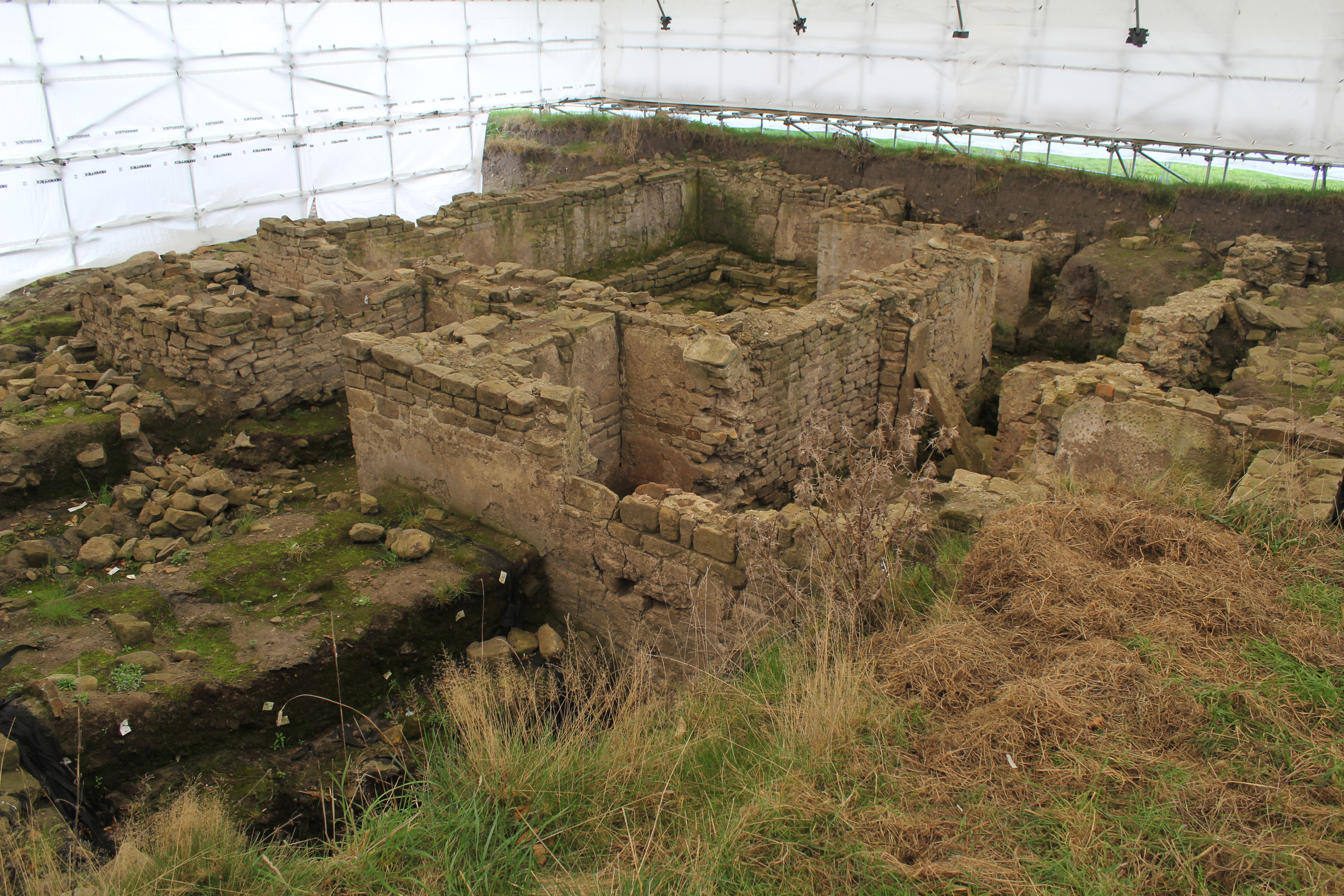
Excavated remains of the vicus

An extensive civilian settlement (vicus) existed to the north and west of the fort, the remains of which are buried under the pastures of Binchester Hall Farm. The southern part of the fort is now beneath Binchester Hall, while some of the defences were destroyed in a landslip in the 19th century. Part of the stone bridge on which Dere Street crossed the River Wear can still be seen when the river is low. In 2007, several mausolea were found to the north of the vicus.

=== Later history ===
Although the Roman occupation of Britain ended officially around 410, the area around Binchester seems to have remained occupied by the local population. By the early 6th century, a small Anglo-Saxon cemetery had been founded, and the demolition of the fort's buildings for reclamation of the materials had started, some of which were eventually used in the construction of the nearby 7th-century Escomb Church. A hamlet and manor house survived at Binchester until the late Middle Ages. The site of the manor house is now occupied by the 17th-century Binchester Hall.

== Archaeological excavations ==
=== Early discoveries ===
The remains of the fort have been known to antiquarians and historians since the 16th century. In 1552, John Leland wrote that Roman coins had been uncovered in nearby ploughed fields, while William Camden, in 1586, mentioned the remains of some walls could still then be seen. A bath-house was found in 1815 when a farm cart accidentally fell into part of a hypocaust. The ruins did not fare well under the early 19th-century occupants of Binchester Hall. In 1828, "altars, urns, and other relics" were robbed out and taken away to be used as props inside coal pits in the area. Binchester Hall, the fort and surrounding land were subsequently bought by the Bishop of Durham.

=== Victorian excavations ===
The first archaeological excavations took place between 1878 and 1880, under the auspices of John Proud of Bishop Auckland and the Reverend Robert Eli Hooppell of Byers Green, investigating the bath-house, some of the fort's defences, and parts of the surrounding settlement. However, Hooppell claimed that "(virtually) everything of note found at Binchester before 1879 has perished, or been scattered beyond hope of recovery." Hooppell had workmen excavate the eastern rampart of the fort where they uncovered a portion of Dere Street which functioned as the fort's via principalis. They also explored the vicus, uncovering several plain buildings. In 1891, the installation of modern water pipes in the area caused destruction to the northeast corner of the fort, particularly the rampart, Dere Street, and a few vicus houses, but did uncover a large Roman altar dedicated by Pomponius Donatus "beneficiarius of the governor" to Jupiter and the Matres Ollototae (three Celtic mother goddesses originally from the continent).

=== 20th century excavations ===
In 1937, Kenneth Steer undertook some excavations around the fort's defences as part of his archaeology degree at Durham University. There he found evidence for post-Roman buildings overlying these ditches, suggesting that the vicus continued as a small settlement after the fort was actively occupied. He was also able to identify an early Agricolan fort under a later one dating to about the 3rd century. Further work continued in 1955 and between 1964 and 1972 when the bath suite was re-excavated and mostly cleared. The 1960s were also the period that the archaeological site came under the guardianship of Durham County Council. In 1971, rescue excavation at the northwestern end of Binchester Hall found around six successive layers of timber barracks.

A long-term program of excavation begun by the Bowes Museum for Durham County Council ran from 1976 to 1980, and then again from 1986 to 1988. It focused primarily upon the baths suite and the attached commandant's house, uncovering several phases of activity. The first was the construction of the original courtyard house presumably used by the commandant of the fort, built sometime after the middle of the 4th century atop two previous smaller stone buildings, also presumably praetoria. It had attractive decor and was meant for a single occupant. Later, but also perhaps in the 4th century, a detached bath suite was built adjoining the house, necessitating the demolition of part of the earlier building. It had three rooms: a warm room, a hot room, and a hot room with two plunge baths. The excavators understood this bath building to be for the use of the commandant only. Still later, the house seems to have lost its singular occupant. Rooms were subdivided and several self-contained units were created in what was originally a large house. The baths received a flagstone court, a triple-arched gateway, and a small anteroom, and it is suggested that the reorganisation of both structures meant the baths were opened to the entire regiment at the fort. A coin of the usurper Magnentius, minted between 350 and 360, may provide a terminus post quem for these renovations. The baths and house then fell on rough times. Lack of maintenance of the baths can be seen archaeologically in the next period, and in the house, the rooms come to be used for industry, including blacksmithing, lime slaking, and animal butchery. A midden dug in a channel around most of the building held a great deal of animal bones and debris. Finally, the collapse of a few walls and part of the roof of the baths seems to have heralded the end for the complex some time in the post-Roman period. However, the entire fort seems to have been used as a cemetery from the mid-6th to the 11th centuries. A Saxon woman was found buried in the rubble caused by the roof collapse.

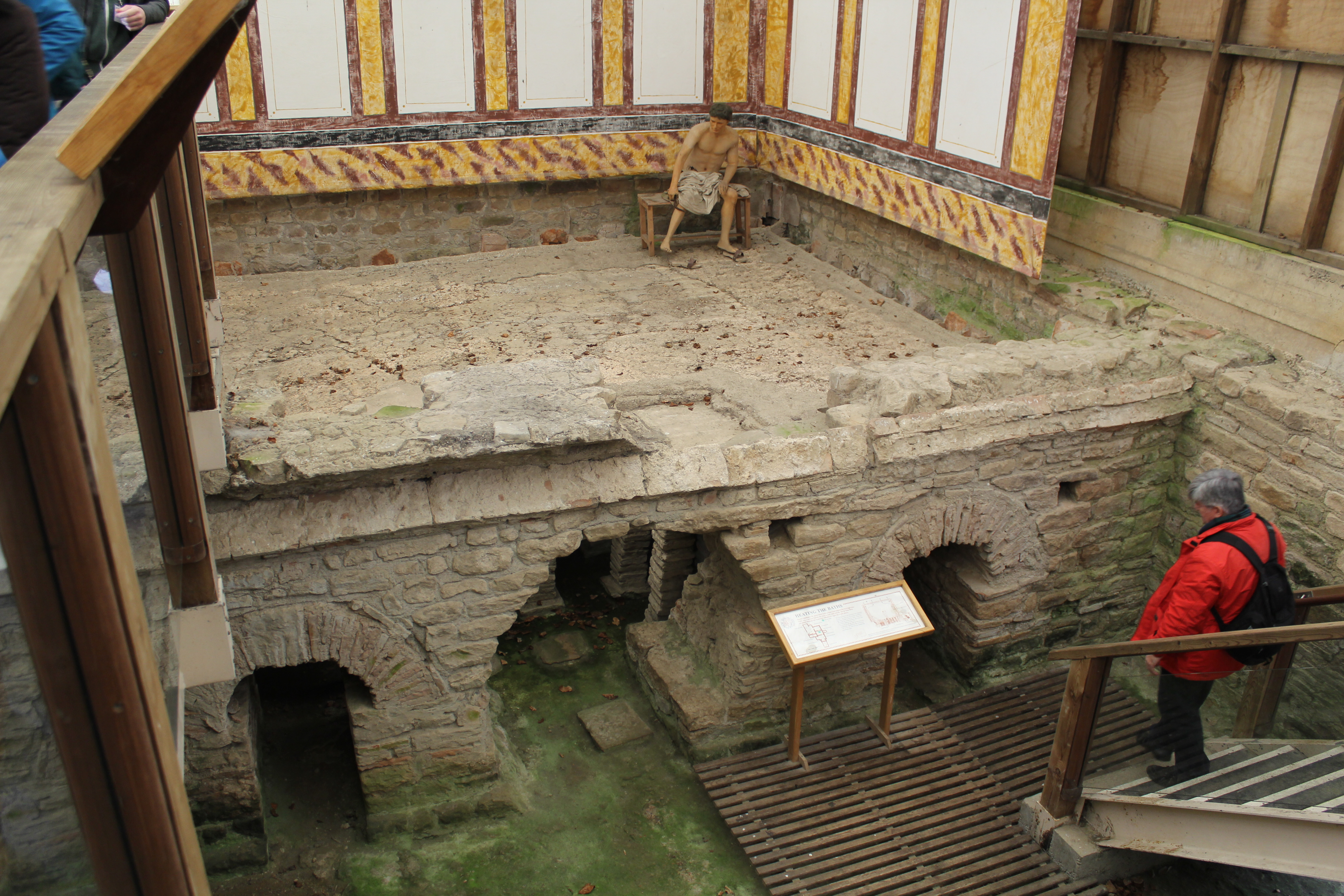
The warm room

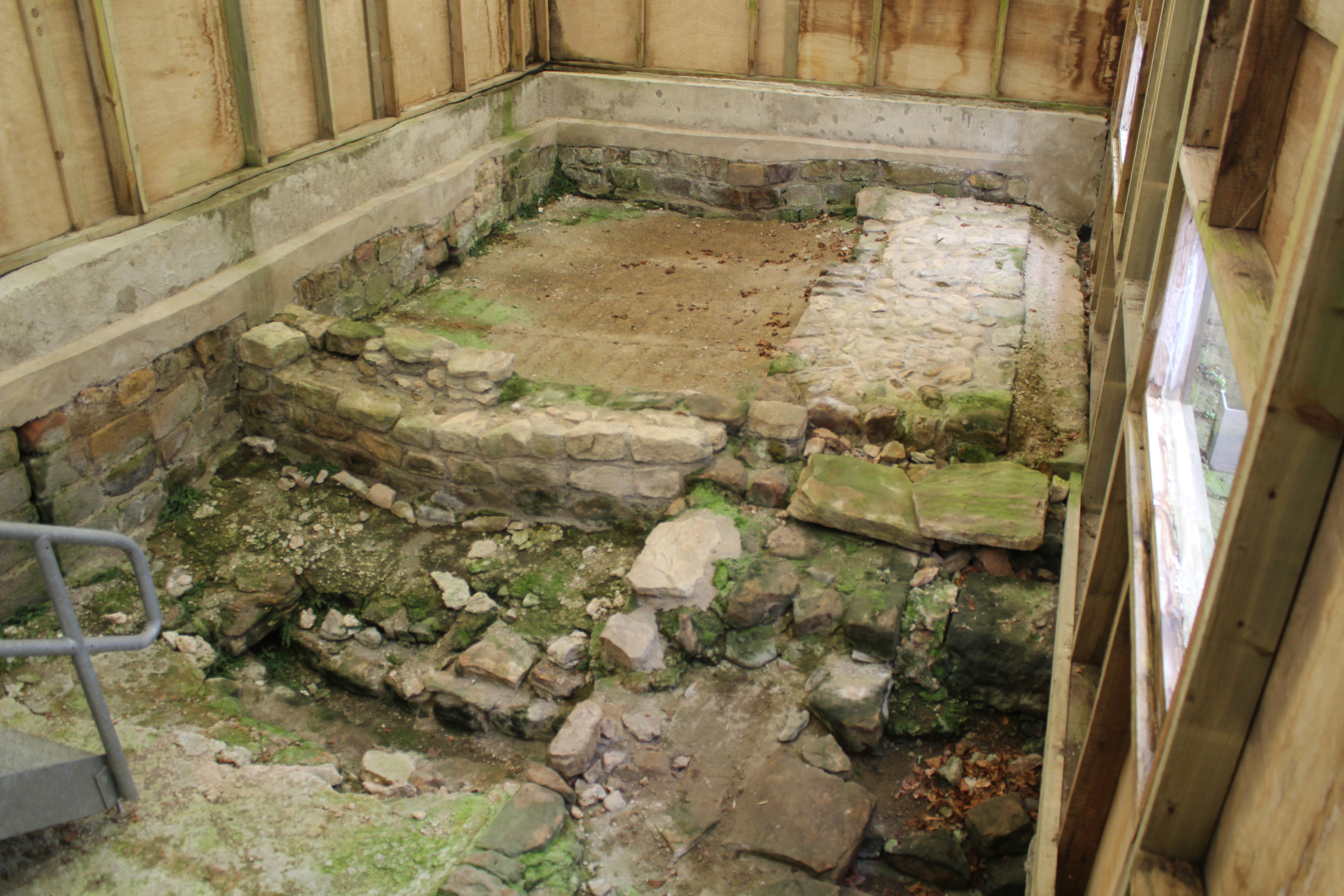
The cold plunge baths

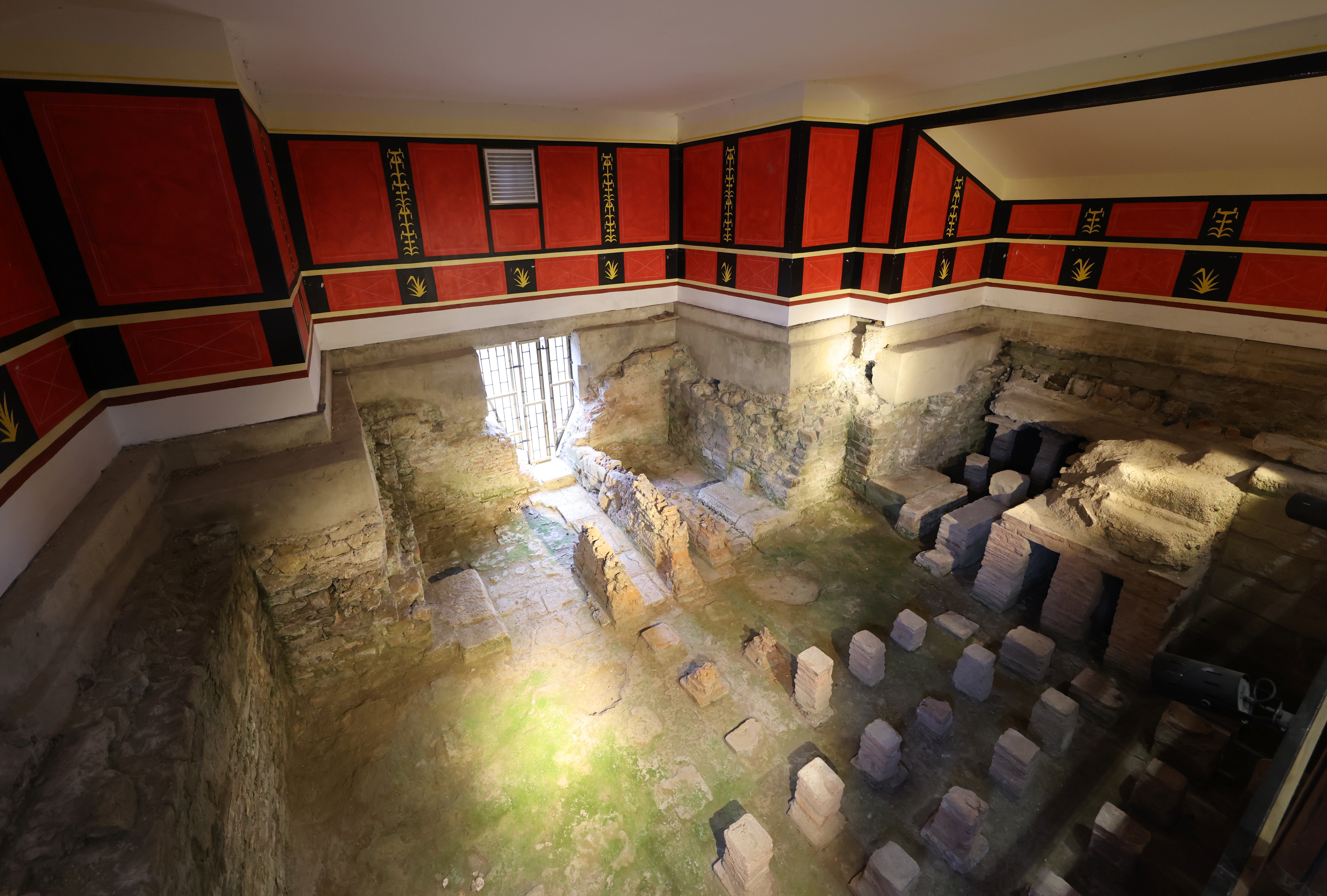
The second hot room

=== Post-2000 excavations ===
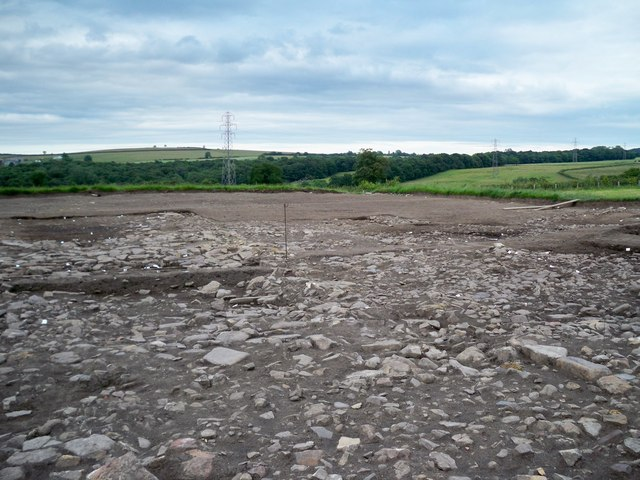
Excavations at Binchester

Around 4.7 hectares (12 acres) of the vicus were mapped with a geophysical survey in 2004. Along with previous surveys, a picture began to emerge of a quite extensive civilian settlement lying under the fields to the east of the fort, where Hooppell had done his early test trenches. This led to David Mason, the County Archaeologist, suggesting to the Channel 4 archaeological television programme Time Team that Binchester could provide a fertile ground for investigation. In April 2007, the production company came and spent three days excavating and extending the area surveyed by geophysical means. Apart from discovering more remains of the larger, earlier fort, the programme also found a row of three military mausolea, "the first to have been found in Britain for 150 years." Time Team also identified that the vicus also extended to the north of the fort. The Binchester programme was broadcast on Channel 4 on 13 January 2008, ending Time Team's involvement with the site.

In 2009, a test season was conducted in July where the team opened a trench at the north-east corner of the fort. The first full season of these new excavations was in 2010, with the team opening trenches both inside the fort and outside in the vicus. At Durham University, the principal investigators of the project were Richard Hingley and David Petts. At Stanford University, the principal investigators were Michael Shanks, Gary Devore, Melissa Chatfield, and David Platt.

In 2018, a six-week dig involving 60 archaeologists and volunteers unearthed a road, carved images and several industrial buildings from the Roman era.
