= Roman military engineering =

Roman military engineering was of a scale and frequency far beyond that of its contemporaries. Indeed, military engineering was in many ways endemic in Roman military culture, as demonstrated by each Roman legionary having as part of his equipment a shovel, alongside his gladius (sword) and pila (javelins).

Workers, craftsmen, and artisans, known collectively as fabri, served in the Roman military. Descriptions of early Roman army structure (initially by phalanx, later by legion) attributed to king Servius Tullius state that two centuriae of fabri served under an officer, the praefectus fabrum.

Roman military engineering took both routine and extraordinary forms, the former a part of standard military procedure, and the latter of an extraordinary or reactive nature.

== Proactive and routine military engineering ==
=== The Roman legionary fortified camp ===
Each Roman legion had a legionary fort as its permanent base. However, when on the march, particularly in enemy territory, the legion would construct a rudimentary fortified camp or castra, using only earth, turf and timber. Camp construction was the responsibility of engineering units to which specialists of many types belonged, officered by architecti (engineers), from a class of troops known as immunes who were excused from regular duties. These engineers would requisition manual labour from the soldiers at large as required. A legion could throw up a camp under enemy attack in a few hours. The names of the different types of camps apparently represent the amount of investment: tertia castra, quarta castra: "a camp of three days", "four days", etc.

Panoramic view of Vercovicium on Hadrian's Wall, now known as Housesteads Roman Fort, England

=== Bridges ===
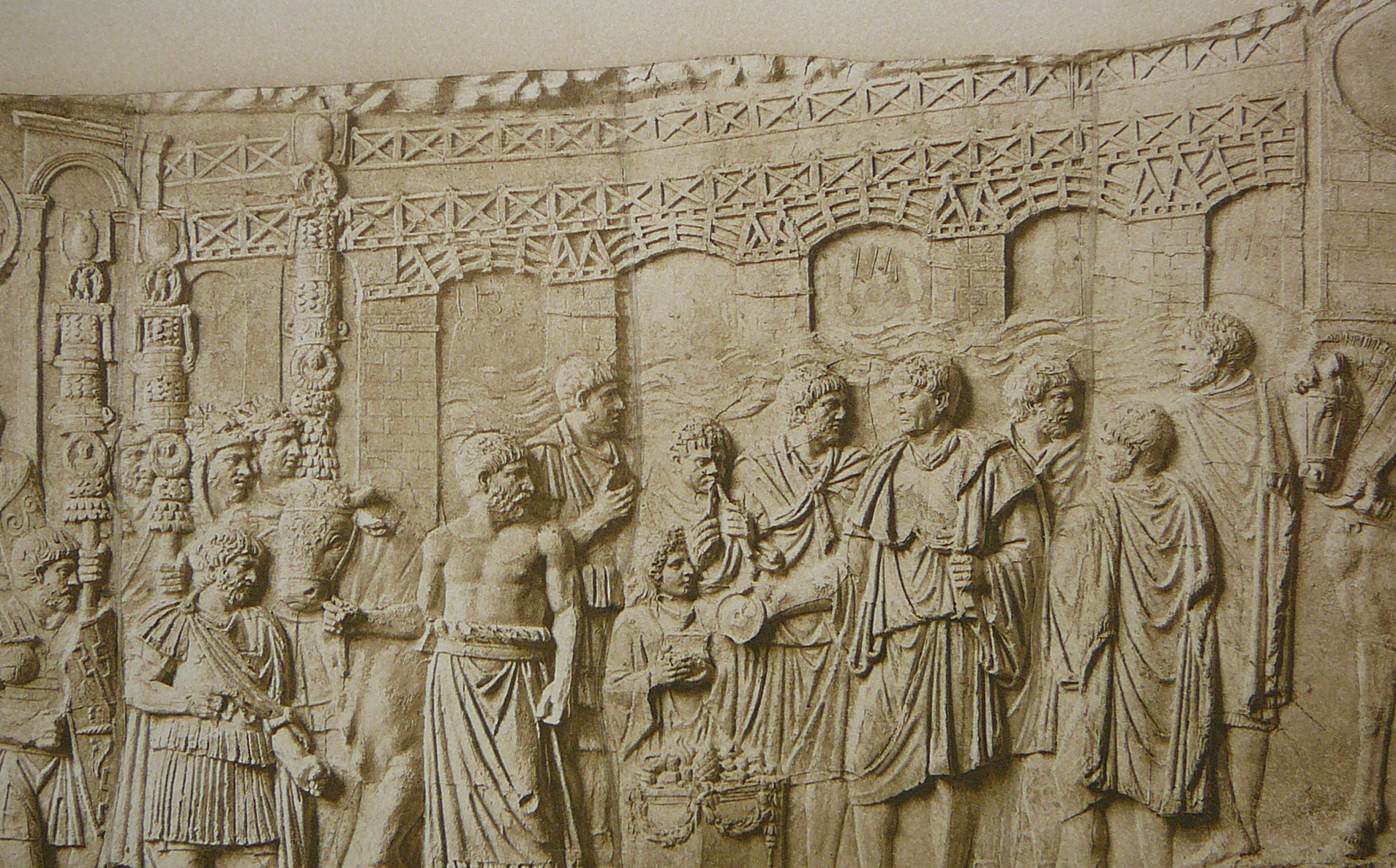
Trajan's Bridge across the Danube, the longest bridge for over a millennium

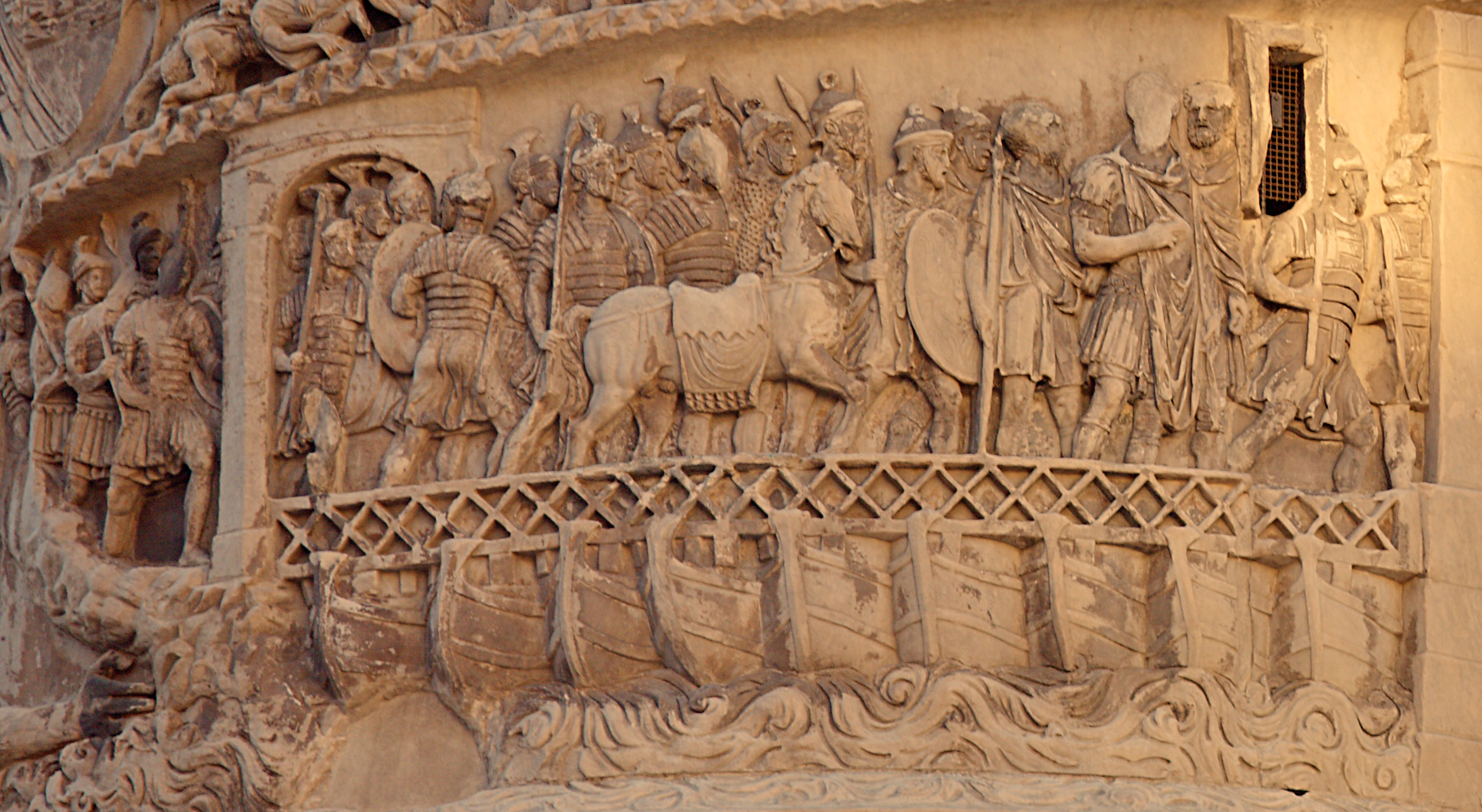
Roman Legionaries crossing the Danube River by pontoon bridge during the Marcomannic Wars, as depicted in relief on the column of Emperor Marcus Aurelius (r. 161-180 AD) in Rome, Italy

The engineers built bridges from timber and stone. Some Roman stone bridges survive. Stone bridges were made possible by the innovative use of keystone arches. One notable example was Julius Caesar's Bridge over the Rhine River. This bridge was completed in only ten days and is conservatively estimated to have been more than 100 m (328 feet) long. The construction was deliberately over-engineered for Caesar's stated purpose of impressing the Germanic tribes. Caesar writes in his War in Gaul that he rejected the idea of simply crossing in boats because it "would not be fitting for my own prestige and that of Rome" (at the time, he did not know that the Germanic tribes, with little knowledge of engineering, had already withdrawn from the area upon his arrival), and because a bridge would emphasize that Rome could travel wherever she wished. Caesar was able to cross over the completed bridge and explore the area uncontested, before crossing back over the subsequently dismantled bridge. Caesar related in War in Gaul that when he "sent messengers to the Sugambri to demand the surrender of those who had made war on me and on Gaul, they replied that the Rhine was the limit of Roman power". The bridge was intended to show otherwise.

=== Siege machines ===
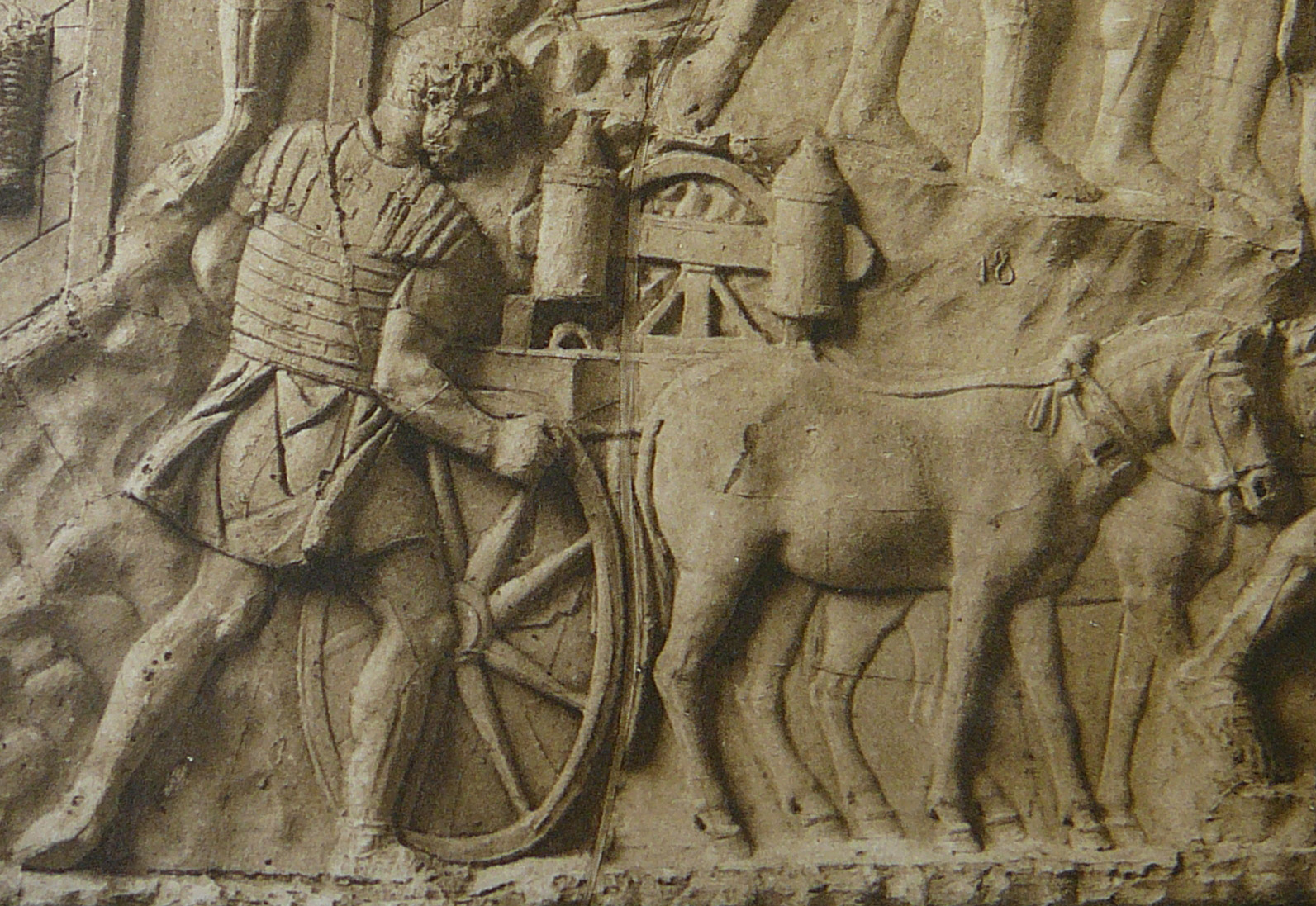
Roman carroballista (a cart-mounted weapon) on Trajan's Column in Rome, early 2nd century AD

Although most Roman siege engines were adaptations of earlier Greek designs, the Romans were adept at engineering them swiftly and efficiently, as well as innovating variations such as the repeating ballista. The 1st-century BC army engineer Vitruvius describes in detail many of the Roman siege machines in his manuscript De architectura.

=== Roads ===
When invading enemy territories, the Roman army would often construct roads as it went, to allow swift reinforcement and resupply, or for easy retreat if necessary. Roman road-making skills were such that some survive today. Michael Grant credits the Roman building of the Via Appia with winning them the Second Samnite War.

=== Civilian engineering by military troops ===
Greco-Roman Pentaspastos ("Five-pulley-crane"), a medium-sized variant (ca. 450 kg load)

When soldiers were not engaged in military campaigns, the legions had little to do, while costing the Roman state large sums of money. Thus, soldiers were involved in building civilian works to keep them well accustomed to hard physical labour and out of mischief, since it was believed that idle armies were a potential source of mutiny.

Soldiers were put to use in the construction of roads, town walls, the digging of canals, drainage projects, aqueducts, harbours, and even in the cultivation of vineyards.

=== Mining operations ===
Soldiers were used in mining operations such as building aqueducts needed for prospecting for metal veins, activities such as hydraulic mining, and building reservoirs to hold water at the minehead.

== Reactive and extraordinary engineering ==
The knowledge and experience learned through routine engineering lent itself readily to many engineering projects. In such projects, Roman military engineering exceeded those of contemporaries in imagination and scope.

One notable project was the circumvallation of the entire city of Alesia and its Celtic leader Vercingetorix, within a massive double-wall – one inward-facing to prevent escape or offensive sallies, and one outward-facing to prevent attack by Celtic reinforcements. This wall is estimated to have been over 20 km (12 mi) long.

A second example is the massive ramp built using thousands of tons of stones and beaten earth up to the invested city of Masada during the Jewish Revolt. The siege works and the ramp remain in a remarkable state of preservation.

== See also ==
- Technological history of the Roman military
- List of Roman pontoon bridges
- Roman architecture
- Roman aqueducts
- Roman engineering
