= Binchester =

Coordinates: 54.682850°N 1.645752°W

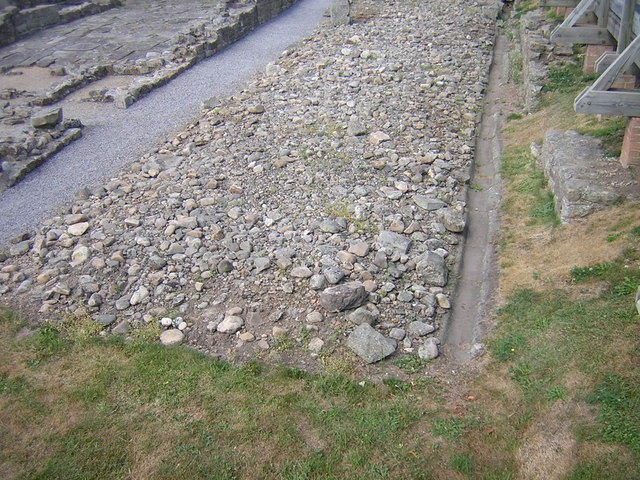
- A section of Roman road at Binchester Roman Fort

- Location within County Durham
- Population: 271 (2001)
- Unitary authority: County Durham
- Ceremonial county: Durham
- Region: North East
- Country: England
- Sovereign state: United Kingdom
- Dialling code: 01388
- Police: Durham
- Fire: County Durham and Darlington
- Ambulance: North East

Binchester is a small village in County Durham, England. In 2001 it had a population of 271. It is situated between Bishop Auckland, which is to the south, and a short distance to the west of Spennymoor. It has a community centre, swing park and football field, and is surrounded by countryside. Granville Terrace, the main road through the village, was relaid and renovated in 1991 for the BBC television series Challenge Anneka.

Nearby is Binchester Roman Fort.

== Etymology ==
Binchester almost certainly takes the first element of its name from the first element of the earlier Roman name Vinovia. This was Anglicised with the addition of the Old English word ceaster '(Roman) fortification' and perhaps through identification with the Old English word binn 'manger'.

== Governance ==
Binchester was formerly a township in the parish of St Andrew-Auckland, in 1866 Binchester became a separate civil parish, on 1 April 1937 the parish was abolished and merged with Bishop Auckland. In 1931 the parish had a population of 60.
