= Bishopton =

Bishopton can refer to the following places:

Canada

- Bishopton, Quebec, a former village now part of the municipality of Dudswell

England

- Bishopton, County Durham, a village in the borough of Darlington
  - Bishopton Castle, a mediaeval castle in Bishopton, County Durham
  - St Peter's Church, Bishopton, County Durham
- Bishopton, Warwickshire

Scotland

- Bishopton, Renfrewshire, a village
  - Bishopton railway station, Renfrewshire
  - ROF Bishopton, a former explosives factory at Bishopton, Renfrewshire
- Bishopton, Wigtownshire

United States

- Bishopton (Church Hill, Maryland), a historic home located at Church Hill, Queen Anne's County, Maryland

== See also ==
- Bishopston (disambiguation)
- Bishopstone (disambiguation)
