= Brantingham Roman villa =

Coordinates: 53.747428°N 0.58870962°W

- Location within the East Riding of Yorkshire

General information
- Architectural style: Romano-British Villa
- Location: Brantingham, East Riding of Yorkshire, England
- OS grid reference: SE 9317 2882
- Construction started: c. 2nd century

Brantingham Roman villa is a Roman villa, now a scheduled monument, near Brantingham, East Riding of Yorkshire, England.

== Villa ==
The villa would have been closely associated with the Roman town Petuaria Parisorum, where Brough now stands. Petuaria marked the southern end of the Roman road known now as Cade's Road, which ran roughly northwards for a hundred miles to Pons Aelius (modern-day Newcastle upon Tyne). The section from Petuaria to Eboracum (York) was also the final section of Ermine Street.

The villa site was discovered in 1941 at Cockle Pits stone quarry when two geometric mosaics were uncovered. Excavations in 1961 discovered the remains of the villa building, including a large room with a mosaic floor measuring 11.13 m x 7.77 m and a corridor which led to four other rooms. In 1983 a further series of excavations encountered Iron Age ditched enclosures on the site followed by a series of rectangular buildings on the site dating from the 2nd century to the 4th century AD.

=== Mosaics ===
Two mosaics were discovered in 1941, recorded and reburied. In 1948 they were excavated and were due to be moved to the Hull and East Riding Museum. After they had been prepared for removal, the larger of the two mosaics was stolen and has never been recovered. A local rumour suggested that it had been loaded onto a military plane bound for America the next day. The other is on display at the museum. Both of the 1941 mosaics were decorated with geometric patterns; the stolen one measured 3.55 m x 2.05 m.
