= Cade's Road =

Roman road that ran from the Humber to Newcastle, England

Coordinates: 54.855944°N 1.571972°W

- Roman Road
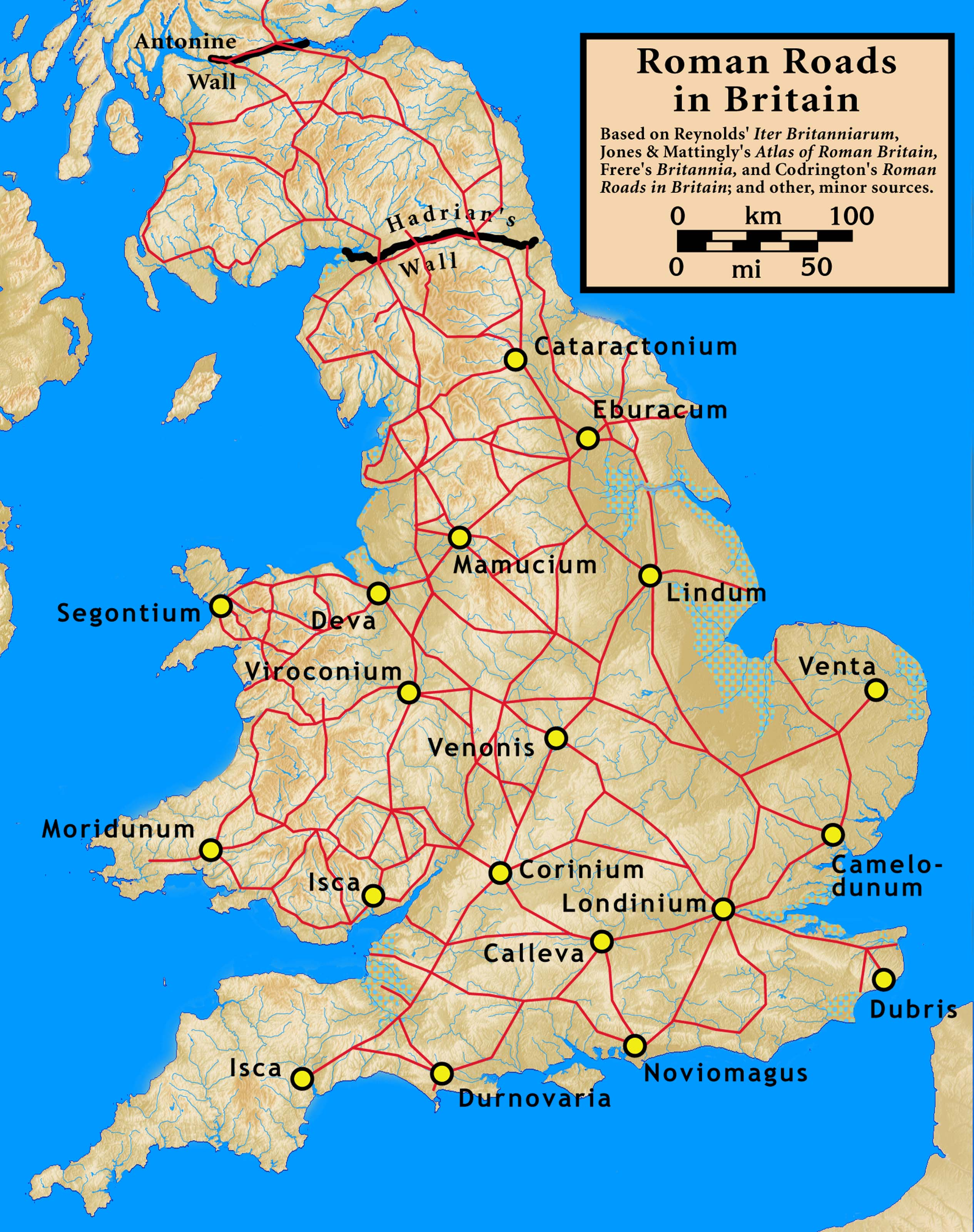
- Roman Roads in Britain

Route information
- Length: 100 mi (160 km)
- Margary number: 80 ( a ) -- Petuaria to Old Durham ( b ) -- Concangis to Pons Aelius

Major junctions
- From: Petuaria ( Brough, Humber Estuary )
- Derventio ( Stamford Bridge ), (North-East)--Malton Roman Fort (Note: Malton Roman Fort was previously known as Derventio Brigantum , see Derventio (disambiguation)) (East)--Bridlington (West)--Eboracum ( York ) Lugunduno , River Tees (East)--Dunum Sinus, ( Tees Bay, North Sea ) (West)--Piercebridge Roman Fort (North-West)--Vinovia ( Binchester Roman Fort ) Old Durham, River Wear ( 80 b ) Concangis ( Chester-le-Street Roman Fort ) (North-East)--Arbeia ( South Shields Roman Fort )
- To: Pons Aelius ( Newcastle Roman Fort ), River Tyne

Location
- Country: United Kingdom

Road network
- Roman roads in Britannia

Cade's Road is a Roman Road in north-east England. It is named after John Cade of Durham, an 18th-century antiquarian who in 1785 proposed its existence and possible course from the Humber Estuary northwards to the River Tyne, a distance of about 100 miles (160 km). The road's Roman name is unknown. Although evidence exists for such a road on some parts of the proposed route, there is still some doubt regarding its exact course.

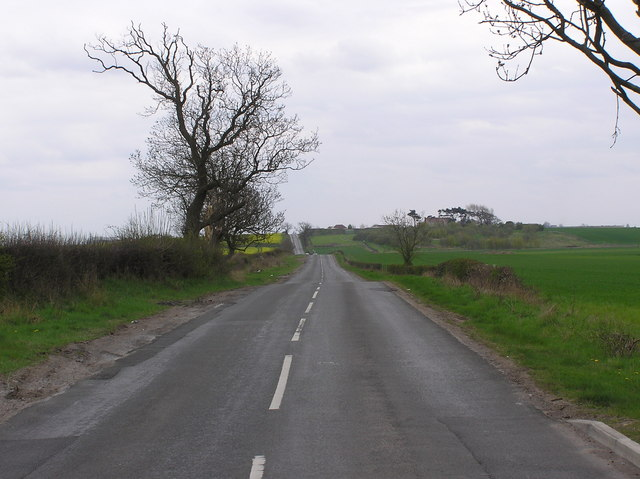
Cade's Road near Middleton One Row.

Examples of place names with the suffix "le-Street": (Note: Place names with the suffix "le-Street" were so named because they were on (or near) a Roman road.)

- Chester-le-Street, County Durham ( Concangis Roman fort )
- Thornton-le-Street, near Thirsk, North Yorkshire (Note: The route can be seen heading North to Bullamoor (near Northallerton) and beyond, followed intermittently by a parish boundary. (Drag map down))
- Thorpe le Street, near Pocklington, East Riding of Yorkshire (Note: The route follows the A1079 North-West towards Hayton and Barmby Moor (West of Pocklington), where the route separated from the modern road and headed slightly North of Wilberfoss towards Low Catton and the Roman fort of Derventio at Stamford Bridge)

== Route ==
=== From the Humber to the Tees ===
Cade's Road began at Brough on the north bank of the River Humber, where there was a ferry, a Roman fort and civilian settlement (Petuaria) alongside a major Celtic settlement. The road ran northwards through Thorpe le Street and Market Weighton, before gradually turning westwards (possibly following the line of another Roman road) until it reached York (Roman Eboracum). From York it continued northwards to Thornton-le-Street near Thirsk and on to cross the River Tees (on a stone bridge now gone, but stones of which are incorporated into local buildings) near Middleton St George and Middleton One Row, where 'Pounteys Lane' is possibly named after the Roman Pons Tees (Bridge of Tees).

=== From the Tees to the Tyne ===
From the Tees the road heads north through Sadberge and then Great Stainton (also known as Stainton-le-Street) near Sedgefield. The route of the road in the Durham area is unknown, but it is thought the road passed east of Durham City, crossing the River Wear at Kepier. The road ran past the Roman fort of Concangis, located at Chester-le-Street. Concangis is the only known Roman fort on the road between York and Newcastle.

From Concangis the road headed north through Birtley to Wrekenton, once a village but now a suburb of Gateshead. From Wrekenton, a branch road, known as the Wrekendyke, headed north-east to the Roman fort and harbour of Arbeia at South Shields. It has been conjectured that the site of a Roman fort exists on the golf course at Wrekenton, but this has never been confirmed.

Cade's Road continued north from Wrekenton along Gateshead High Street and crossed the Tyne over the Roman bridge of Pons Aelius (Newcastle upon Tyne). It is not believed that the road continued north of Hadrian's Wall.

== See also ==
- Roman roads in Britain
- Roman Britain
