= Bishopstone =

Bishopstone, a place name meaning 'Bishop's estate', may refer to:

== Places ==
England

- Bishopstone, Buckinghamshire
- Bishopstone, East Sussex
- Bishopstone, Herefordshire
- Bishopstone, Salisbury, Wiltshire
- Bishopstone, Swindon, Wiltshire

== People ==
- Cyril Asquith, Baron Asquith of Bishopstone (1890–1954), English judge and law lord

== See also ==
- Bishopston (disambiguation)
- Bishopton (disambiguation)
