= Petuaria =

Roman fort at Brough in Yorkshire, England

Coordinates: 53.728°N 0.576°W

Petuaria (or Petuaria Parisorum) was originally a Roman fort situated where the town of Brough in the East Riding of Yorkshire now stands. Petuaria means something like 'quarter' or 'fourth part', incorporating the archaic Brythonic *petuar, 'four' (compare modern Welsh pedwar).

It was founded in 70 AD and abandoned in about 125. The adjacent civitas (civil town), ferry-crossing and (attested) port which grew over and replaced the fort survived until about 370, and was probably the capital of the Celtic tribe called the Parisi. Petuaria marked the southern end of the Roman road known now as Cade's Road, which ran roughly northwards for a hundred miles to Pons Aelius (modern day Newcastle upon Tyne). The section from Petuaria to Eboracum (York) was also the final section of Ermine Street.

== Archaeology ==
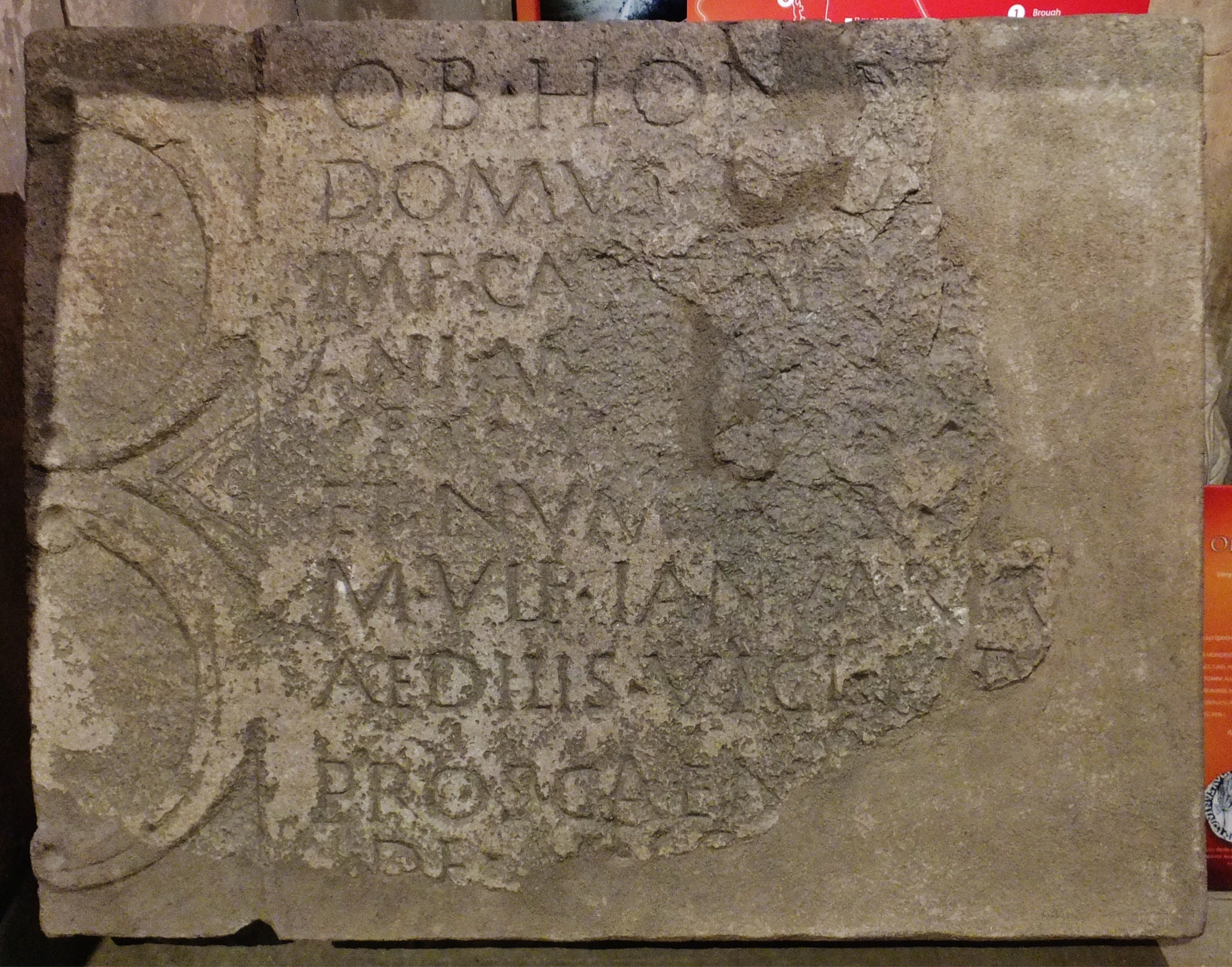
Dedication stone of the Roman Theatre, on display in the Hull and East Riding Museum

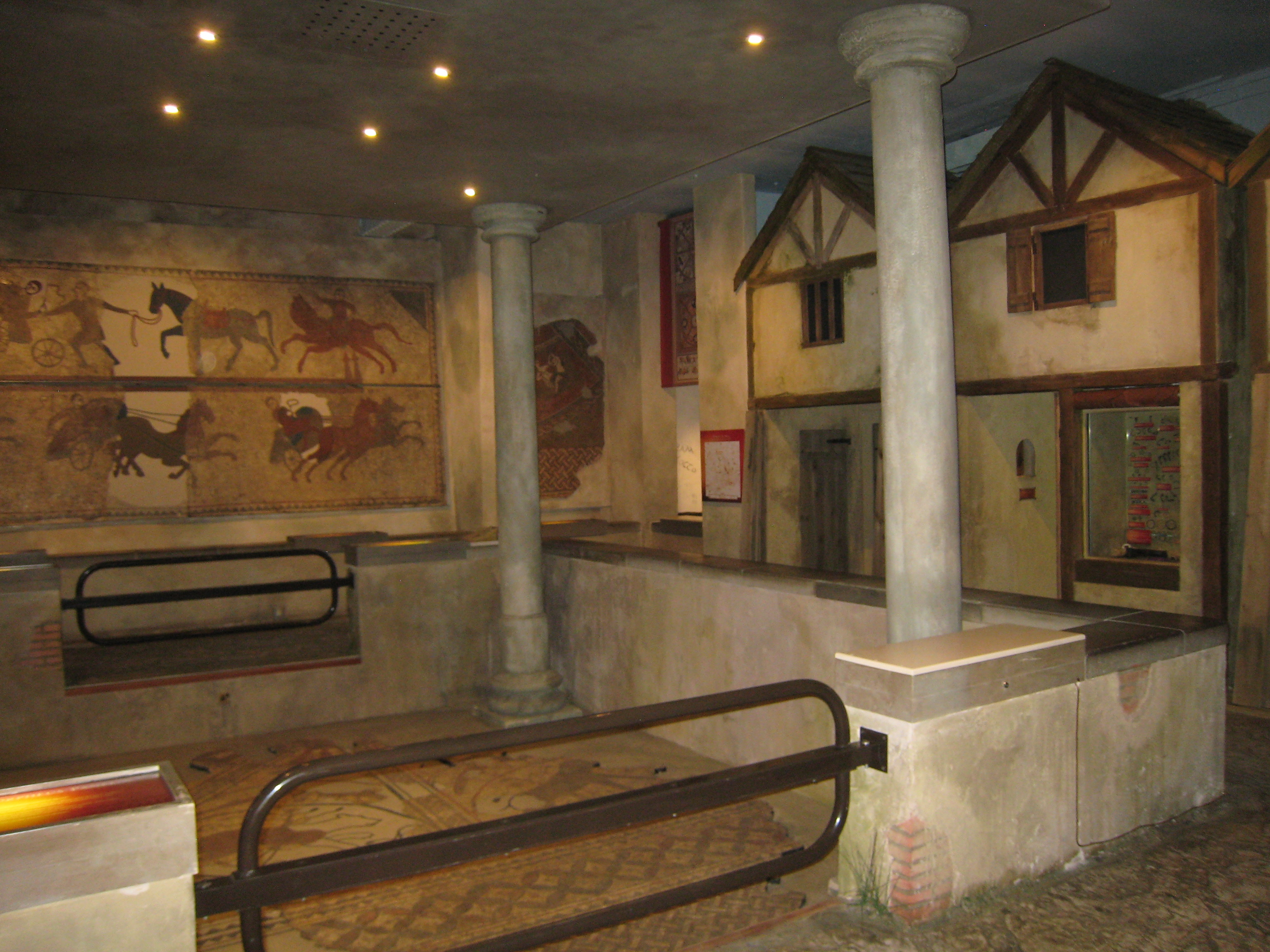
Part of a reconstruction of Petuaria in the Hull and East Riding Museum

Archaeological excavations of the site of Petuaria were carried out in the 1930s (one of the archaeologists was Mary Kitson Clark), and between 1958 and 1962, with occasional examinations of isolated areas since. The dedication stone of the Roman theatre was among the most significant finds and is unusual as the only recorded epigraphic mention of a magistrate in Roman Britain. Recording the gift of a proscenium stage to the civic settlement at Petuaria by a man called Marcus Ulpius Januarius, it has been dated to the reign of the Emperor Antoninus Pius and around 140 A.D.

His inscription was found re-used in the later stonework defences of Petuaria and gives a clear illustration of the standard of civic works and also civil and literary society which at one time existed in or around Roman Brough, at a tiny town whose modern magistrates court was only recently closed in the late 1990s, so ending nearly two thousand years of locally recorded justice unprecedented anywhere else in the British Isles. Their re-use of the Januarius stone also reveals how much, after two hundred years, the priorities of those living in East Yorkshire had changed in the later Roman Empire, at a time when it has been said that the two major preoccupations of the local people of the time were “floods and raids”, the latter coming mainly across the North Sea from Northern Europe.

== Importance ==
Roman Petuaria seems a genuine precursor to the strategic importance now held by the modern port city of Kingston upon Hull, founded in the Middle Ages. For anyone travelling by boats of shallow draught, the Humber is still a gateway into much of England east of the Pennines. Eight major rivers can be accessed from the North Sea through the estuary: the Ouse, Hull, Derwent, Wharfe, Aire, Don, Trent and Ancholme. That is why eight river goddesses who are shown reclining on the great mosaic from nearby Brantingham Roman villa are sometimes interpreted as representing the practical importance of these English rivers in Roman times for transport and travel.

== Brantingham villa ==
The nearby villa at Brantingham, just outside Brough, was first discovered in 1941 and would have been closely associated with the Roman town until it burnt down some time in the mid-4th century AD. This Roman site attracted modern notoriety to Brough in 1948, when a team of archaeologists from the Hull and East Riding Museum prepared the first of a group of mosaic pavements found at the villa site (a working quarry since the Middle Ages) during the war, for removal. Overnight it was stolen and although the rest were safely recovered to the museum and are on display to this day, the missing first one has never been found.

== Sources ==
1. *Pevsner, Nikolaus; Neave, David (1995) [1972]. Yorkshire: York and the East Riding (2nd ed.). London: Penguin Books. ISBN 0-14-071061-2.

2. “Excavations at Brough on Humber 1958-1961” – J. Wacher 1964

3. “Brantingham Roman Villa: discoveries in 1962” – J. Liversedge; D.J. Smith and I.M. Stead.

4. “Britannia – A Journal of Romano-British and kindred studies” Volume 4, 1973

5. “Roman Mosaics in Britain: An Introduction to their schemes and a catalogue of paintings” – D.S. Neal 1981

6. “New Light on the Parisi: recent discoveries in Iron Age and Roman East Yorkshire” E. Riding Archaeological Society with University of Hull – editor P. Halkon 1989 (and subsequent editions)

7. “Brading, Brantingham and York: a new look at some fourth-century mosaics” – R. Ling “Britannia – A Journal of Romano-British and kindred studies” Volume 22, 1991.

8. “Roman Humberside” (2nd edn.) Humberside County Council Archaeology Unit: B. Sitch and A. Williams 1992

9. “Roman Mosaics of Britain: Volume I: Northern Britain incorporating the Midlands & East Anglia”: – D.S. Neal & S.R. Cosh ‘Society of Antiquaries of London’ 2002 Illuminata Publishers

10.“The Roman Mosaics at Hull” – D.S. Smith (3rd edition) 2005, M. Foreman and D. Crowther Hull & East Riding Museums & Art Gallery
