= Bishopton, County Durham =

Village in County Durham, England

Coordinates: 54.585278°N 1.437222°W

Bishopton
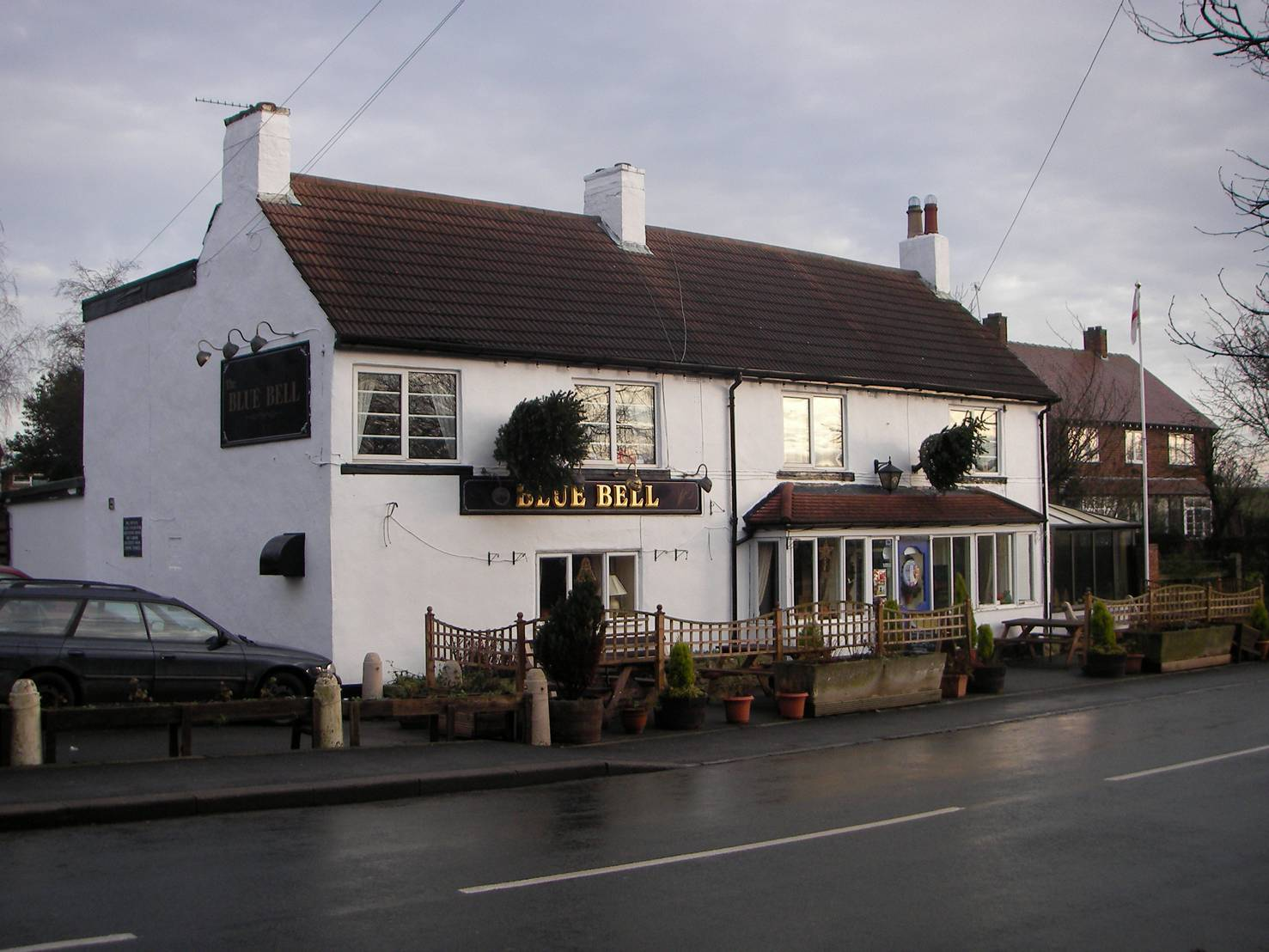
- The Blue Bell pub

- Location within County Durham
- Population: 366 (2011)
- OS grid reference: NZ365212
- Unitary authority: Darlington
- Ceremonial county: County Durham
- Region: North East
- Country: England
- Sovereign state: United Kingdom
- Post town: STOCKTON-ON-TEES
- Postcode district: TS21
- Dialling code: 01740
- Police: Durham
- Fire: County Durham and Darlington
- Ambulance: North East
- UK Parliament: Sedgefield

Bishopton is a village in the borough of Darlington and the ceremonial county of County Durham, England. It is situated to the west of Stockton-on-Tees. It originated as a farming community with rows of cottages and several farms forming a long wide village street, with an adjacent green. St Peter's Church stands at the centre of the village. The hamlet of Little Stainton and the town of Great Stainton were formerly part of the parish of Bishopton.

== Castle Hill ==
The earthworks of a motte-and-bailey fortification known as Castle Hill are situated 400m south of the village and west of Bishopton Beck which flows west of the town. The fortification, which is a Scheduled Ancient Monument, dates back to at least the 12th century, with a licence to crenellate having been granted in 1143 during the time of The Anarchy.

== Education ==
As of 2011 Bishopton Redmarshall CofE Primary School, which is situated in the north-west of the village, had 106 pupils, aged 4–11. In October 2006, Ofsted judged the school to be good and this rating was maintained in the June 2010 interim inspection. In August 2011 the school reopened as an Academy. As of September 2007, the school has been in a federation with Heighington CE Primary School.

== Religious sites ==
St Peter's Church, Bishopton, is an active Anglican parish church in the deanery of Stockton, the archdeaconry of Auckland, and the diocese of Durham. English Heritage has designated the church, as a Grade II listed building.

== Sport ==
South of the village there is a lake which was a former gravel pit and is now used as a windsurfing centre.

== Gallery ==
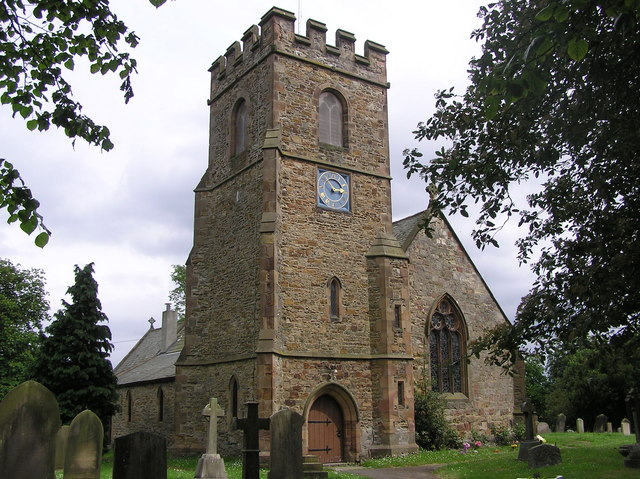
St Peters Church

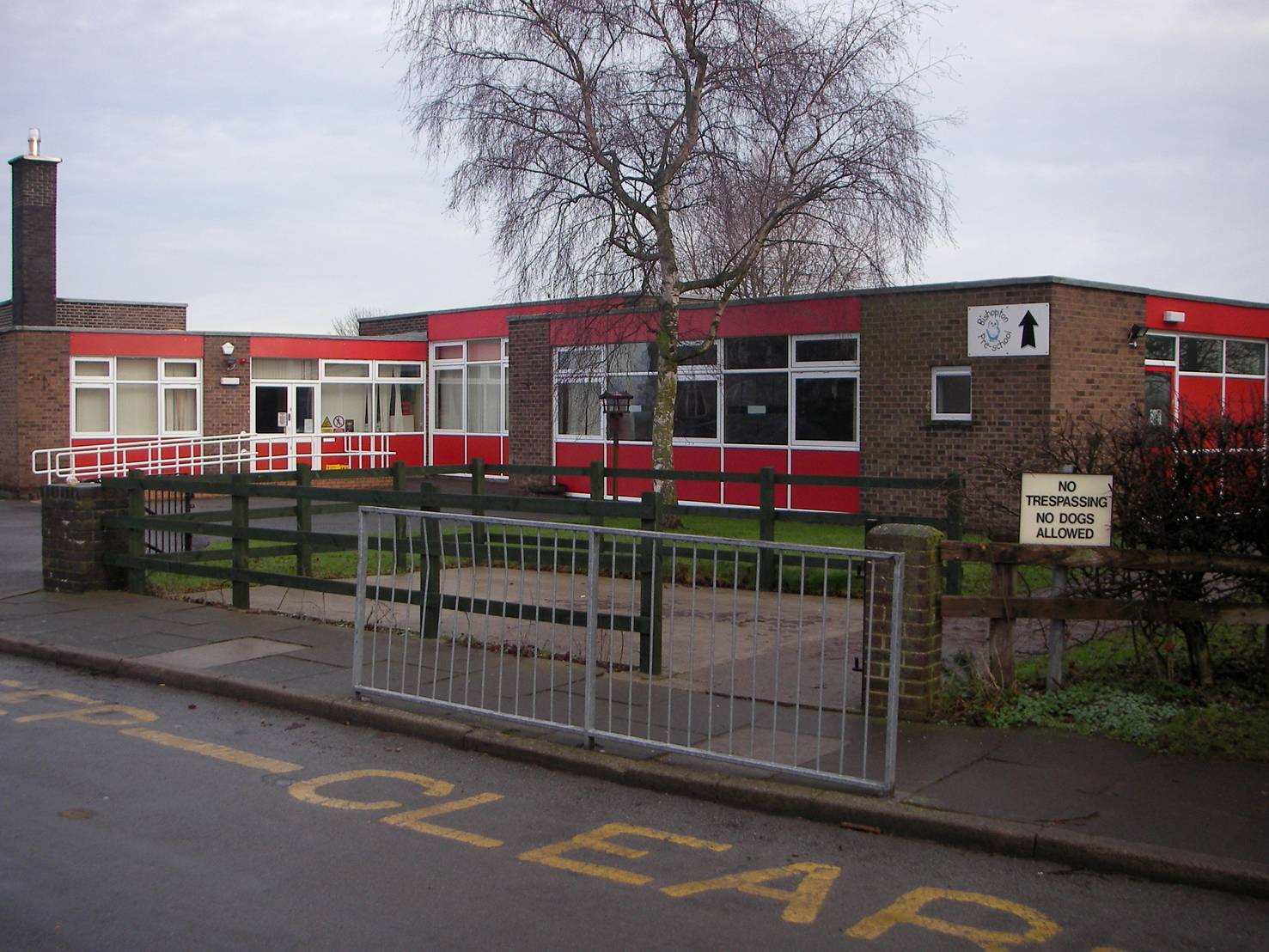
Bishopton/Redmarshall CofE Primary School

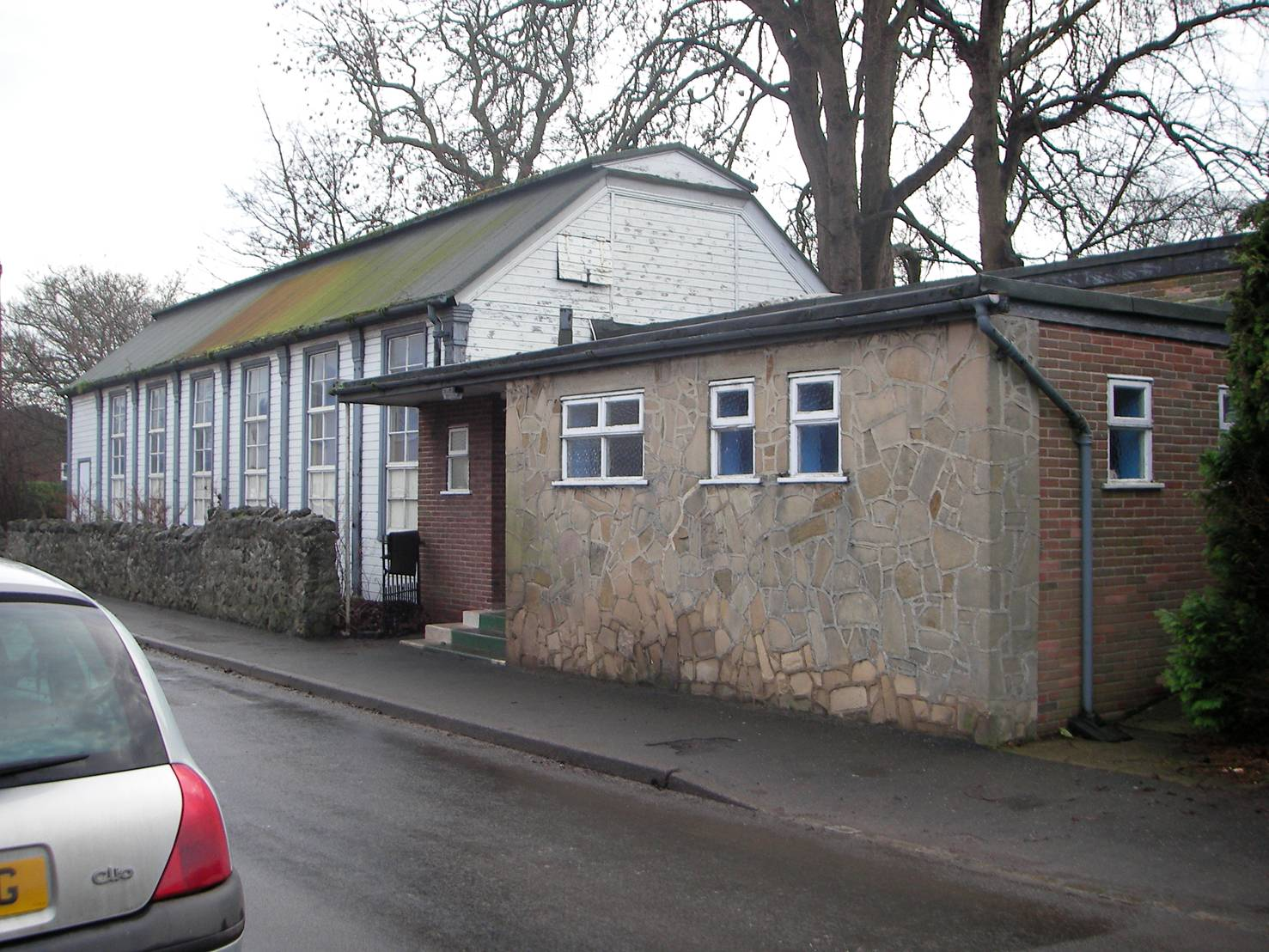
The village hall

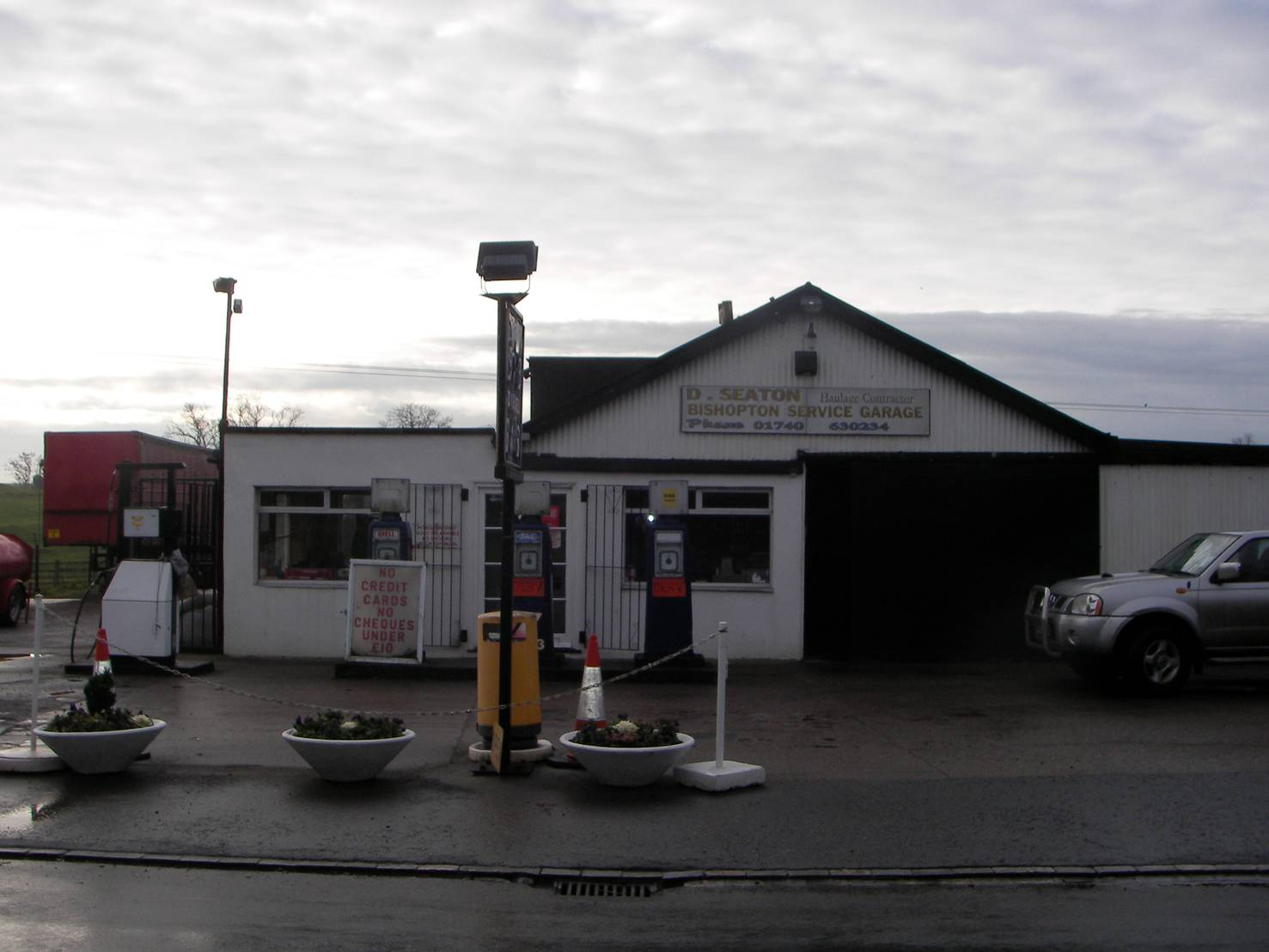
The local garage

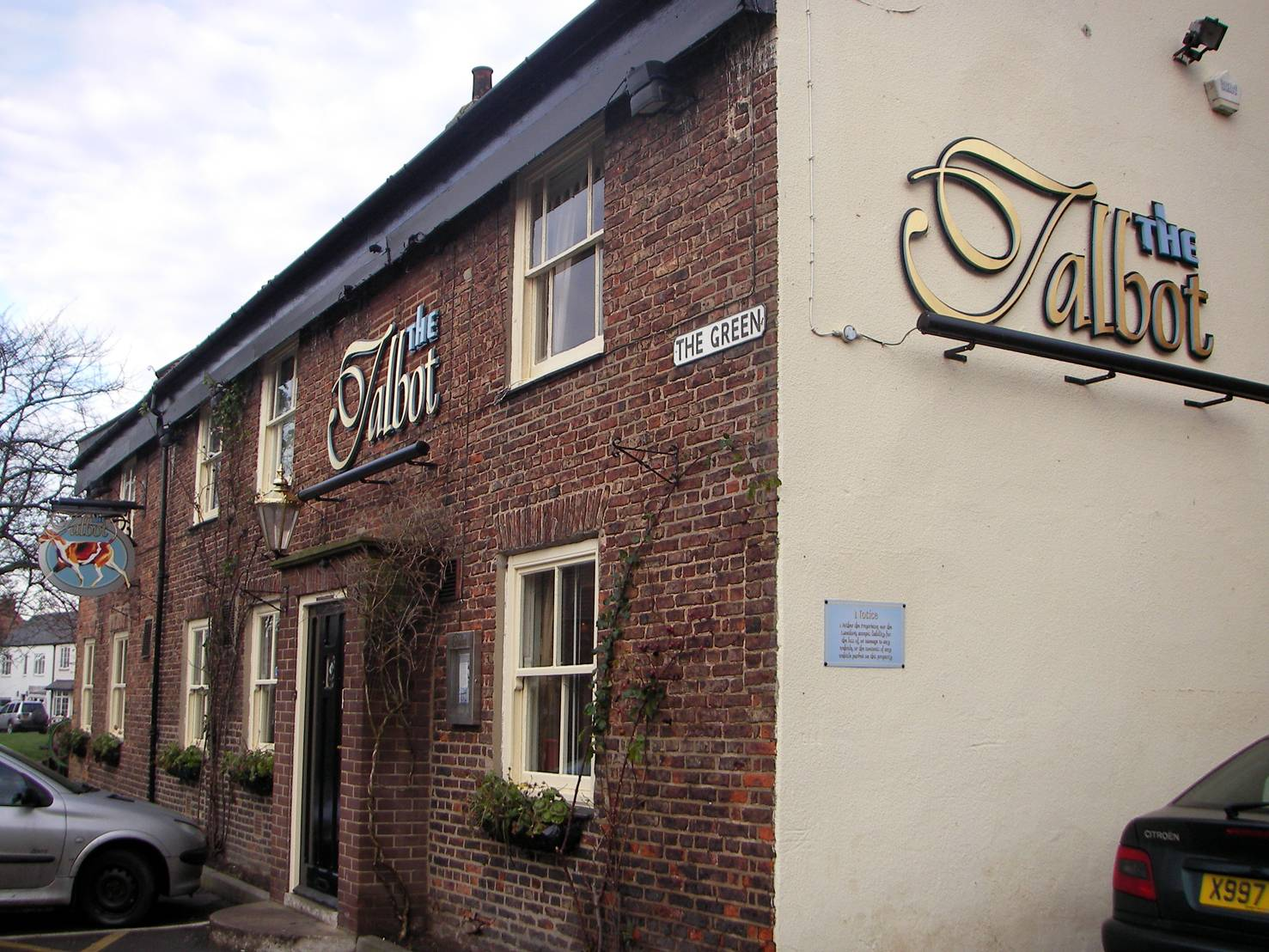
The Talbot

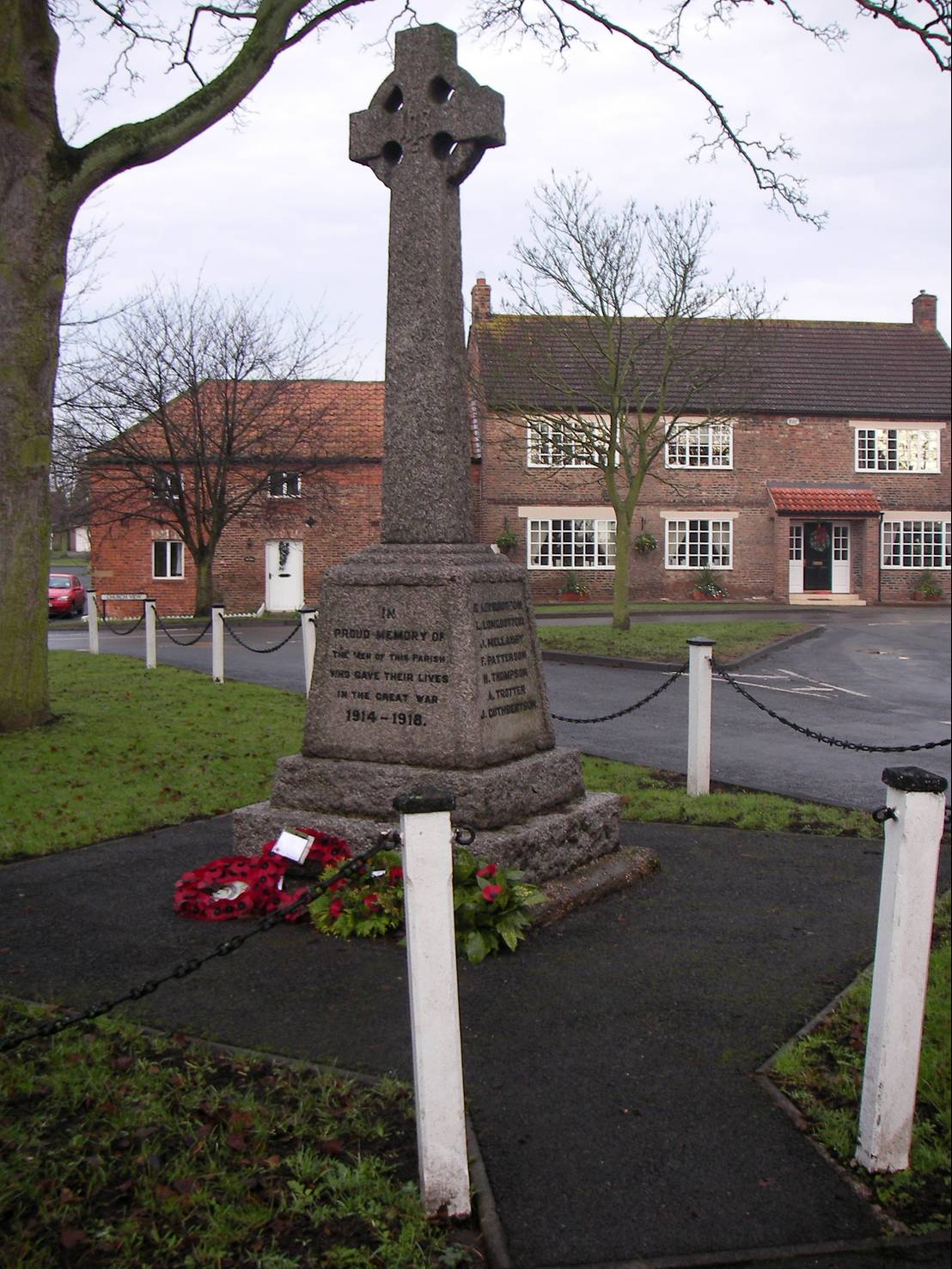
The Great War Memorial

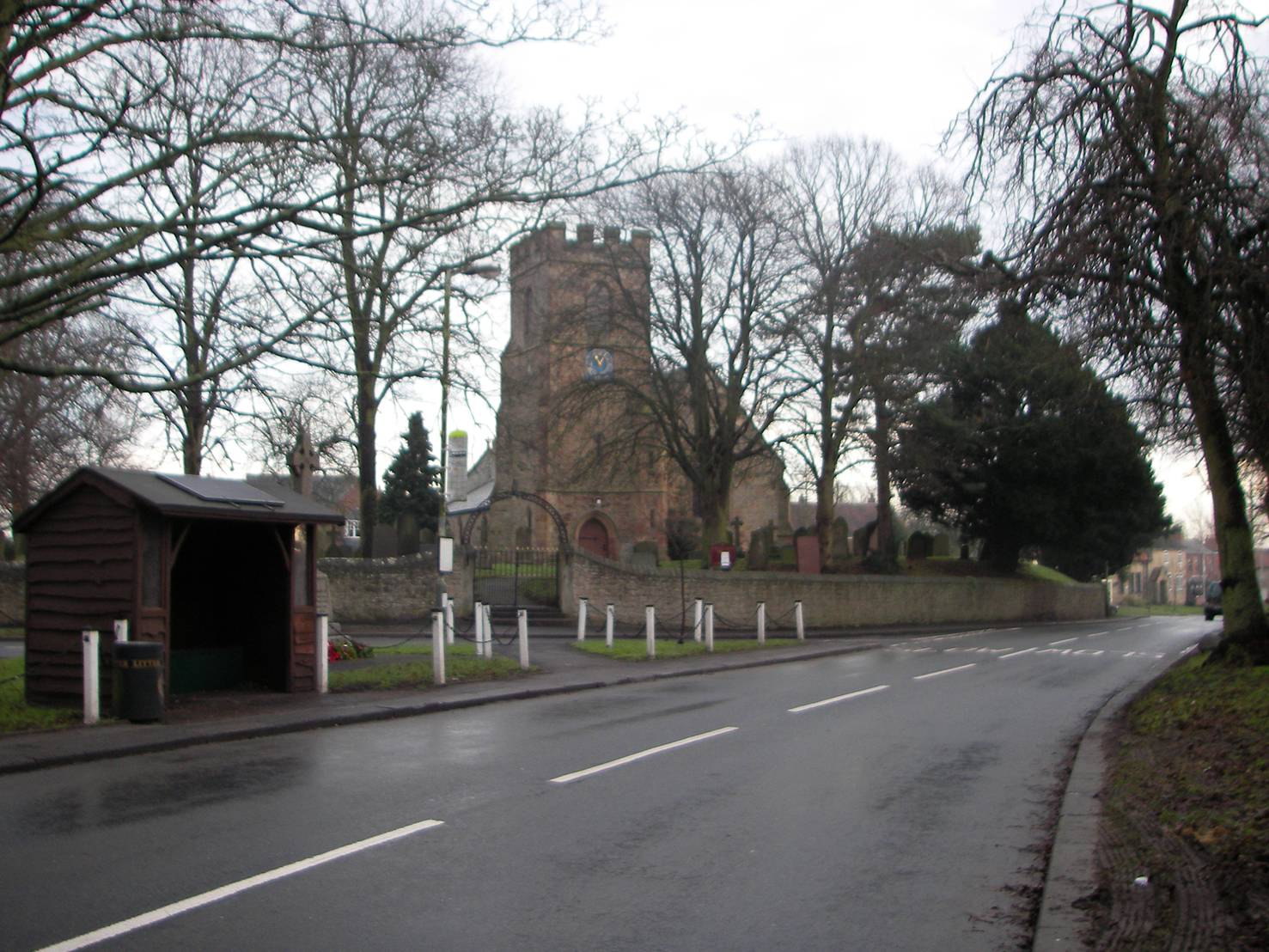
The bus stop, near to the church

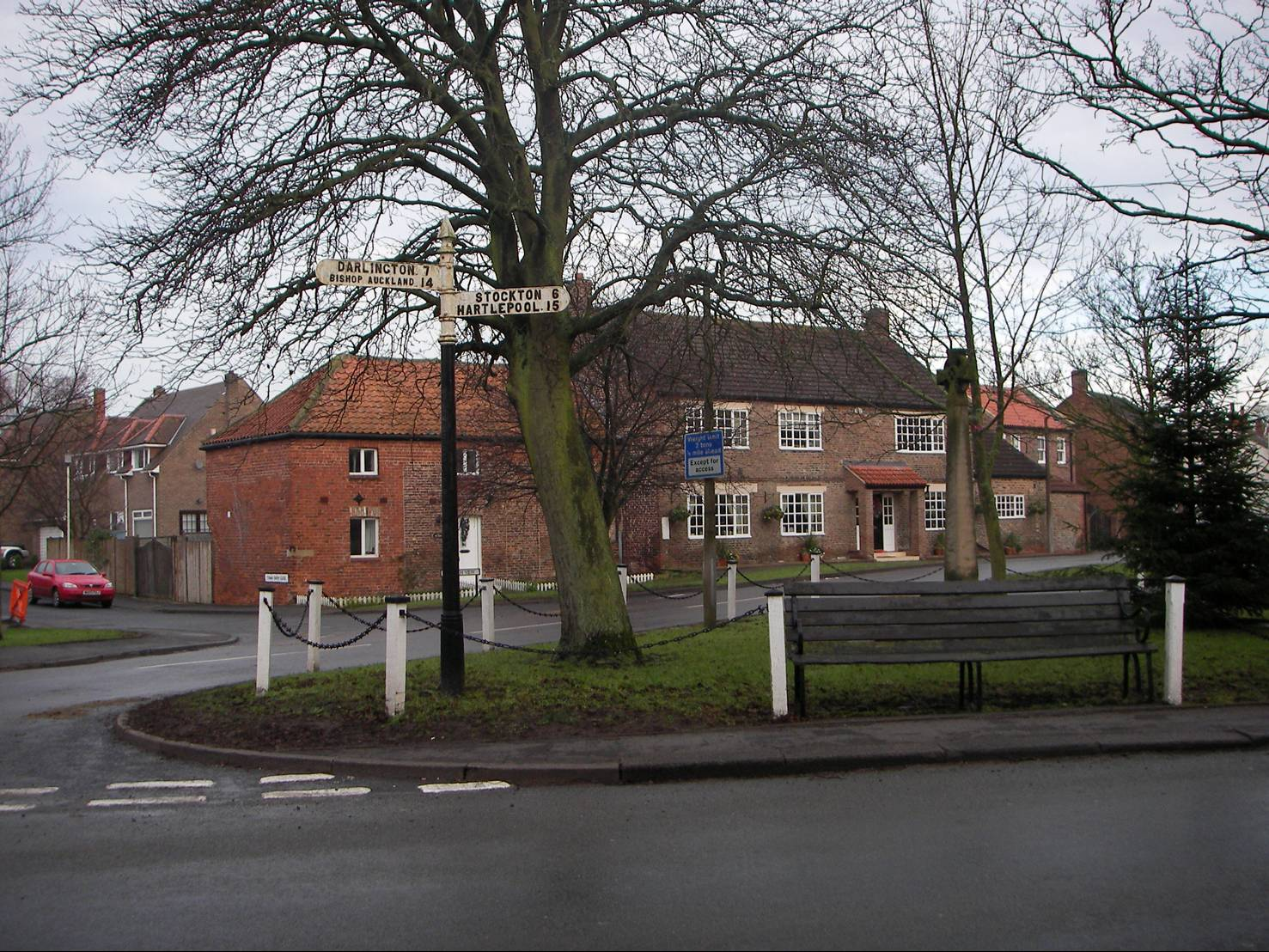
The bus stop bench and sign
