= Bishopston =

Bishopston may refer to:

== Places ==
England

- Bishopston, Bristol, a suburb and ward of the city of Bristol

Wales

- Bishopston, Swansea, a village
- Bishopston (Swansea ward), an electoral ward and community
- Bishopston, also known as Bishton, a village in the City of Newport

== People ==
- Edward Bishop, Baron Bishopston (1920–84), British politician

== See also ==
- Bishopton (disambiguation)
- Bishopstone (disambiguation)
