= Thorpe le Street =

Hamlet in the East Riding of Yorkshire, England

Coordinates: 53.886283°N 0.726693°W

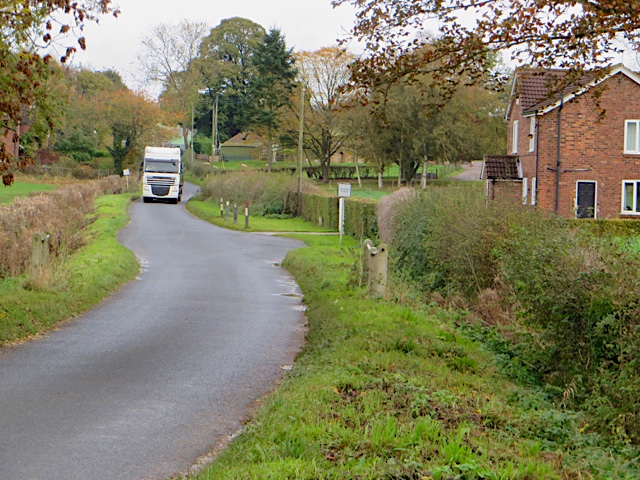
- Road through the settlement

- Location within the East Riding of Yorkshire
- OS grid reference: SE837440
- Civil parish: Hayton
- Unitary authority: East Riding of Yorkshire
- Ceremonial county: East Riding of Yorkshire
- Region: Yorkshire and the Humber
- Country: England
- Sovereign state: United Kingdom
- Post town: YORK
- Postcode district: YO42
- Dialling code: 01430
- Police: Humberside
- Fire: Humberside
- Ambulance: Yorkshire
- UK Parliament: Bridlington and The Wolds

Thorpe le Street is a hamlet and former civil parish, now in the parish of Hayton, in the East Riding of Yorkshire, England.

== Location ==
It is situated approximately 3.5 miles (5.6 km) south-east of the market town of Pocklington and 3 miles (4.8 km) north-west of the market town of Market Weighton. It lies to the south of the A1079 road. In 1931 the parish had a population of 28.

== History ==
Thorpe le Street was formerly a township in the parish of Nun-Burn-holme, in 1866 Thorpe le Street became a civil parish on 1 April 1935 the parish was abolished and merged with Hayton. The name Thorpe derives from the Old Norse þorp meaning 'secondary settlement'.The Roman Road known as Cade's Road is thought likely to have passed through it, which would explain "-le-Street".
