= The Castle, Newcastle =

11th-century English castle

- Newcastle upon Tyne
- Newcastle Castle Keep

Site information
- Type: Norman

Location
- Shown within Tyne and Wear
- Coordinates: 54°58′08″N 1°36′38″W

Site history
- Built: 1177
- Built by: Henry II

The Castle, Newcastle, or Newcastle Castle is a medieval fortification in Newcastle upon Tyne, England, built on the site of the fortress that gave the City of Newcastle its name. The most prominent remaining structures on the site are the Castle Keep (the castle's main fortified stone tower, pictured below right), and the Black Gate, its fortified gatehouse.

Use of the site for defensive purposes dates from Roman times, when it housed a fort and settlement called Pons Aelius (meaning 'bridge of (Publius) Aelius (Hadrianus)' – the Roman emperor Hadrian) – guarding a bridge over the River Tyne. Robert Curthose, eldest son of William the Conqueror, in 1080 built a wooden motte-and-bailey-style castle on the site of the Roman fort. Curthose built this 'New Castle upon Tyne' after he returned south from a campaign against Malcolm III of Scotland. Henry II built the stone Castle Keep between 1172 and 1177 on the site of Curthose's castle. Henry III added the Black Gate between 1247 and 1250. Nothing remains above ground of the Roman fort or the original motte-and-bailey castle. The Keep is a Grade I listed building, and a scheduled monument.

The Castle Keep and Black Gate pre-date the construction of the Newcastle town wall, construction of which started around 1265, and did not include it. The site of the keep is in the centre of Newcastle and lies to the east of Newcastle station. The 75-foot (23 m) gap between the keep and the gatehouse is almost entirely filled by the railway viaduct that carries the East Coast Main Line from Newcastle to Scotland.

The keep and Black Gate are now managed by the Old Newcastle Project under the Heart of the City Partnership as one combined visitor attraction, "Newcastle Castle".

== Early history ==
In the mid-2nd century, the Romans built the first bridge to cross the River Tyne at the place where Newcastle now stands. The bridge was called Pons Aelius or 'Bridge of Aelius', Aelius being the family name of the Emperor Hadrian, who instigated the building of Hadrian's Wall along the Tyne-Solway Gap. The Romans built a fort to protect the river crossing which was at the foot of the Tyne Gorge. The fort was situated on a rocky outcrop overlooking the new bridge. Hadrian's Wall crossed from west to east just north of the Roman fort, somewhere between the two medieval stone monuments of Newcastle Castle and Newcastle Cathedral. It is thought likely that the Wall descended (or ascended) the sloping street called the Side, just to the north of the Black Gate of the castle, described below.

At some unknown time in the Anglo-Saxon age, the site of Newcastle came to be known as Monkchester, suggesting a monastery at a location still unknown. In the late 7th century, a cemetery was established on the site of the Roman fort.

== Norman castle ==
In 1080, the Norman king, William I, sent his eldest son, Robert Curthose, north to defend the kingdom against the Scots. After his campaign, he moved to Monkchester and began the building of a 'New Castle'. This was of the "motte-and-bailey" type of construction, a wooden tower on top of an earthen mound (motte), surrounded by a moat and wooden stockade (bailey).

In 1095, Robert de Mowbray, Earl of Northumbria, rose up against William Rufus and Rufus sent an army north to crush the revolt and to capture the castle. From then on the castle became crown property and was an important base from which the king could control the northern barons.

== New stone castle ==
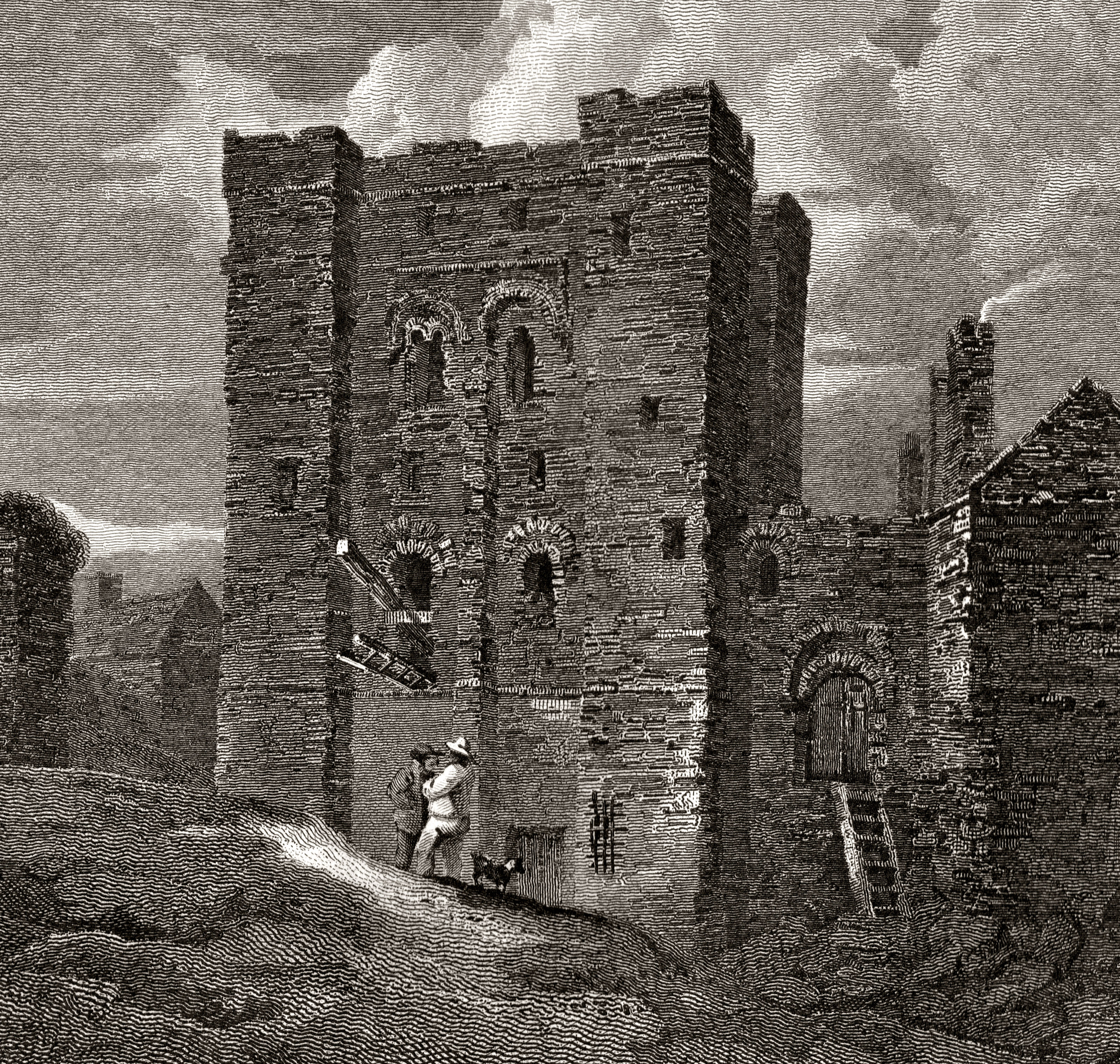
The unrestored castle in 1814.

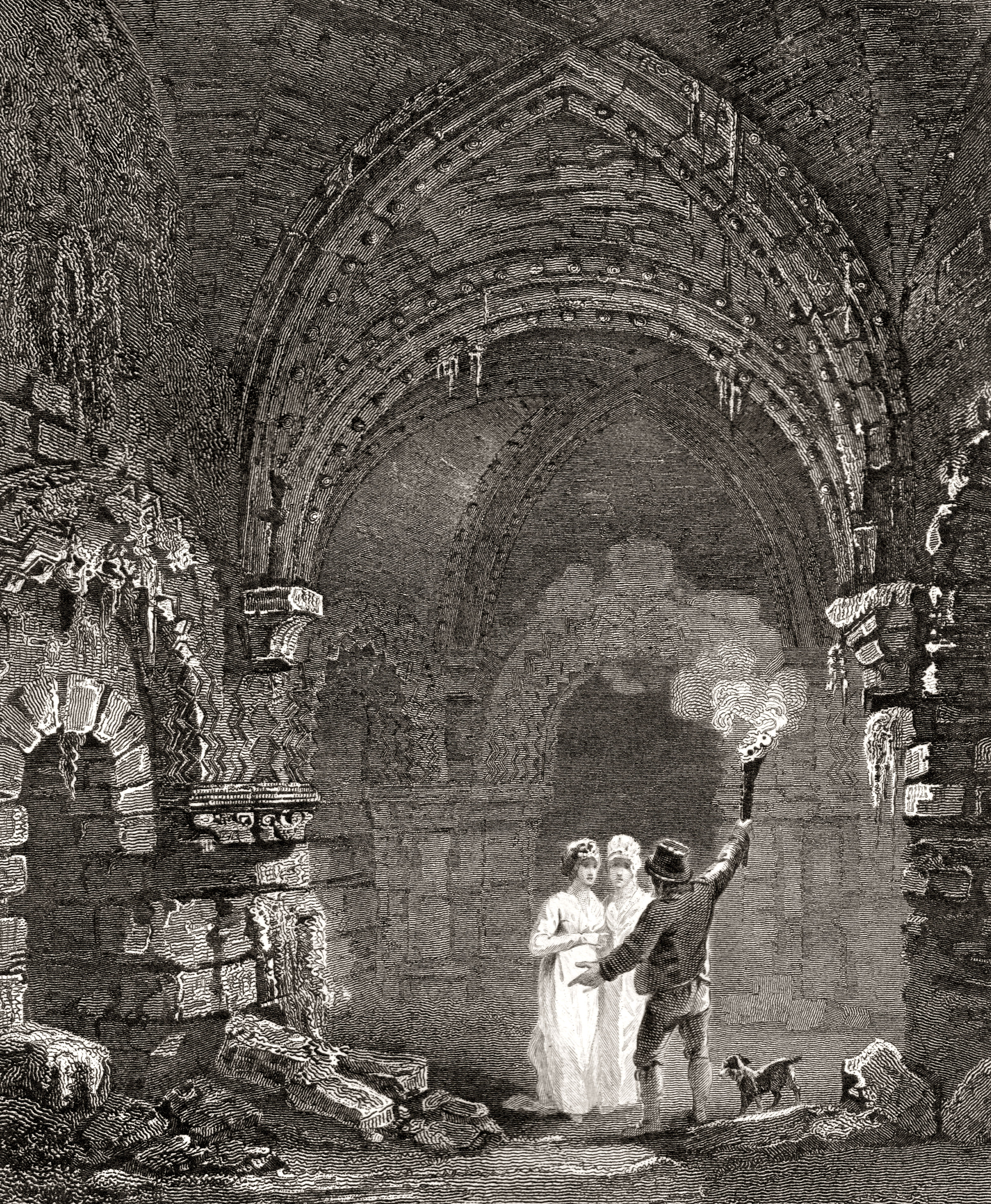
A view of the ornately-carved castle chapel in 1814.

Not a trace of the tower or mound of the motte-and-bailey castle remains now. Henry II replaced it with a rectangular stone keep, commissioned in 1168, which was built between 1172 and 1177 at a cost of £1,144. A stone bailey, in the form of a triangle, replaced the previous wooden one. The master mason or architect, Maurice, also built Dover Castle. The great outer gateway to the castle, called 'the Black Gate', was built later, between 1247 and 1250, in the reign of Henry III. During the civil wars at the end of King John's reign, it was under the control of Philip of Oldcoates.

Additional protection to the castle was provided late in the 13th century when stone walls were constructed, with towers, to enclose the town. The safety provided by the town walls led to the neglect of the fabric of the castle. In 1589, during the reign of Queen Elizabeth I the castle was described as being ruinous. From the early 17th century onward, this situation was made worse by the construction of shops and houses on much of the site.

== English Civil War ==
In 1643, during the English Civil War, the Royalist Mayor of Newcastle, Sir John Marley, repaired the keep and probably also refortified the castle. In 1644 the Scottish army crossed the border in support of the Parliamentarians and the Scottish troops besieged Newcastle for three months until the garrison surrendered. The town walls were extensively damaged and the final forces to surrender on 19 October 1644 did so from the Castle keep.

During the 16th to the 18th century, the keep was used as a prison. By 1800, there were a large number of houses within the boundaries of the castle.

== Nineteenth century ==
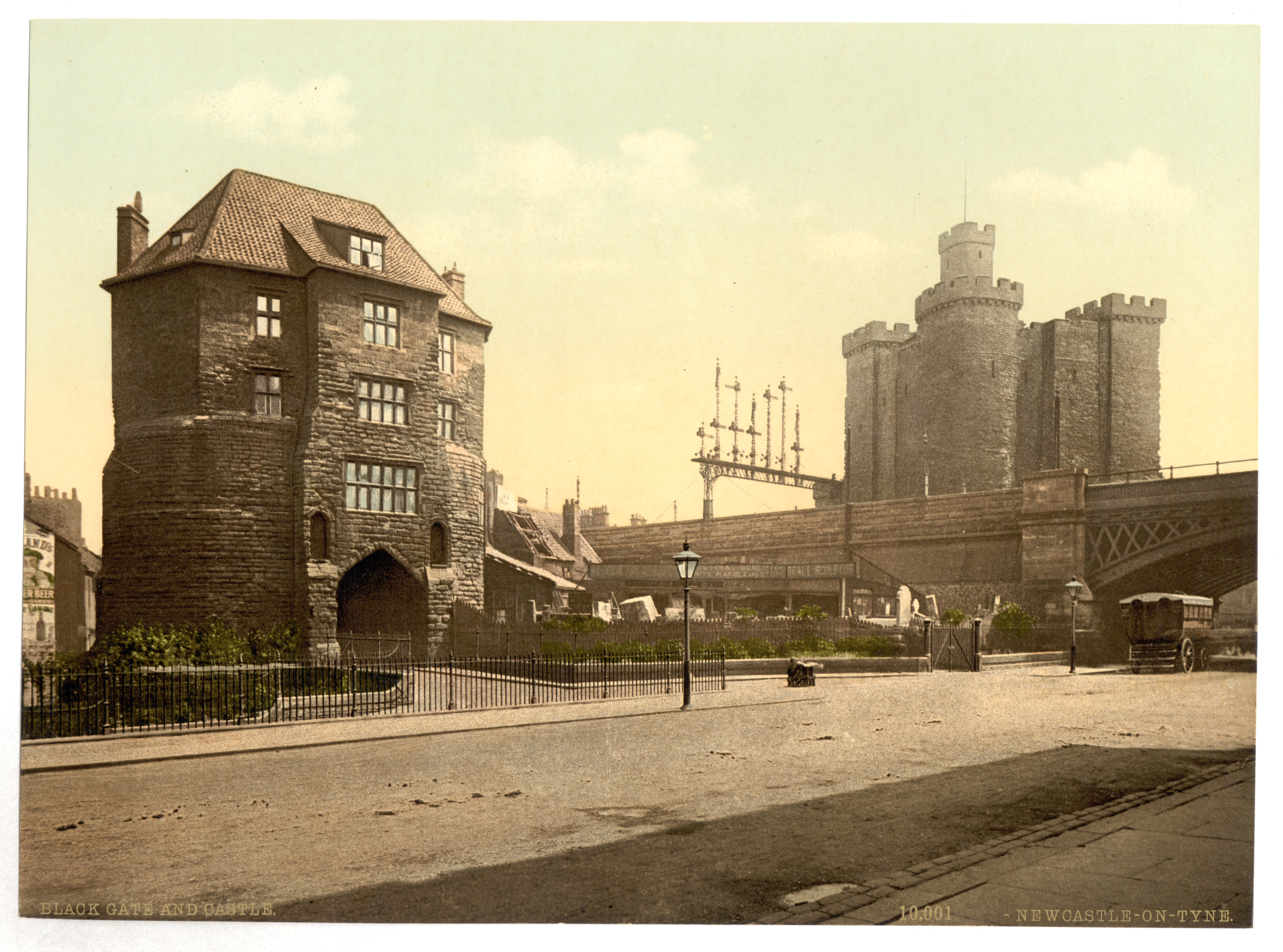
The Black Gate and Castle Keep circa 1890–1900, showing the mid nineteenth century railway viaduct bisecting the site. The slum buildings to the rear of the Black Gate have since been demolished.

In 1809, Newcastle Corporation bought the keep and provided it with a new roof and battlements. In addition the private dwellings within the castle boundaries were demolished. The keep was restored in 1810, 1812 and 1848. In the mid 19th century the arrival of the railway in Newcastle led to a large viaduct being constructed to the north of the keep, crossing the site of the castle. As a result, only the keep and the Black Gate now remain.

== Twentieth century ==
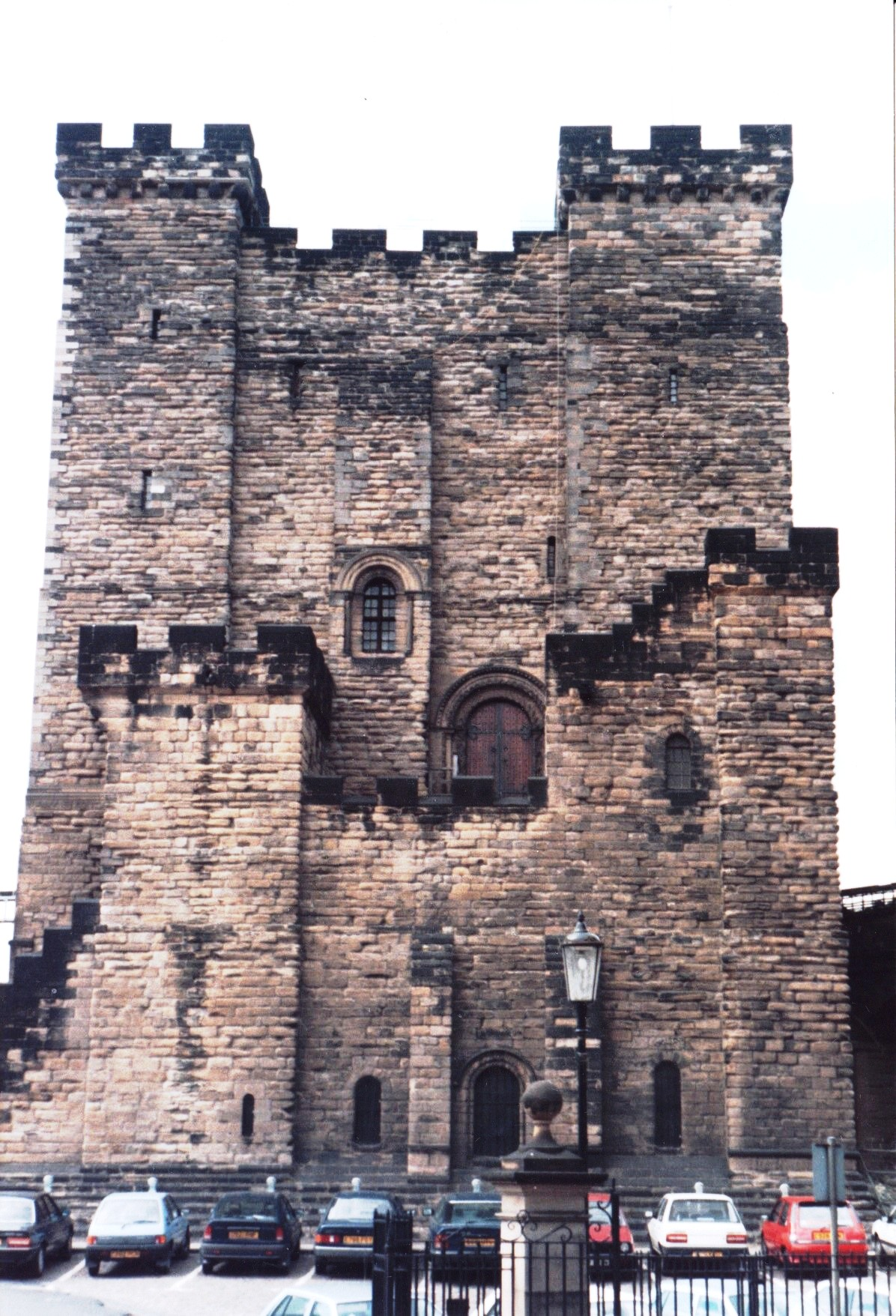
Newcastle Keep in 1991

The keep was restored between the 1960s and 1980s when crumbling outside stonework was replaced and the interior cleaned.

== The Black Gate ==
The Black Gate, a barbican that became the main castle entrance, seen from the west. An external lift has now been added on its north side (out of the picture to the left behind the gateway) to improve access. The road at left is the Side, on the probable line of Hadrian's Wall.

The "Black Gate" was added to Newcastle Castle between 1247 and 1250, forming an additional barbican in front of the earlier north gate of the castle. It consisted of two towers with a passage running between them. On either side of the passage was a vaulted guardroom. There was a drawbridge at the front (facing west) and another at the rear. There was also a portcullis which could be raised and lowered to seal the entrance passage.

The original building would probably have had a flat roof, but in 1618 James I leased the gatehouse to a courtier, Alexander Stephenson. Stephenson substantially altered the gatehouse, rebuilding the upper floors. Stephenson then let the Black Gate out to various tenants, one of whom was a merchant, named Patrick Black. It was he who gave his name to the Black Gate.

Back of the Black Gate

Eventually houses were built along both sides of the passageway, and one part of the building became a public house. By the early part of the nineteenth century, the Black Gate had become a slum tenement, housing up to sixty people.

The Black Gate was leased to the Society of Antiquaries of Newcastle upon Tyne in the 1880s, which extensively restored it between 1883 and 1885. It was the Society that added the top floor and pitched roof. The Society had a museum and held regular meetings there until relatively recently; the Bagpipe Museum that was there was moved north to become the Morpeth Chantry Bagpipe Museum in 1987. The drawbridges to the front and rear of the Black Gate have been replaced by wooden footbridges.

== Current building ==
The Keep is a Grade I listed building, and a scheduled monument. It is a roughly square building, measuring 62 feet (19 m) by 56 feet (17 m) and 81 feet (25 m) tall. The entrance leads via flights of stairs to the second floor and into the Great Hall, the largest room in the keep, measuring 30 feet (9.1 m) by 24 feet (7.3 m). The Black Gate was approached via a drawbridge across a moat. A wooden bridge has replaced the drawbridge. The original gate had a portcullis, and the recesses where this fitted can still be seen. The keep is currently owned by Newcastle City Council and managed by the Heart of the City Partnership.

The Castle Keep can be visited today. The keep is also notable in having the main East Coast railway line running through the centre of the grounds. In particular, the battlements offer fine views over the River Tyne quayside, the cathedral and Newcastle station. The castle is reputedly haunted, and has been subject to many paranormal investigations. It featured in an episode of Most Haunted.

The Castle Keep and the Black Gate have recently been refurbished by the Heart of the City partnership, and reopened on 21 March 2015 as Newcastle Castle. In addition to improved accessibility via an external lift to the Black Gate, new additions include an education centre, reception/gift shop and museum room in the Black Gate and audio-visual installations in the Castle Keep, telling the story of the site and the people who have lived there over the centuries.

== See also ==
- Castles in Great Britain and Ireland
- List of castles in England
- Newcastle Castle, Bridgend
