= John Cade (antiquarian) =

English tradesman and antiquarian (1734–1806)

John Cade (1734–1806) was an English tradesman and antiquary. Retiring from business, he took up the study of Roman remains around County Durham, putting forward hypotheses of reconstruction of Roman roads, in particular, that were controversial.

== Life ==
Cade was born in January 1734, at Darlington, where he was educated at Darlington grammar school. Entering a wholesale linendraper's firm in London, he was promoted as head of the counting-house, and subsequently became a partner in a branch of the concern at Dublin.

Cade retired from business, with an independent financial position. He died at Gainford 10 December 1806, and was buried at Darlington.

== Works ==
Cade corresponded with Thomas Reynolds, Richard Kaye and Richard Gough; but was strongly controverted by William Hutchinson. Not a member of the Society of Antiquaries of London, he contributed papers to Archæologia, their journal. These included:

- Conjectures concerning some undescribed Roman Roads and other Antiquities in the County of Durham, vii. 74, an attempt to trace Icknield Street in County Durham;
- A Letter from Rev. Dr. Sharp, Archdeacon of Northumberland, to Mr. Cade, vii. 82;
- Conjectures on the name of the Roman Station Vinovium or Binchester, ix. 276; and
- Some Observations on the Roman Station of Cataractonium, with an account of the Antiquities in the neighbourhood of Piersbridge and Gainford; in a letter to Richard Gough, Esq., x. 54.

Cade collected illustrations for a copy of Edmund Gibson's edition of William Camden's Britannia, and supplied Gough with many corrections for his edition. He sent John Nichols Some Conjectures on the Formation of Peat-mosses in the mountainous parts of the Counties of Durham, Northumberland, printed in the Gentleman's Magazine, lix. 967.

== Notes ==
Attribution

This article incorporates text from a publication now in the public domain: Stephen, Leslie, ed. (1886). "Cade, John (1734-1806)". Dictionary of National Biography. Vol. 8. London: Smith, Elder & Co.
