= Domitia Paulina Major =

Roman aristocrat and mother of Hadrian

- DOMITIA PAVLINA
- Other names: Domitia Paulina
- Citizenship: Roman
- Era: Roman Empire
- Known for: mother of Roman emperor Hadrian
- Spouse: Publius Aelius Hadrianus Afer
- Children: Hadrian; Aelia Domitia Paulina

Domitia Paulina, also known as Domitia Paulina the Elder (in Latin: Domitia Paulina Maior), was a Roman aristocrat and mother of the Roman emperor Hadrian.

== Biography ==
Paulina was born in Gades (modern-day Cadiz). She is believed to have come from a Romanized native family. Paulina married the senator Publius Aelius Hadrianus Afer, who attained the rank of praetor and was a cousin of emperor Trajan. From this marriage were born Domitia Paulina the Younger and Publius Aelius Hadrianus, the future emperor Hadrian. After their father's death between 24 January 85 and 24 January 86, the children were placed under the guardianship of Trajan and the officer Publius Acilius Attianus.

Domitia Paulina may have already passed away by this time. However, a fragment of papyrus from Bakchias in the Egyptian Faiyum, called P.Fay 19, apparently contains, as a writing exercise, a letter from Hadrian to his successor and adopted son Antoninus Pius. In the few preserved lines, which show autobiographical traits, Hadrian, preparing for his imminent death, reports as a "scribe" that his father died at the age of forty and that he himself had reached about the age of his mother, who, according to conjecture based on a lacuna in the papyrus, died at sixty. Hadrian was born in 76, so his mother's birth must be placed between 45 and 60. In that case, she would have lived until the early 2nd century. However, the significance and value of this papyrus are uncertain and must be considered with caution.

Unlike her daughter, Domitia Paulina is never mentioned in inscriptions, but she is the recipient of a letter attributed to Hadrian, preserved in the Hermeneumata Leidensia, a 3rd-century Greco-Latin schoolbook. In this letter, the author praises his mother's piety and modesty and prays that all his actions may be worthy of her praise.
