= Bishopstone, Herefordshire =

Village in Herefordshire, England

Coordinates: 52.084°N 2.848°W

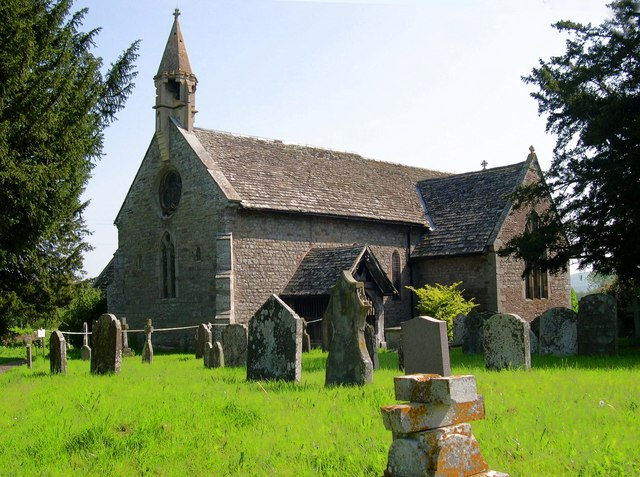
St Lawrence, Bishopstone

Bishopstone is a village and civil parish in Herefordshire, England, 10 km (6.2 mi) west of Hereford, near the River Wye and the Roman town of Magnis. According to the 2001 census, it had a population of 199, increasing to 208 at the 2011 census.
