= Derventio =

Derventio is a Britto-Roman name, but of Celtic origin (dervo- "oak-tree"), and refers to one of the following Roman sites in Roman Britain :

- Derventio (Papcastle), the Roman fort and settlement at Papcastle near Cockermouth, Cumbria
- Derventio Brigantum, a Roman fort and settlement beneath Malton, North Yorkshire
- Derventio Coritanorum, the Roman fort and settlement at Little Chester, Derbyshire
- Stamford Bridge, East Riding of Yorkshire, the site of the Roman fort Derventio near York
