= St Peter's Church, Bishopton =

Coordinates: 54.5851°N 1.4364°W

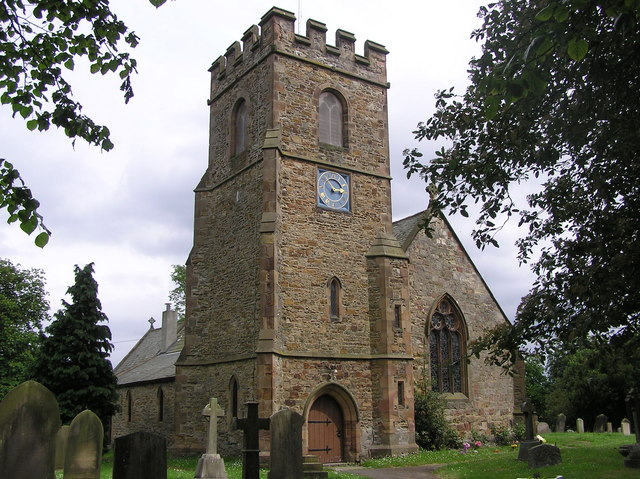
- St Peter's Church, Bishopton, from the northwest

- Location in County Durham
- OS grid reference: NZ 365 212
- Location: High Street, Bishopton, County Durham
- Country: England
- Denomination: Anglican
- Website: Stockton Country Parishes

History
- Status: Parish church
- Dedication: Saint Peter

Architecture
- Functional status: Active
- Heritage designation: Grade II
- Designated: 27 January 1988
- Architect: Sharpe and Paley
- Architectural type: Church
- Style: Gothic, Gothic Revival
- Groundbreaking: 13th century (probable)
- Completed: 1847

Specifications
- Materials: Sandstone with some limestone, slate roofs

Administration
- Province: York
- Diocese: Durham
- Archdeaconry: Auckland
- Deanery: Stockton
- Parish: Bishopton

Clergy
- Vicar: Rev David Brooke

St Peter's Church is in the village of Bishopton, County Durham, England. It is an active Anglican parish church in the deanery of Stockton, the archdeaconry of Auckland, and the diocese of Durham. The church is recorded in the National Heritage List for England as a designated Grade II listed building.

== History ==
The church dates probably from the 13th century. In 1846–47 it was largely rebuilt by the Lancaster architects Sharpe and Paley, who also added the north aisle and the tower.

== Architecture ==
St Peter's is constructed in sandstone, with some limestone in the chancel, and has green slate roofs. Its plan consists of a three-bay nave with a north aisle and a tower at its west end, and a two-bay chancel with an organ chamber to its north. The tower is in three stages and has a west door, diagonal buttresses, and a polygonal stair turret at the southwest corner. On its west side is a clock face, and the top stage contains two-light bell openings. The tower is surmounted by a battlemented parapet. A fragment from a medieval grave-slab and a niche are incorporated in the west front of the tower. The west end of the church has a three-light window, and at the east end are three stepped lancet windows. The south wall of the church contains another medieval grave-slab, and a diamond-shaped sundial dated 1776. The interior of the church is plain and plastered. The font dates from the 13th century. The reredos is dated 1889 and is constructed from Caen stone and marble.

== External features ==
In the churchyard is a grave headstone in sandstone dated 1786. At the top is a carved depiction of an angel's head with wings, and foliage. The headstone is listed at Grade II. Also listed at Grade II are the remains of a sandstone village cross dating from the medieval period.

== See also ==
- List of works by Sharpe and Paley
