= Bishopton Castle =

- County Durham, England
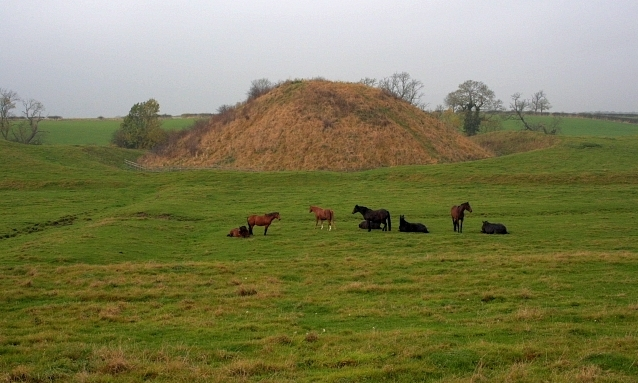
- Surviving motte

Site information
- Type: Motte-and-bailey
- Condition: Earthworks only

Location
- Shown within County Durham
- Coordinates: 54.5811°N 1.4353°W
- Grid reference: grid reference NZ366208

Bishopton Castle was a medieval castle in Bishopton village, County Durham, England. The surviving motte is a Scheduled Ancient Monument.

== Details ==
Map showing Bishopton Castle, County Durham, which stands in fields south of the village.

Bishopton Castle was built by Roger de Conyers in 1143, in the village of Bishopton, near to the town of Darlington. Constructed in a motte-and-bailey design, the castle had two baileys, rather than the usual one, and originally had two large enclosures beyond the baileys. In the 12th century it was surrounded by a low artificial lake, fed by the brook to the west, and could only be accessed by causeways.

De Conyers built the castle during a dispute with William Cumin, who laid claim to be the Bishop of Durham; de Conyers supported Cumin's rival, William of St. Barbara. Historian Lise Hull believes that the licence to crenellate given to de Conyers for his castle may be the first recorded instance of this in England, but Philip Davis rejects the licence on the grounds that the fortification was a matter of necessity rather than consent, and that the supposed licence contains no indicative wording.

In later years the castle became owned directly by the Bishop of Durham, a powerful regional landowner.

The mound was one of twenty investigated by the Round Mounds Project during 2015 and 2016, looking for possible pre-historic mounds that had been re-used as Norman mottes. A 10cm diameter core sample was taken, running from the top of the mound down to below the original ground level, with Radiocarbon dating of the buried material. The great majority of the mounds investigated confirmed a Norman construction, with no sign of a previous earthwork. This was the case at the Bishopton mound, where a Norman date was confirmed. It also identified that the raised causeway on the north side was a secondary feature, which had not been part of the original construction.

== See also ==
- Castles in Great Britain and Ireland
- List of castles in England

== Bibliography ==
- Brickstock, Richard. (2007) Castle: Fortress, Palace, College. Durham: Jeremy Mills Publishing. ISBN 978-1-905217-24-3.
- Creighton, Oliver Hamilton. (2005) Castles and Landscapes: Power, Community and Fortification in Medieval England. London: Equinox. ISBN 978-1-904768-67-8.
- Hull, Lise E. (2006) Britain's Medieval Castles. Westport: Praeger. ISBN 978-0-275-98414-4.
- Hull, Lise E. (2009) Understanding the Castle Ruins of England and Wales: How to Interpret the History and Meaning of Masonry and Earthworks. Jefferson, US: MacFarland. ISBN 978-0-7864-3457-2.
- Pettifer, Adrian. (2002) English Castles: a Guide by Counties. Woodbridge, UK: Boydell Press. ISBN 978-0-85115-782-5.
