= Great Stainton =

Village in County Durham, England

Coordinates: 54°35′N 1°29′W

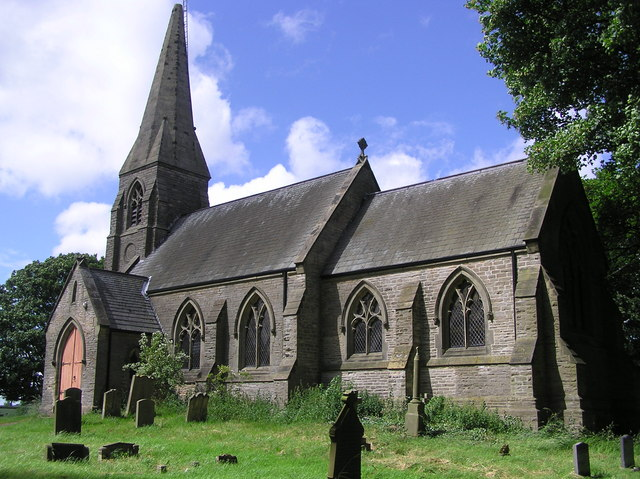

Great Stainton is a village in the borough of Darlington and ceremonial county of County Durham, England. It is situated to the north of Darlington, and to the west of Stockton-on-Tees. Elstob is a hamlet, just north of Great Stainton, which is part of the Parish of Great Stainton. The population as taken at the Census 2011 was less than 100. Details are now maintained in the parish of Little Stainton.
