= Sidi Moussa =

Sidi Moussa may refer to:

== Locations in North Africa ==
- Sidi Moussa, Algeria
- Sidi Moussa (Marrakech-Safi): small town and rural commune in El Kelâat Es-Sraghna Province of the Marrakesh-Safi region of Morocco.
- Sidi Moussa (Fes-Meknes): a village in the rural commune Karmet Ben Salem, Meknès Prefecture, Fès-Meknès region of Morocco. This location has the remains of a Roman castra, one of five erected to defend the city of Volubilis.
- Sidi Moussa Lhamri: a small town and rural commune in Taroudant Province of the Souss-Massa-Drâa region of Morocco.
- Sidi Moussa Tannery: a historic tanning facility located in the heart of Fes el-Bali, the historic medina of Fez, Morocco.

== Other uses ==
- Sidi Moussa massacre: bloodiest massacre in Algeria in the 1990s
