= Aïn Schkor =

Hamlet in Morocco and site of Ancient Roman fortress

Coordinates: 34°6′14.70168″N 5°33′1.24200″W

Aïn Schkor, Morocco (عين النتيجة) is a hamlet in Morocco which served during the Roman Empire as one of five castra (forts) that guarded the city of Volubilis, located 3 kilometers to the south, from incursions from over the nearby Limes Africanus. In antiquity Aïn Schkor housed Spanish and Belgic cohorts.

== Description ==
The Roman ruins consist of remains of the castellum, occupied in the 1st and 2nd century A.D. by the cohors I Asturum et Callaecorum and rebuilt in the 3rd century by the cohors IV Tungrorum. South of the castra are remains of a settlement and west of the castra are ruins of Roman farms and agricultural estates. East of the castra, on the foothills of the Jebel Zerhoun, are quarries that were worked in antiquity. These provided much of the stone for building Volubilis.

== Regional History ==
Rome's control over the area ended following the chaos of the Crisis of the Third Century, when the empire nearly disintegrated as a series of generals seized and lost power through civil wars, palace coups and assassinations.

In 708, the area was taken over as part of the Arab conquest of the Maghreb. The Idrissids (786-917), established their capital at nearby Volubilis, a few kilometers away.

The nearby city of Meknes to the south was founded as a military establishment by the Almoravids in the 11th century, and though it was toppled by the Almohads in 1147, was rebuilt and became one of Morocco's most important cities.

== Climate ==
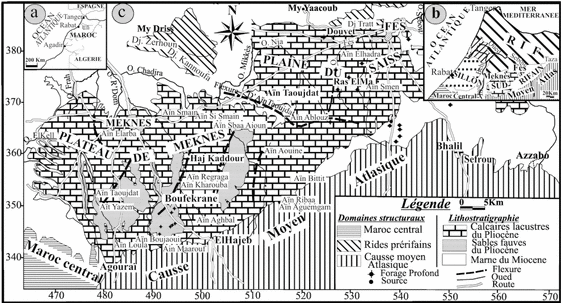
Saiss Plain.

The region around Aïn Schkor experiences a degraded Mediterranean climate, undergoing continental influences during the summer and winter seasons. However, the geographical diversity of the region means that each of its natural areas has particular climatic nuances. The temperature of the hottest month varies between 30 °C and 45 °C, and that of the coldest month varies between 0 °C and 7 °C, but the freezing period is very strong.
