= Sidi Moussa (Fes-Meknes) =

Sidi Moussa is a village in the rural commune Karmet Ben Salem, Meknès Prefecture, Fès-Meknès region of Morocco. There are 63 people who lived there according to the 2004 official census.

== History ==
During the Roman Empire the village was the site of a castra that housed a cohort of Parthian troupes. The castra was one of five in the area that guarded the nearby city of Volubilis from incursion from over the nearby Limes Africanus.
