= Sidi Said, Morocco =

Hamlet in Morocco

Sidi Said
- سيدي سعيد
- Location within Morocco
- 34°04′16″N 05°34′10″W
- Type: other
- Cultures: Roman
- Location: Meknès Prefecture, Fès-Meknès, Morocco
- Region: Mauretania

History
- Built: 2nd Century AD
- Abandoned: 6th century AD

Sidi Said, Morocco is a hamlet in Morocco located at 28° 27' 36" North, 10° 34' 12" was one of five castra that, during the Roman period, guarded the city of Volubilis from incursion over the nearby Limes Africanus. Sidi Said was the base for the Cohors IV Gallorum equitata, an auxiliary cavalry unit from Gaul. Rome's control over the area ended, however, following the chaos of the Crisis of the Third Century, when the empire nearly disintegrated as a series of generals seized and lost power through civil wars, palace coups and assassinations.

the Arabs had arrived in 708. The Idrissids (786–917), established their capital at nearby Volubilis, a few kilometers north-west of Sidi Said. The city of Meknes to the south was founded by the Almoravids in the 11th century, as a military establishment and Almohads, toppled the Almoravids in 1147.

== Climate ==
The region around Sidi Said experiences a degraded Mediterranean climate, undergoing continental influences during the summer and winter seasons. However, the geographical diversity of the region means that each of its natural areas has particular climatic nuances. The temperature of the hottest month varies between 30 °C and 45 °C, and that of the coldest month varies between 0 °C and 7 °C, but the freezing period is very strong.
