= Abusina =

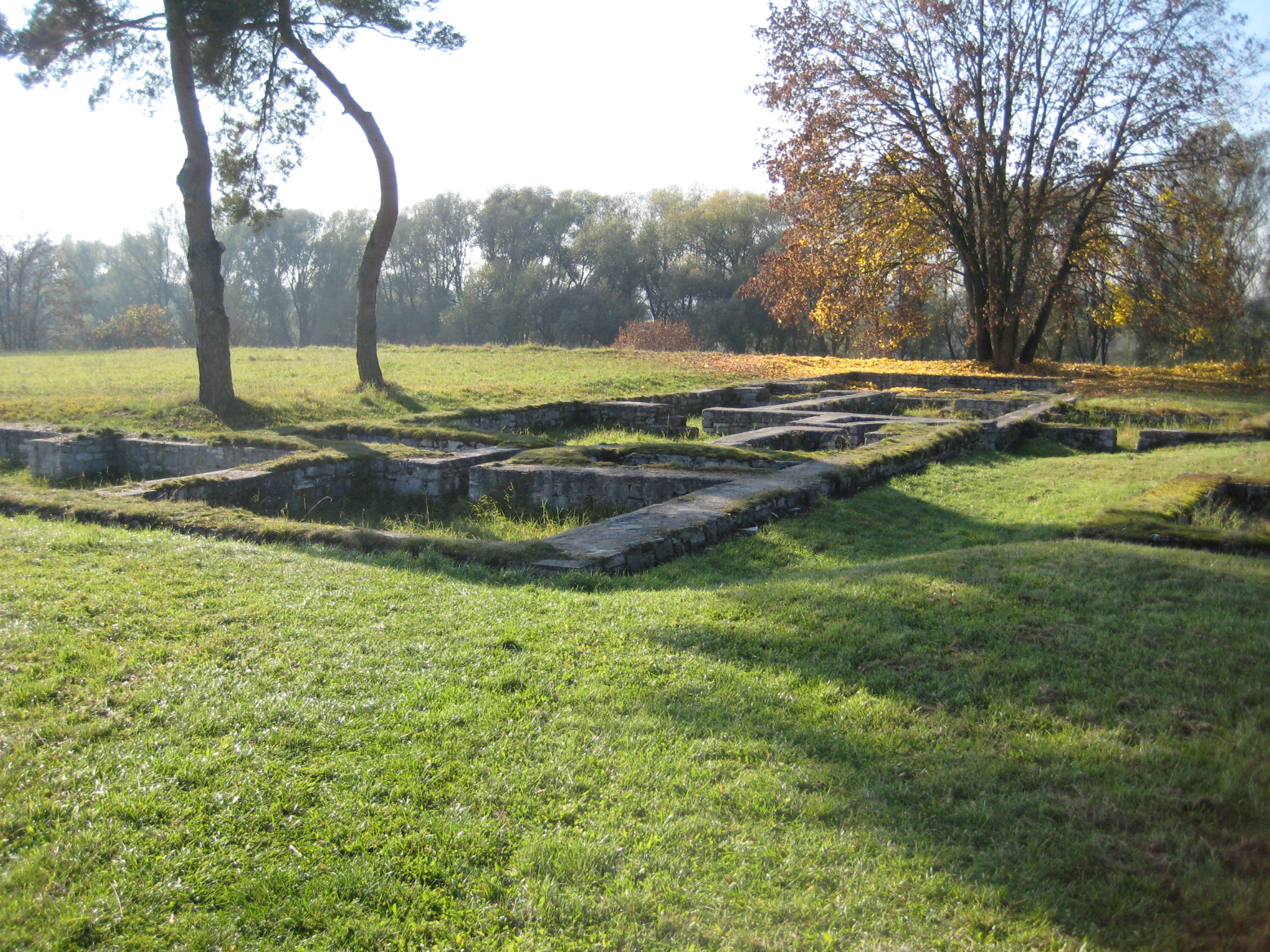

Abusina or Abusena was a Roman castra (military outpost), and later vicus of town, of the Roman Province of Raetia. The location is a few miles west of the Castra Regina (Regensburg).

It was at Eining near Abensberg, on the Upper German- Raetian Limes, which at this point was the Danube River. The outpost was originally built out of earth and timber by cohors IV Gallorum in 79-81. The fortress was later rebuilt in stone during Antoninus Pius reign. Abusina stood near to the eastern termination of the high road which ran from the Roman military station Vindonissa on the Aar to the Danube. It guarded a bridge used by legions that may have often passed to guard the "limes imperii".

In the 2nd century the fort was occupied by the Cohors IV Tungrorum with about 1,000 men. By the later Roman Empire, archaeology and the Notitia Dignitatum suggest the site was occupied by Cohors III Brittonum with only 50 men. In 233, it was sacked by the Alemanni and was abandoned by 254. It was reoccupied in 280.

== Vicus ==
The military camp at Eining was surrounded in a fan shape by a civilian settlement, a vicus. Its main thoroughfares were the Danube South Road, which curved around the fort, and the road branching off eastward from this road immediately before the Porta Praetoria. The vicus extended approximately 500 meters in every direction from the fort gate, so that at its peak, the village stretched about one kilometer from north to south and almost half a kilometer from west to east.

The families of active soldiers settled there, as did merchants, craftsmen, and innkeepers who supplied the military camp with goods and services. Later, soldiers who had completed their service also settled there, as evidenced by numerous discharge certificates, so-called military diplomas, found during excavations. Most of the buildings in the vicus were simple timber-framed houses, but there were also a few stone buildings, some with underfloor heating and up to 50 meters long. They were identified using field archaeology and aerial archaeology.

Immediately outside the fort walls were two successive bathing complexes. A first, small bathhouse was built on the steep bank of the Danube, but had to be abandoned soon afterward due to the constant risk of flooding. It was replaced by a large, impressive bathhouse complex north of the fort, equipped with all the comforts of the time.

Also located in front of the northern front of the fort was a large, heated mansio, complete with a small bathing area. This mansio served as an inn and horse-changing station for officials traveling on behalf of the state. The Eining mansio also served as the headquarters of the beneficiarii, a type of road police force with toll collection powers, responsible for the safety of the Roman road network.
