= Cohors IV Tungrorum =

The Cohors IV Tungrorum mill eq was an Auxiliary cohort of the Roman Army based in Abusina during the second century. It had a strength of 1040 soldiers.

It was named for Civitas Tungrorum and by the rule of Antoninus Pius was stationed in Mauretania Tingitana where it is attested from an inscription of about 140 AD. The regiment having twice the soldiers of a standard quingenaria unit, and were mainly Raetians from Tungri. There was also a veteran unit.

Inscription evidence tells us under Domitian the unit was also in Noricum and then later in Raetia, possibly at Faimingen.

== Known members ==
- Tribunus T Claudius Zeno.

== See also ==
- List of Roman auxiliary regiments
