= Karmet Ben Salem =

Karmet Ben Salem كرمة بن سالم
- Rural commune and town
- Location within Morocco
- Coordinates: 34.1070°N 5.4952°W
- Country: Morocco
- Region: Fès-Meknès
- Prefecture: Meknès Prefecture

Population (2004)
  - Total: 4,180
- Time zone: UTC+0 (GMT)

Karmet Ben Salem is a small town and former rural commune in Meknès Prefecture of the Fès-Meknès region of Morocco. At the time of the 2004 census, the commune had a total population of 4180 people living in 842 households.

the commune was merged and is now defunct.
