= Limes Britannicus =

Ancient Roman frontier in Britain

Coordinates: 54°59′29″N 2°21′39″W

Major transport routes in Britannia in the mid-2nd century

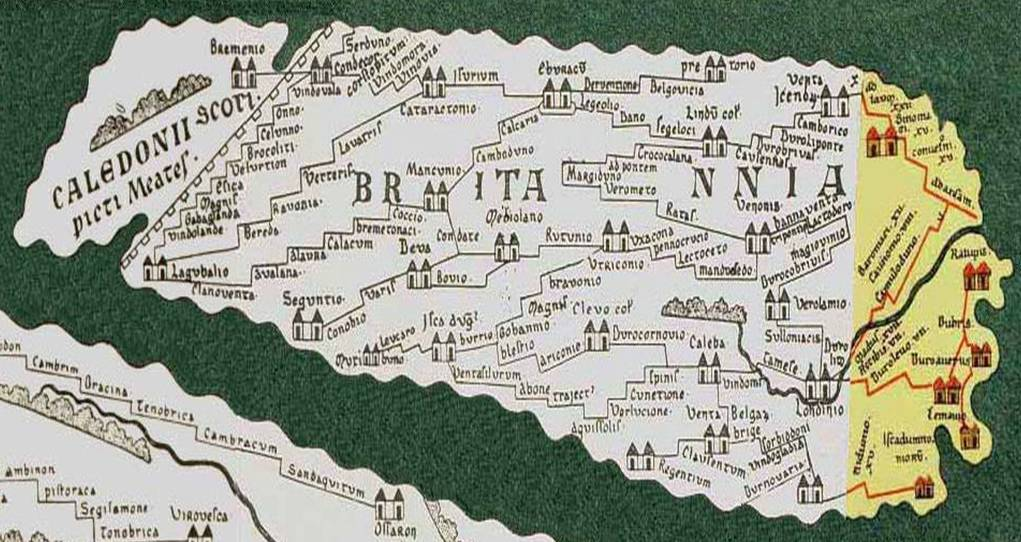
Britannia in the Tabula Peutingeriana, only the yellow highlighted section survived, the rest was added in 1887 by Konrad Miller

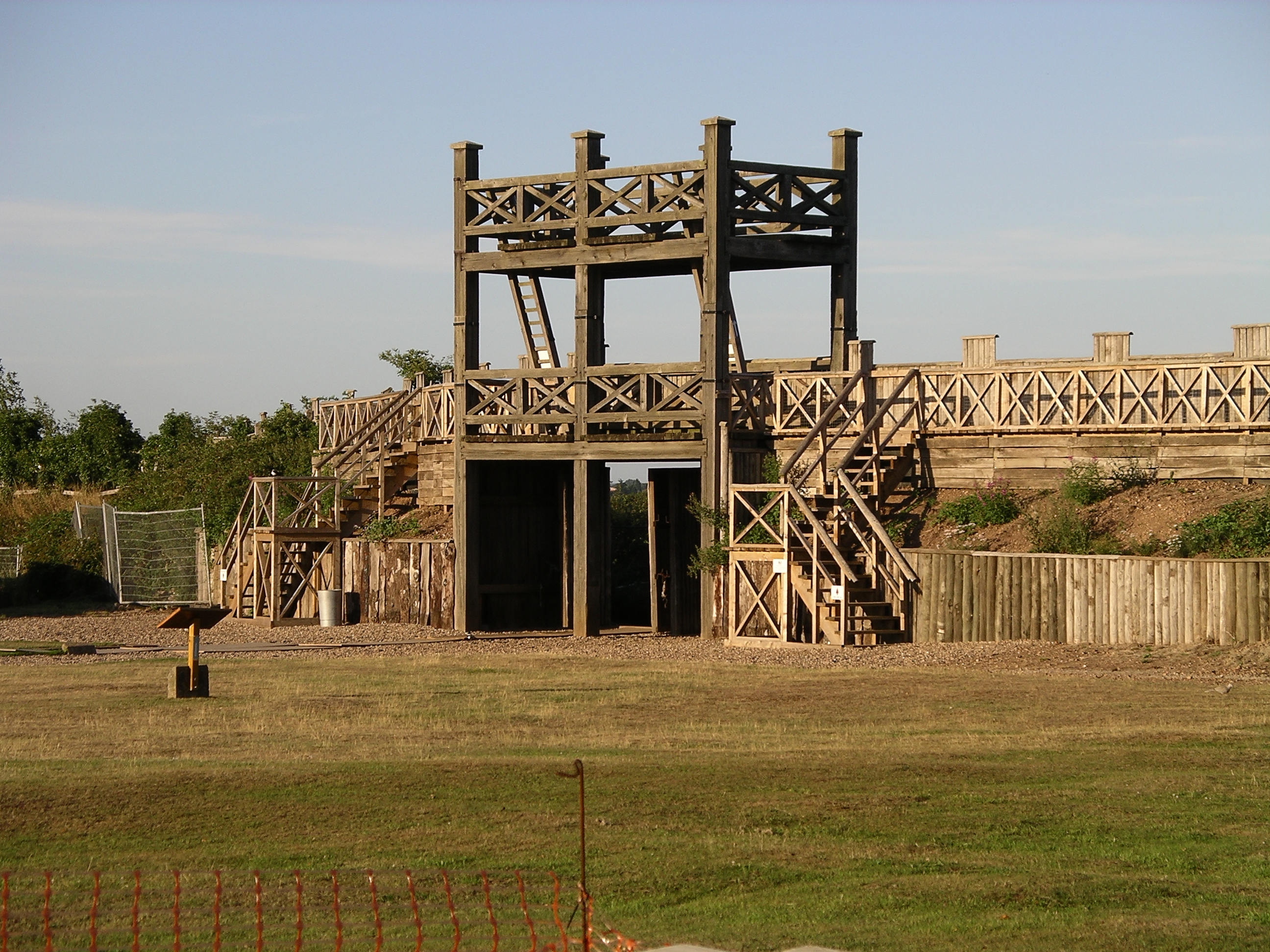
Midlands: Reconstruction of the main gate of the wood and earth camp of Lunt

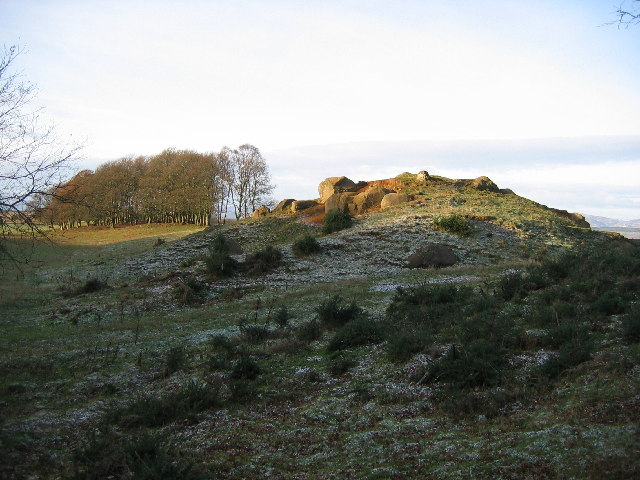
The North: remains of a Roman watchtower on the Gask Ridge

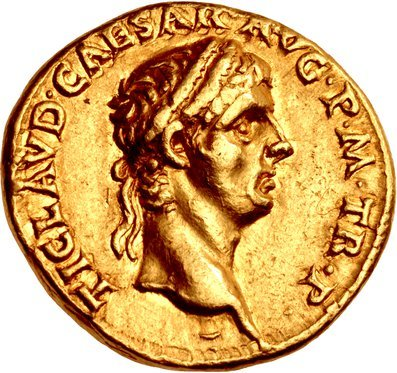
Claudius

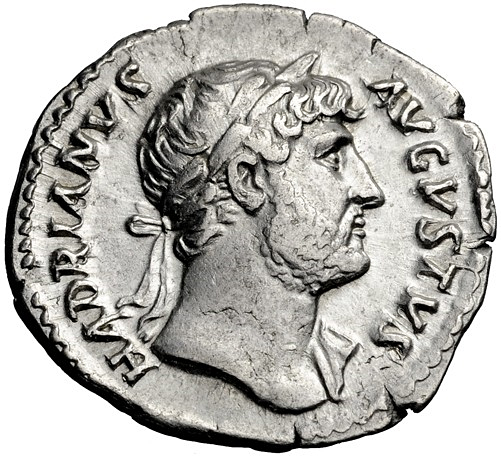
Hadrian

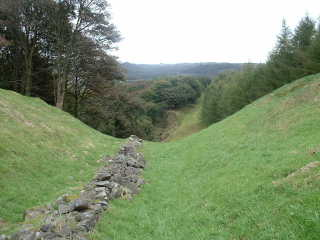
The North: the Antonine Wall at Barr Hill between Twechar and Croy

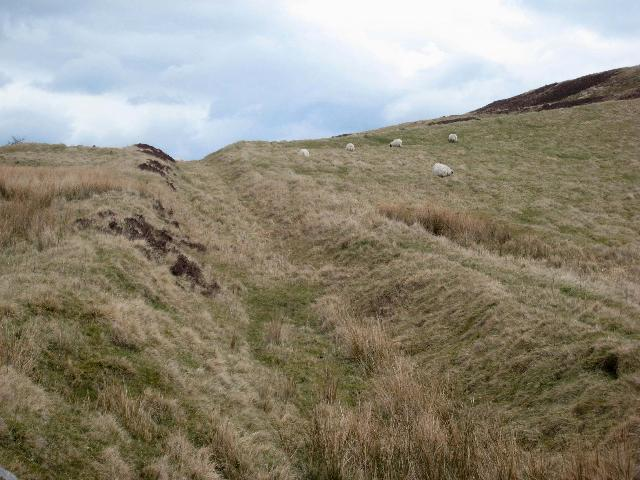
The North: the Stanegate near Vindolanda

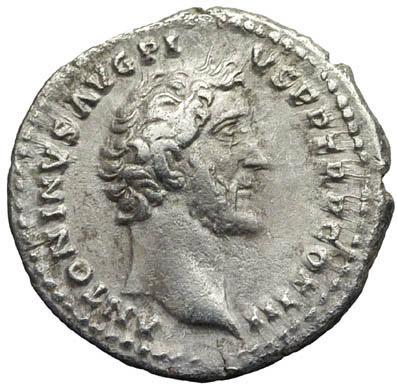
Antoninus Pius

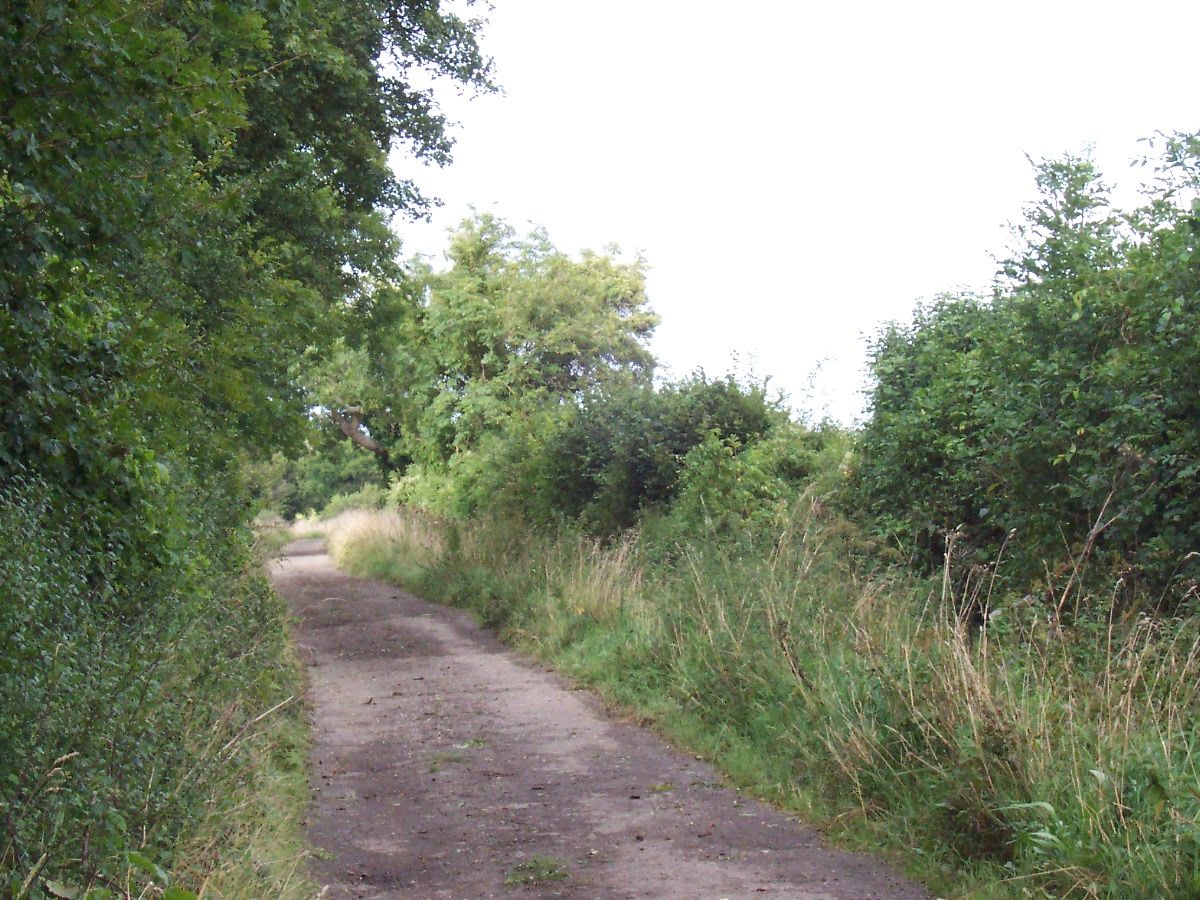
Section of the Fosse Way (side road north of the M4)

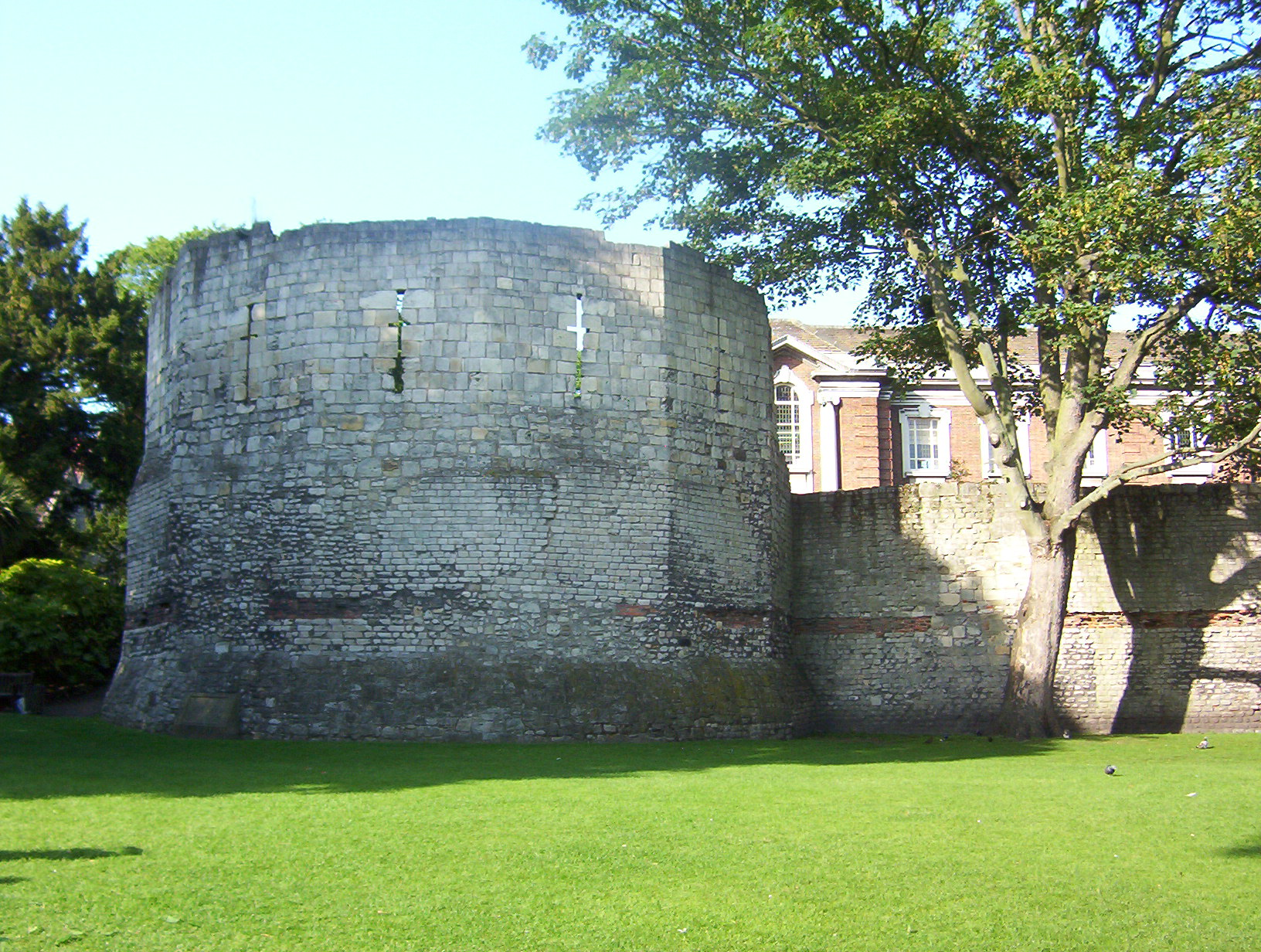
The North: corner tower of the Late Antiquity on the west wall of the legion camp at Eburacum

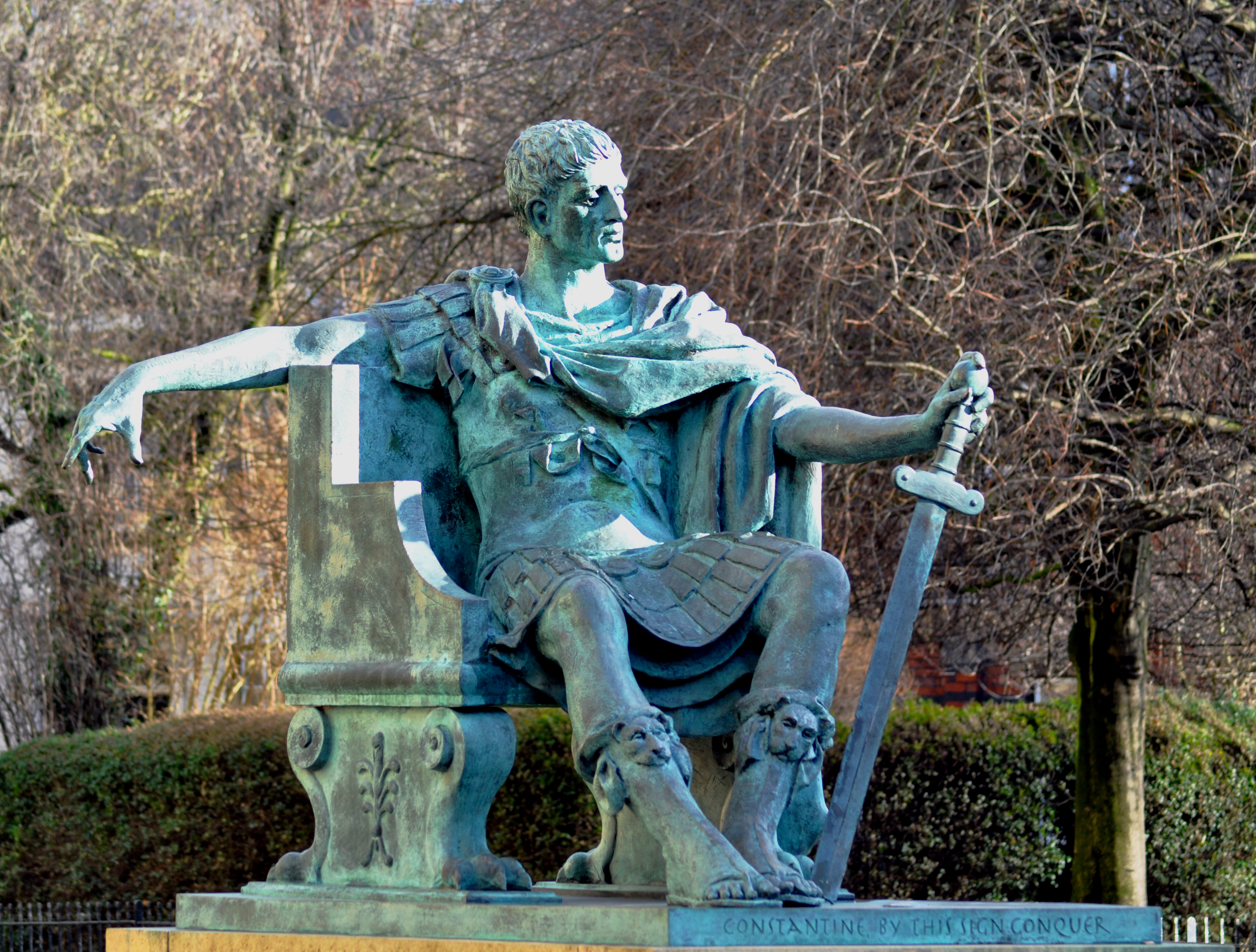
Statue of Constantine I in York

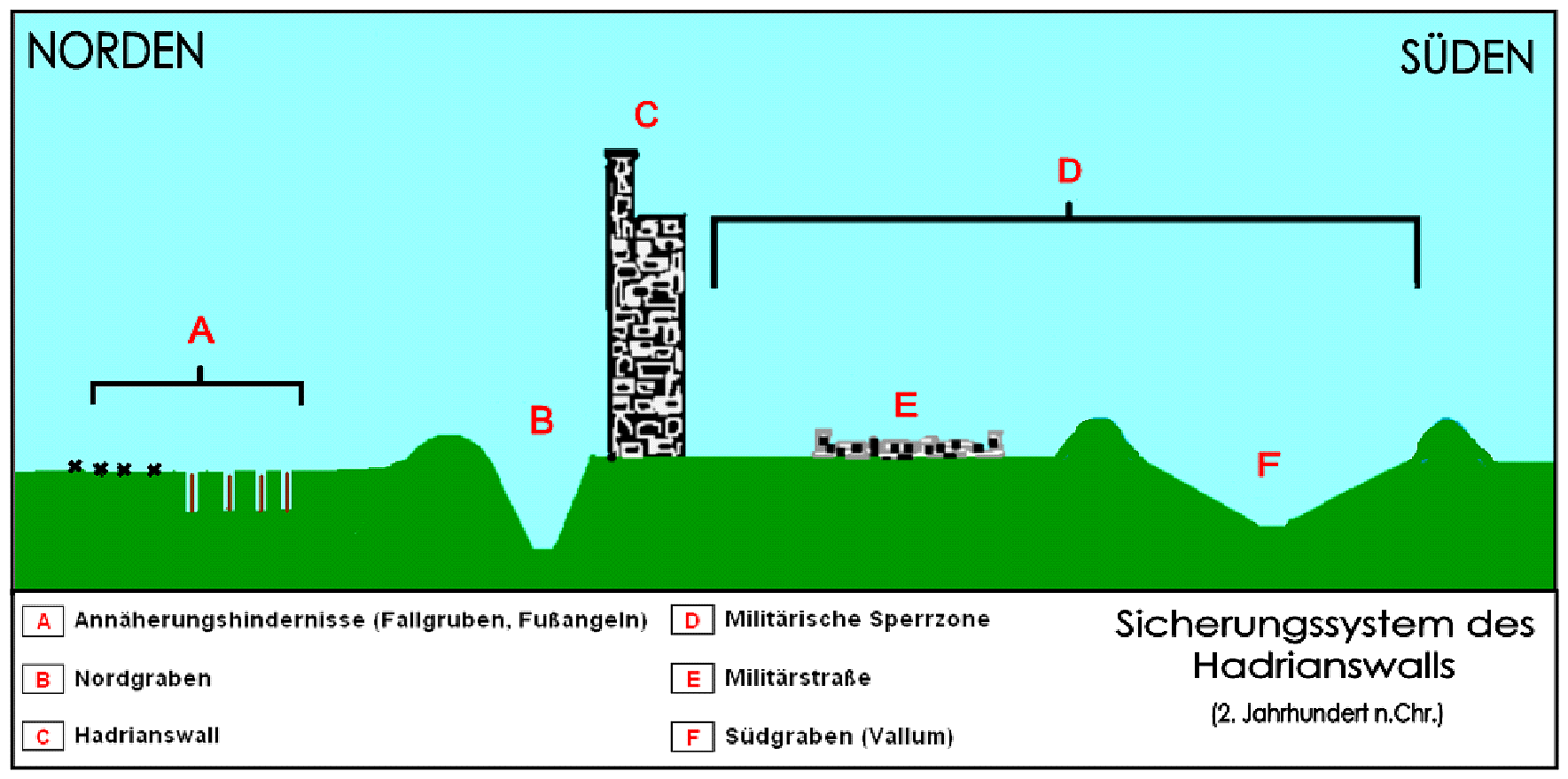
The North: section through the fortifications of Hadrian's Wall

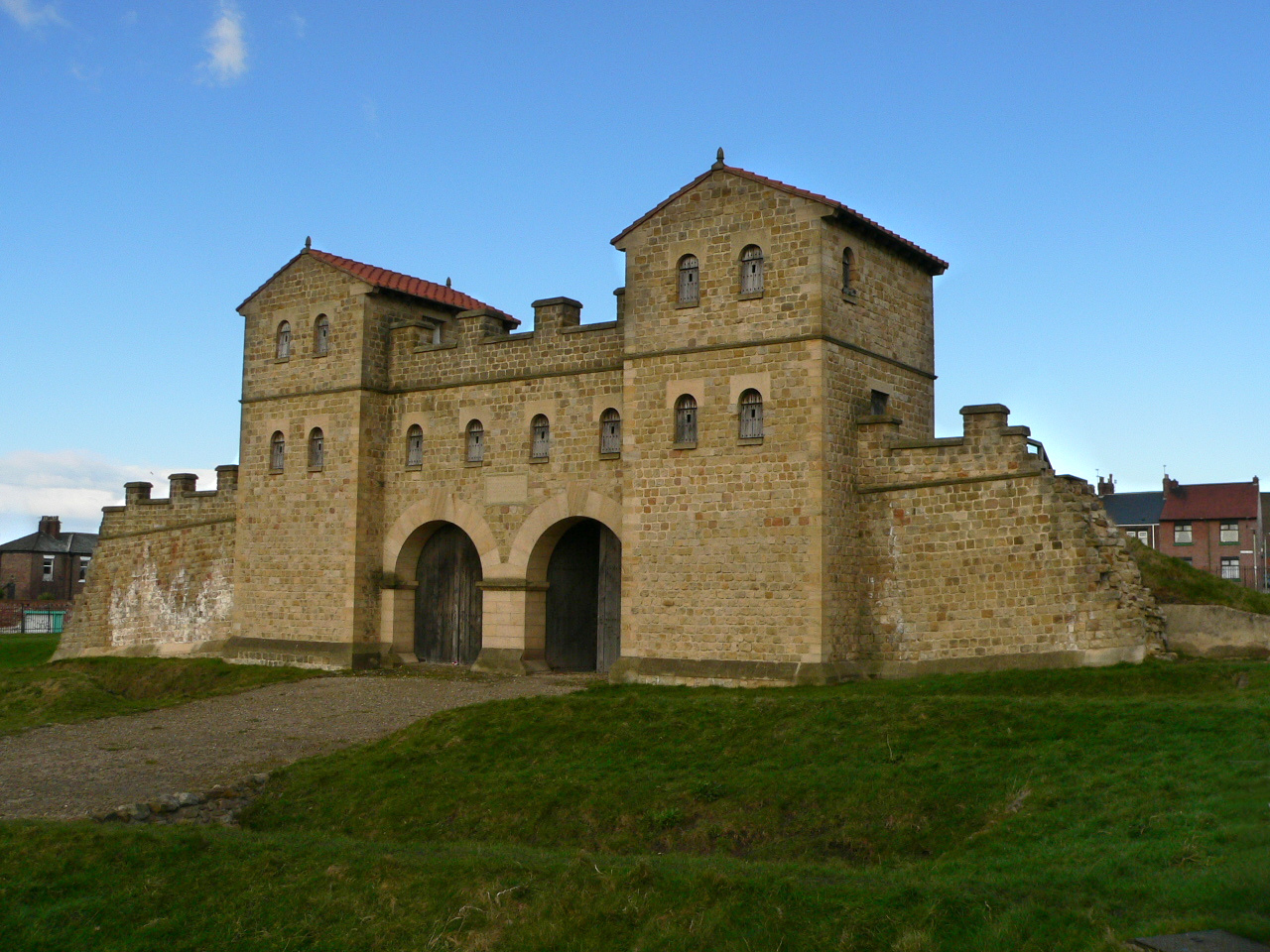
The North: reconstruction of the west gateway of Arbeia

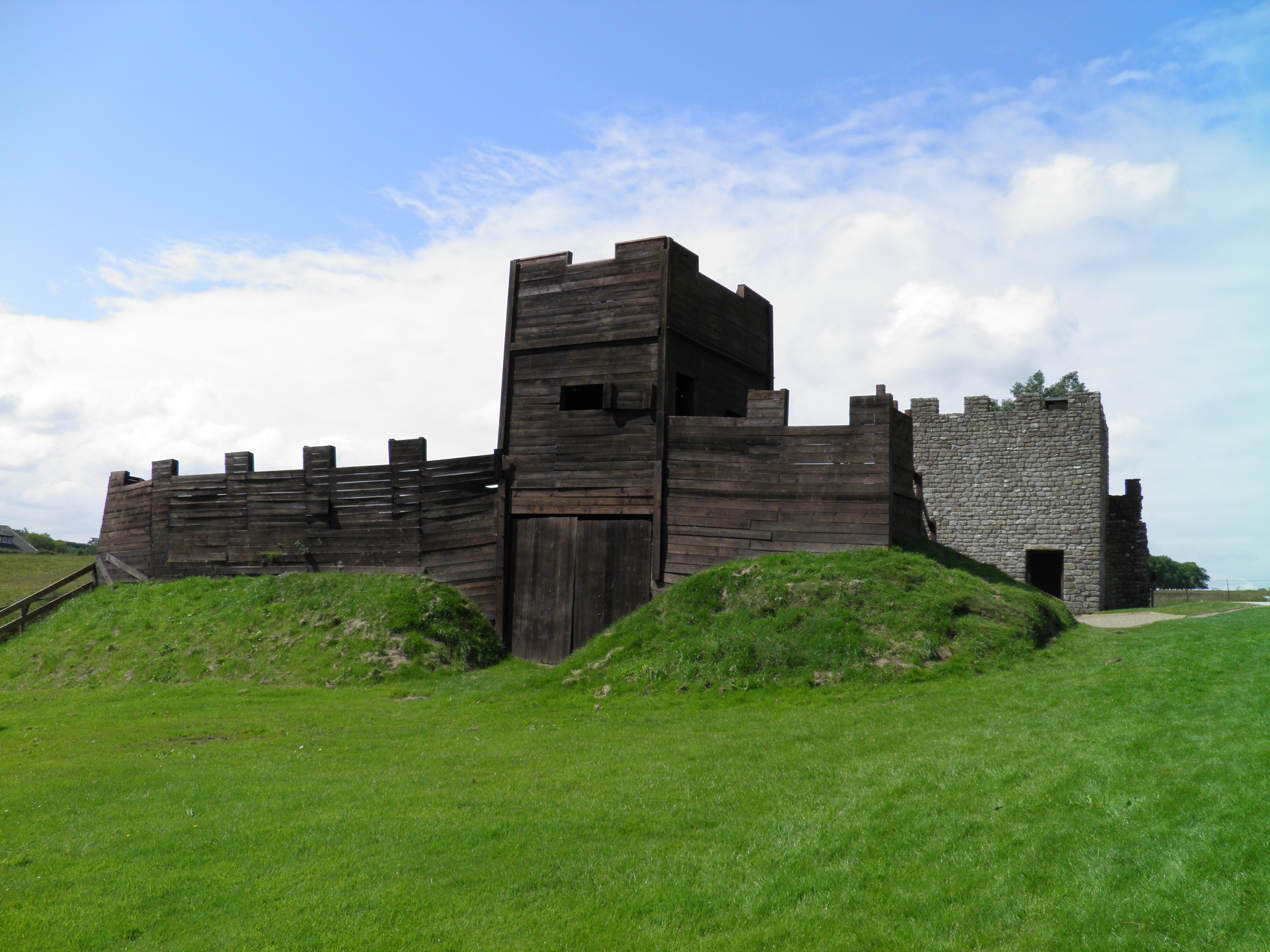
The North: reconstructed wooden tower in Vindolanda

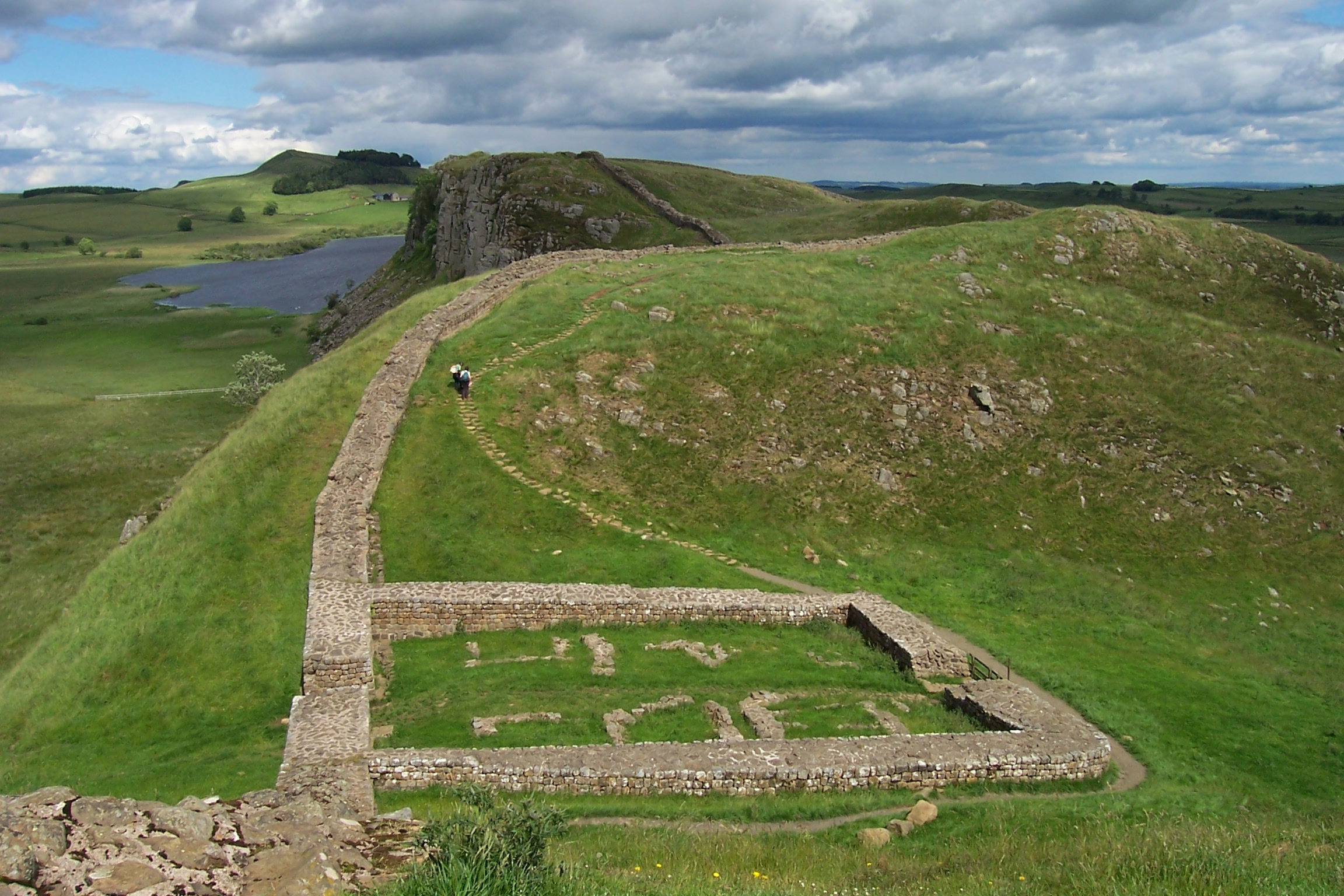
The North: the ruins of Milecastle 39 (Castle Nick) in the middle section of Hadrian's Wall

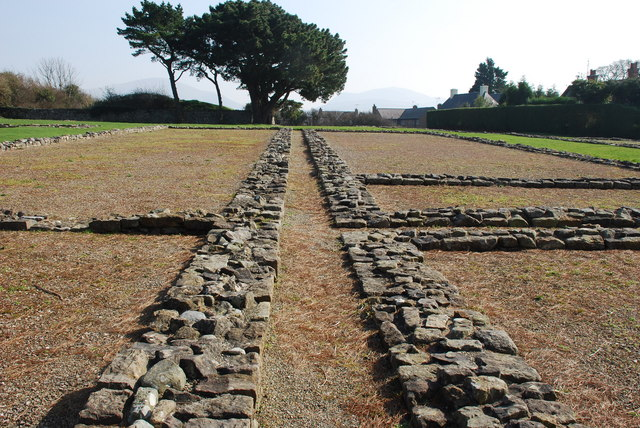
West: remains of the barracks in the fort of Segontium

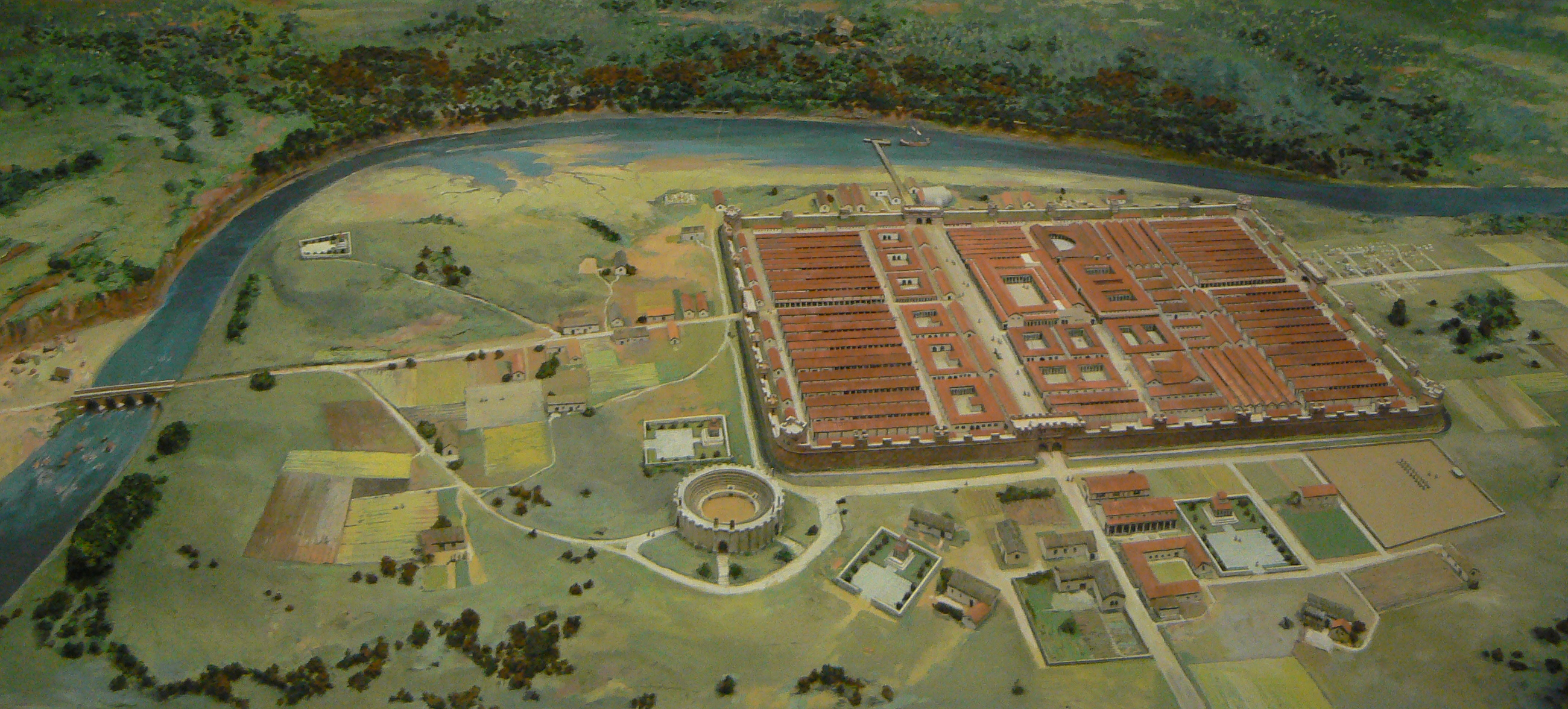
West: diorama of the legion camp of Deva (Grosvenor Museum, Chester)

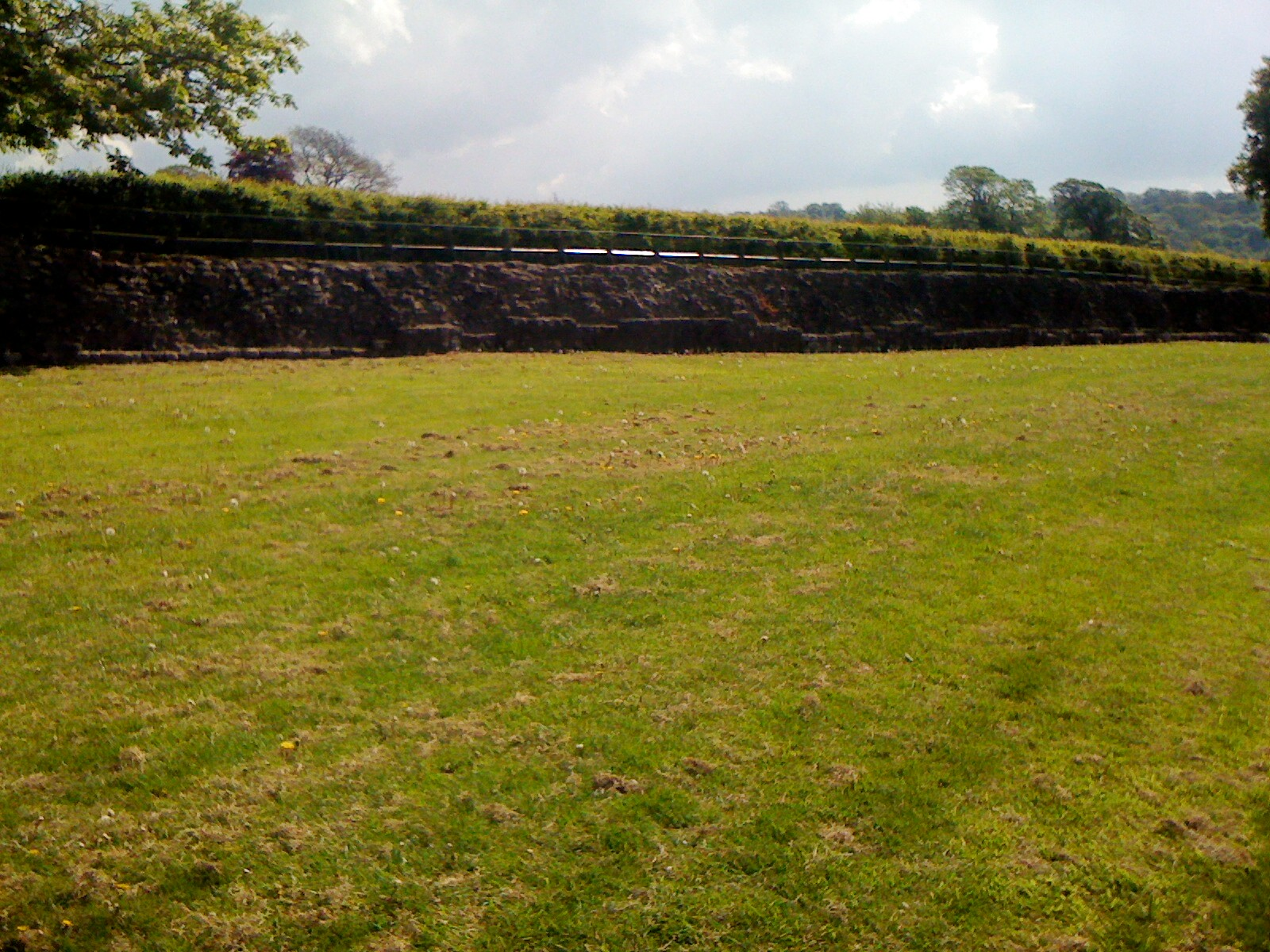
West: wall remains of the legion camp of Isca

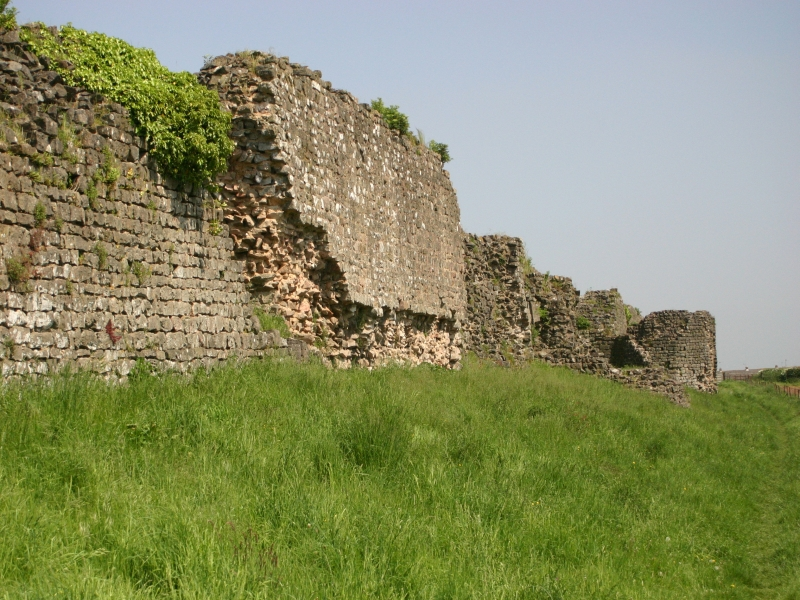
West: the late Roman wall of Caerwent

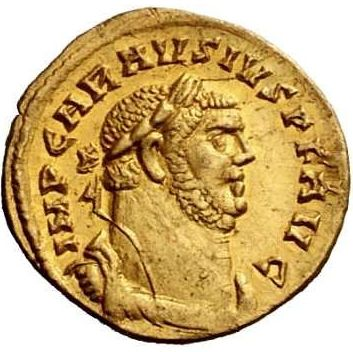
Carausius

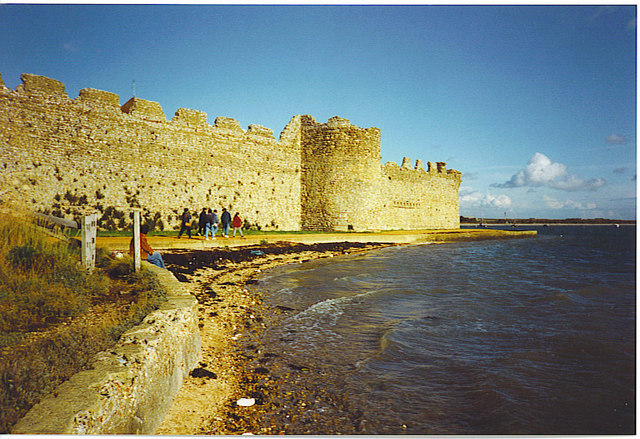
Southeast: view of the east wall of the fort of Portus Adurni

Southeast: wall section of the Saxon coastal fort of Anderitum

The frontier of the Roman Empire in Britain is sometimes styled Limes Britannicus ("British Limes") by authors for the boundaries, including fortifications and defensive ramparts, that were built to protect Roman Britain (the term Limes is mainly and originally used for the Roman frontier in the Germanic provinces). These defences existed from the 1st to the 5th centuries AD and ran through the territory of present-day England, Scotland and Wales.

Britain was one of the most troubled regions in the European part of the Roman Empire and could only be secured by the Roman Army at considerable effort. Despite a rapid victory over the tribes in the south, which Claudius' field commander, Aulus Plautius, achieved in 43 AD for Rome, the resistance of the British was not completely broken for a long time afterwards. Nevertheless, the Romans succeeded in further consolidating their rule in the period that followed, although the troops stationed there were overburdened by having to defend Britain simultaneously on three fronts. The incursions of barbarians from the north of the island repeatedly caused serious problems. To the west and south, the Britannic provinces had to be defended against Hibernian and Germanic attacks. Rome held the province for three and a half centuries. Behind the protection of Hadrian's Wall and that formed by the natural coastal boundaries to the east, south and west, the region we now know as England was heavily influenced by Roman civilisation. Hadrian's Wall and the castra on the Saxon Shore are still the most prominent symbols of Roman rule over Britain.

== Development ==
=== Overview ===
The conquest of Britain was ordered in 43 AD by Emperor Claudius. Claudius had a low reputation among his troops and was forced - according to the tradition of emperors - to acquire glory on the battlefield in order to secure his rule permanently. Britannia had large deposits of precious metals, fertile soil and vast forests, which made it economically attractive to the Romans. Most of Great Britain was conquered in the first year of the invasion. However, this campaign sparked a long-running resistance by the native Britons against their occupiers that lasted for decades. Following the Boudica Uprising, they almost succeeded in expelling the Roman Army from the island. It may have been that Claudius initially planned to occupy only the lowland regions of Britain. In the 1st century, the Romans had no clear idea how large the island was. Roman influence was therefore continually extended as the borders of their conquered territory shifted significantly several times. Time and again fighting broke out with the indigenous Celtic tribes in the border zones of the new province, compelling Roman troops to move into new areas in the west and north, in order to ensure the permanence of Roman rule and to secure their borders. In 80 AD, the army of Agricola penetrated well into Caledonian territory (modern-day Scotland) after his victory in the Battle of Mons Graupius. After attempts to permanently occupy the Highlands failed, the Romans fell back in 120 AD to the Stanegate line. The majority of troops in Britain had to continue to be stationed in the north. As protection against raids by pirates from Ireland (Hibernia), a powerful protection force was also needed on the west coast. In particular, the regions of Cumbria and Lancashire suffered time and again from the plundering of the Irish.

Even during the reign of Hadrian, Britain was still not an entirely peaceful province. Coin missions dating to this time indicate that Britain was in a "permanent state of defence" and pre-Roman tribal societies continued to occupy the outer regions of the island. The greatest danger was always posed by the Picts from who lived on the far side of the Scottish rivers, the Forth and the Clyde. Moreover, in the lands between these rivers and Hadrian's Wall, the Central Lowlands, there were still four other Celtic tribes - the Votadini, Selgovae, Damnonii and Novantae - which Rome sought to incorporate in order to be able to neutralise their fighting power and make use of their farmland. To that end, road forts were built to protect Rome's territorial claims. From 122, the northern border was secured by Hadrian's Wall. The fortifications on the coast of Cumbria, which were erected later, were intended to prevent the Wall being circumvented in the West. Under Hadrian, the three legion camps were rebuilt in stone. In 140 AD, Roman troops advanced again against the Caledonians and built the Antonine Wall further to the north but, by 160, it had been abandoned. In the period 155-158 AD there was a revolt in Britain which led to heavy losses being inflicted on the local legions. These losses had to be made up by reinforcements from the Germanic Rhine provinces. At the end of the 2nd century seafaring Germanic peoples – the Angles, Saxons and Franks - began to threaten the Gallic and British coasts with the first raids from the continent. During the course of the civil war that followed the election of Septimius Severus as emperor, his rival, Clodius Albinus, set forth for the continent in 197 with the Britannic army, but suffered a crushing defeat against Severus’ troops in the Battle of Lugdunum (Lyon).

In the 3rd century, Roman Britain underwent profound changes. With the return of soldiers to the island, their first task was to drive back the Picts, who had taken advantage of the absence of Roman troops to raid and plunder extensively. As a result, Septimius Severus ordered a large-scale punitive expedition against the tribes north of Hadrian's Wall and even reoccupied the Antonine Wall for a short time. Unlike the other provinces, Britain appeared relatively stable and calm. The short-term separation of the island from the rest of the Empire under the usurper Carausius showed that this was an illusion and that the power of Rome was becoming increasingly weaker in Britain as well. Carausius used inter alia the anger of the Britons arising from their neglect by Rome for his own power-political purposes and founded his own empire consisting of Britain and a strip of land in northern Gaul. He wanted to build it up into his own centre of power within the Roman world, but failed in the face of a Roman counter-offensive ordered by Constantius Chlorus, which soon toppled the newly founded Romano-British Empire. In the late 3rd and into the 4th century, the security situation on the continent became critical again, as the pressure from barbarian tribes on the borders of the Rhine and Danube had not waned. From the 4th century, Britain was again increasingly the target of attacks by Saxons, Picts and Scots. The last named sailed around Hadrian's Wall and initially penetrated far into the south of the country. The crews of the watchtowers and forts on the coast of Cumbria were usually only able to warn the population. Due to the precarious security situation in the rest of the Empire, units were increasingly withdrawn from the island so that, in the end, the British provinces were almost exclusively guarded by locally raised auxilia or newly recruited Germanic mercenaries. At the end of the 4th century, the last Roman troops left their camps in Wales, with the result that raiding and settling by the Irish significantly increased there. Around 400 AD, much of Hadrian's Wall also had to be abandoned for lack of troops. Most units of the mobile field army were ordered to leave Britain in 401/402 to go to the defence of Italy against the Visigoths under Alaric.

After the invasion of Gaul by several barbarian tribes in 406, contact was broken between Britain and the Western Roman central government in Ravenna. As a result, the provincial Roman army - probably encouraged by the local nobility – elected three of their own emperors in rapid succession, of whom the commander of the army eventually succeeded in 407 in holding onto power. He wanted to take advantage of the political and military chaos in Gaul caused by the barbarian invasion to strengthen his power and crossed with his loyal troops across the English Channel. At this point, the Romano-British renounced him probably in the wake of an uprising against the governor appointed by him. Around 410 AD, the last units of the mobile field army left the island, drawing to a close 300 years of Roman rule over Britain.

Thereafter, Anglo-Saxons were apparently recruited from the continent by the Romano-British civitas as reinforcements in order that they might defend themselves more effectively against the constant attacks. While some researchers assess that some of them had already reached the shores of Britain by 380 as mercenaries, the majority of historians believe this first took place in 440. However, these mercenaries soon rose up against their masters, allegedly because they were not adequately supplied by them. Their leaders now established their own independent kingdoms which expanded rapidly to the west and north. Many regions of Britain continued to be governed by the Roman model even after the Romans left, but this practice soon ceased with the continuous encroachment of Anglo-Saxon renegades. With the collapse of the old administrative districts into independent small kingdoms, the jointly maintained provincial army also lost its Roman character.

=== 1st Century ===
==== North ====
Four years after the Roman invasion, the conquered territory extended roughly as far as a line from Exeter (Isca Dumnoniorum) to Lincoln (Lindum Colonia), an important intra-Britannic transport hub. Around 55 AD the main camp of the Legio II Augusta was established in Isca Dumnoniorum. This was abandoned about 75 AD and the place was elevated into the civitas of the Dumnonii. The city of Lincoln was initially the headquarters of the Legio IX Hispana and, at the end of the reign of Domitian, was elevated to a Colonia. It lay on the river Witham, another important communication route. Near the town there was probably a bridge across the river. "Ermine Street" linked London (Londinium) with the legion camp of York (Eburacum). In addition, one of Roman Britain's main roads, the "Fosse Way", which ran from the west from the Welsh legion base of Exeter, terminated in Lincoln. Furthermore, a road led from Lincoln eastwards to the shores of the English Channel.

The first Roman frontier in the north and west of the island was marked by watchtowers and military camps, or castra, along the Fosse Way. This has led many historians to suggest that it served as the permanent border in the early years of Roman occupation. However, it is more likely that the boundary between Roman and Celtic Britain fluctuated markedly during this period. In Eburacum in 71 AD, a wood and earth military camp was built by the Legio IX Hispana to secure the northern region. Following the defeat of the Welsh tribes, Agricola's army advanced against particularly warlike Pictish tribes in the inhabited areas in the north. In 79, his soldiers reached the Tanaus (or Taus; its location is unknown today, but it could have been the Firth of Tay) and established several camps. In 80 AD, Agricola secured his conquests further, and built a row of defensive camps across a narrow neck in the north of Britain where the inlets of the sea cut deeply into the island between what Tacitus had called Clota (the Firth of Clyde) and Bodotria (the Firth of Forth). In 82, he moved with his troops and a unit of the fleet along the east coast of Scotland, into the regions north of the Firth of Forth. To support this incursion he built bases such as Pinnata Castra, a legion camp near Inchtuthil. Subsequently, he tried to secure the north permanently with further fortifications on the so-called Gask Ridge. However, the expenditure on military equipment and logistics and the losses in this endless fighting greatly outweighed the benefits gained. After his recall, Caledonia, with its harsh climate and sparse resources, was once again left to itself and the Romans restricted themselves to securing the most fertile and economically attractive regions of the island. Moreover, the troops tied up in Britannia were increasingly needed on the continent to defend the Rhine and Lower Danube from Germanic and Dacian attacks.

In 87 AD, when Domitian withdrew the Legio II Augusta and the majority of auxiliary units from the Scottish Lowlands for his Dacian war, this region could also no longer be held due to the lack of troops. The northern border of Roman Britain became the Tyne-Solway Firth line, a chain of military camps on the Stanegate road. After 100 AD, the last Roman castra in the lowlands - with one or two exceptions - were abandoned.

==== Southeast ====
After the invasion of the Romans, the first legion camp was established near the town of Camulodunum around 43-44 AD. This became home to the Legio XX Valeria Victrix and various auxilia units. However, in the winter of 48-49, its garrison was ordered by Publius Ostorius Scapula to move to Glevum (Gloucester) in Wales and the fortifications in Camulodunum were slighted. The camp was left to civilians and legion veterans and turned into a Roman colonial town.

==== West ====
The occupation of the West was largely completed by AD 52 with a victory over the tribe of the Silures. From 74/75 AD Isca Augusta (Caerleon) became the new headquarters of the Legio II Augusta. The Silurii were only finally overthrown, however, until 78 after several campaigns led by Frontinus. His successor, Gnaeus Julius Agricola, finally subjugated the Ordovices in early 79, and occupied the island of Mona, a holy island of the Britons and centre of the Druid cult. To consolidate Roman rule, Agricola had several auxilia camps built in 77 or 78 AD on the Welsh coast, such as those at Canovium (Caerhun) and Segontium (Caernarvon). Following the evacuation of the military camp in Inchtuthil, the legion stationed there, the Legio XX Valeria Victrix was moved in 88 to the camp of Deva Victrix (Chester), originally built by the Legio II Adiutrix. The legion later rebuilt the old wood and earth camp into a stone fort and also operated a lead mine there.

=== 2nd Century ===
==== North ====
At the turn of the 1st and 2nd centuries, the Stanegate and the camps and watchtowers lined along it marked the northern border of Roman dominion. Unlike the other limites in the Roman Empire, there was no natural barrier such as wide river that crossed the entire island and whose banks could be relatively easily fortified against continuous attacks and plundering by the northern tribes. As a result, the Romans were forced to build artificial barriers there. First, they secured the land between the mouth of the Tyne and the Solway Firth (Hadrian) and, later, the isthmus between the Firth of Forth and Firth of Clyde (Antonine Wall). Around 108, the camp of Eburacum was rebuilt in stone and, from 120, it formed the base for the Legio VI Victrix. In the years 139 to 141, conflict with the Caledonian tribes escalated. In response, Rome occupied the Lowlands again. Around 155, the Romans withdrew from the Antonine Wall, only to reoccupy it a short while later. In 155-158, serious unrest broke out in the north. The local legion had to be reinforced with contingents from the Germanic provinces. In 163, the Antonine Wall was finally abandoned and, instead, Hadrian's Wall was manned again and - where necessary - repaired. Most of the passages of the milecastles in the north were bricked up and causeways over the forward defensive ditches were removed.

==== West and Southeast ====
Defence and observation on the coasts in the West and Southeast were also carried out by chains of castra, watchtowers and signal towers and along the main roads in the interior. The majority of provincial troops stationed in such camps, forts and watchtowers. In an emergency, they received support from the legions, who had their headquarters in the three major military centres of the island. These legion camps were connected by a good road network to all those regions across the island that were occupied by the Romans.

=== 3rd Century ===
==== North ====
At the end of his reign, in the early 3rd century, the already seriously ill Septimius Severus and his sons, Caracalla and Geta, led a costly campaign against the tribal areas north of the border. Caracalla was given the command of the army, while Geta received no command, but was responsible for purely civilian tasks. Nevertheless, both sons bore the victors’ name Britannicus maximus, as did Severus. The Roman army encountered heavy losses in the far north. A large number of military installations along Hadrian's Wall were repaired, but some towers may also have been demolished and some forts downsized during this period. The Antonine Wall was occupied again, in 208, for a short time and refortified. Severus died on 4 February 211 in Eburacum. In 287-296, during the usurpation of Carausius, Hadrian's Wall had fallen into disrepair and was partially destroyed in fighting. At the same time Carausius successfully defended his island kingdom against barbarian invasions. By his order Hadrian's Wall was repaired in order to re-establish an effective barrier against the northern Picts and Scots. As in his earlier actions against Frankish pirates Carausius rebuilt good diplomatic relations with the northern barbarians, and his local military successes may have been partly due to his good contacts with their leaders. Carausius' successor, Allectus, withdrew the majority of troops defending the Wall to the south to guard the Channel coast against Constantius Chlorus. In the late 3rd century the Picts and Scots changed their attack tactics. The Picts no longer attacked Hadrian's Wall directly but circumnavigated it by sea. Then they invaded the Roman provinces on the east coast. The Scots landed at the same time on the west coast, and plundered the population there. After the defeat of the usurper, Allectus Chlorus waged a revenge campaign against the invaders and his troops invaded their settlement areas north of Hadrian's Wall. He was accompanied by his son, Constantine. Constantius must have quickly won the fighting: in January 306 he had himself proclaimed as the "second victor of Britannia". But in that same year he died in Eburacum. Constantine was elected as emperior there by the soldiers. At the turn of the 4th century, the northern border was again stable but needed additional strong units to hold it.

==== West ====
The position of Roman emperors was especially at risk from being usurped by their legion commanders (see the imperial crisis of the 3rd century). Several of these agitators came from Britannia. In order to muster enough soldiers for their march on Rome, they reduced their British garrisons in every case far below the level needed for them to mount a credible defence. The forts in the west were always the first to have to give up their garrisons because this region was regarded as unimportant due to its remoteness and minor economic significance. Even the advance on Scotland under Antoninus Pius resulted in a substantial reduction of troops in Wales. Only a few forts like Segontium on the northwest coast remained occupied to keep the Celtic tribes living there under control. In the early third century, the Legio II Augusta returned to Caerleon after a prolonged campaign; despite that, the number of Roman troops in Wales remained very low. In the late third century, the local coastline was increasingly threatened by Irish and Scots bandits whose pirate ships operated mostly in the Bristol Channel, the seaway between the southwest peninsula of England and southern Wales. From there, they advanced into the richest regions of Britain, the Cotswolds and Wiltshire. For their defence, a new camp was built in Cardiff and other existing forts were repaired. Nevertheless, the border here became more and more porous since the decimated defending troops could no longer drive off the Irish settlers in the coastal regions.

==== Southeast ====
Fortified military camps and watchtowers were also used on the southeast coast, in this case to stop migration and plundering by the Franks, Angles and Saxons. From about 270, attempts were made to gain the upper hand over the seaborne attacks of Germanic marauders using heavily fortified strongholds, some of which were newly built. In his chronicle of the second half of the 4th century Eutropius reported that the commander of the Classis Britannica, Carausius, was tasked in 285 with tackling Frankish and Saxon piracy in the English Channel. The constant raids on the local coasts hindered maritime traffic and in particular the safe transportation of goods and precious metals to Gaul and Rome. The heavily branched river system in Britain enabled the Germanic invaders to quickly penetrate the interior of the island in their small flat boats. As a countermeasure the Roman administration created a separate military district covering both sides of the English Channel. During Carausius' short-lived Britannic Empire, these strategically important fortresses and naval stations were probably manned by his most loyal officers and soldiers, who could just as easily repel Roman invaders. The exact date of its formation, however, is unknown. However, the military situation in Britain, which was already difficult, worsened still further. The local army command had to face new threats without having enough soldiers available and was therefore forced to withdraw troops from other vulnerable areas of the island.

=== 4th Century ===
==== North ====
In the early 4th century, the Legio VI Victrix once more carried out upgrade work on their camp in Eburacum. The fortifications and towers were strengthened and other buildings such as the Principia were repaired. During the 4th century, the city continued to claim the status of the "capital of the North". In 368, army commander, count Theodosius, landed in Britannia where, on behalf of Emperor Valentinian I, he first of all overthrew the insurrection by Valentinus, then defeated a "barbarian conspiracy" of Picts, Scots and Anglo-Saxons and finally secured Hadrian's Wall again. In the fighting, the two commanders of the provincial army were killed.

In 383, the acting commander of the Provincial Army (comes britanniarum in praesenti), Magnus Maximus, was proclaimed as emperor by his troops. The trigger for this rebellion was supposedly the increasing irritation of the military with the emperor in the west, Gratian, who allegedly preferred Alani warriors to his own soldiers. However, a decisive factor was probably that the Roman troops on the island, who were involved in constant and costly minor wars with the Picts, Scots and Irish, felt that the Emperor had left them in the lurch. It was typical of troops engaged in constant combat to develop a great desire to be "near the emperor". Since Gratian was fully occupied with other crises in the empire, the Romano-British soldiers elected their commander as emperor without hesitation. For his subsequent campaign in Gaul, Maximus drew on a large number of garrison units stationed on the northern border. This meant that Hadrian's Wall from this point must have been almost unguarded and ceased to be a coherent and uniformly organized border security system. Some historians argue that Maximus also settled the first Anglo-Saxon foederati (allies) on the island. After the end of Maximus' brief reign, many of his soldiers did not return to Britain, but settled instead on the west coast of Gaul, in Bretannia or modern-day Brittany.

In 398/399 a Roman army was again transferred to Britain. The panegyrist, Claudian, reported that the West Roman magister militum, Stilicho, led a campaign against the Picts and Scots at Hadrian's Wall. The Comes Britanniarum clearly placed nine units of comitatenses under Stilicho. In 402, however, he withdrew most of these soldiers back to Italy to use against the rebellious West Gothic army of Alaric. Around this time, the praepositus, Justinian, had a tower replaced in the Roman camp of Ravenscar and had the last known Roman inscription in Britain placed on it for this occasion.

==== West ====
In the 4th century, western ports suffered from attacks by Irish pirates, particularly Cardiff, Caernarfon, Holyhead and Caerhun. This was not helped by a lack of defenders and it is thought that Magnus Maximus was responsible for the final withdrawal of most of the Roman troops from Wales. Welsh historical sources report that Maximus reorganized the defence of Britannia before departing for Gaul. He divided Wales into new military districts, which he then allocated either to regional tribal princes or to officers of the limitanei. It is unclear when the legion was transferred away from the camp in Caerleon; perhaps at the end of the third or towards the mid-fourth century. Coins found there with dates up to 370 prove there was a - possibly only civilian - continuous settlement until that time. The final coin dates from the reign of Theodosius (388-395). The military camp of Chester may also have been evacuated during this period.

==== Southeast ====
From the turn of the 3rd and 4th centuries, Frankish and Saxon pirates made mischief in the southeast of Britain. In the middle of the 4th century, responsibility for the security of this part of the coast was in the hands of a Comes ("count"). In 367, there was a joint invasion of Britain by several Barbarian tribes. The Roman provincial forces were wiped out almost entirely. Even their commanders were killed, including the "Count of the Coastal Areas". His remit was divided no later that around 395 into three military districts. This was done to prevent a military commander having too many units under his command and using them to order a rebellion, such as that usurpation by Carausius.

=== 5th Century ===
==== North ====
In the forts along Hadrian's Wall, no more Roman coins have been found in the excavation layers dating to after 407. Following the withdrawal of the Britannic field army between 407 and 410 by the usurper Constantine III the garrisons on the Wall probably lost troops as well. But it is unlikely that many soldiers from the north followed Constantine, as they were mostly born there and cultivated their own farms at their cantonment sites with their families. According to the Notitia Dignitatum, last amended in 420, the Wall appears to have been still guarded by regular limitanei until at least the early 5th century. They were at that time under the command of a dux (“duke”) who probably had significant military assets. Before leaving Britain, Magnus Maximus probably appointed a certain Coelius as the supreme commander on the northern border; he was the last to use the title Dux Britanniarum ("Duke of Britannia") introduced by the Romans. John Morris suspects that Coel Hen who, according to a Welsh tradition, was the ancestor of all Celto-British kings of the north, was in fact this Coelius. Archaeological finds prove that some forts along the Wall were still inhabited until the first half of the 5th century by the descendants of the Roman soldiers. Birdoswald was even continuously inhabited until the Early Middle Ages. In the course of time, most of them became fortified villages (oppida) or were used as quarries; a few milecastles were inter alia used as cattle pens. The southeast continued to be defended by the troops of the dux in Eburacum against attacks by the Picts and Scots. However, the administrative districts of the late Roman provinces in the south quickly became small independent kingdoms by inheritance, which is why the dux soon ceased to receive any material or financial contributions from there. In the early fifth century Eburacum became the metropolis of the Celto-British kingdom of Ebrauc. The dux and his followers were now also rulers of an independent statelet. The consequence of this was that he finally left the southeast to itself and intruders were only fought when they threatened his own territory.

==== Southeast ====
Even the Comes of the Saxon Shore did not join forces with Constantine's campaign to Gaul. He was probably able to maintain his defensive organization until the early 5th century. This part of Britain had most of the towns and the most highly developed commodity production. It is believed that military activity in the forts there continued well into the early 5th century. The Saxon Shore forts were probably no longer supplied from state magazines however. As on Hadrian's Wall, their garrisons, already largely composed of Germanii, managed small farms with their families and produced most of what they needed to live, themselves. As the pressure of Anglo-Saxon migration in Britain grew steadily and they slowly acquired land in the fertile lowlands, the Romano-British fled to the forts of the Saxon Shore, which were probably largely still intact. However, this only protected them temporarily from the invaders. One of them, Anderitum, was besieged and stormed by the Anglo-Saxons led by the first king of Sussex, Ælle (477-514), and his son, Cissa, in 491. The defenders were massacred to the last man. This is one of the rare surviving reports from the migration period of the successful siege of a fortified Roman settlement by new immigrants. In the Gallic Chronicles there is further evidence that the island had increasingly come under Anglo-Saxon domination no later than 440/441 - probably resulting from a rebellion of the foederati recruited by the provinces.

==== West ====
Because there was no central government in the south at that time, the local commanders conceded to the Irish their conquest of the Welsh coast and the remoter regions of Cornwall and Devon. At this time, there were probably still large Romano-British settlements in Wales, such as Carmarthen and Caerwent. After the collapse of Roman administration in the early fifth century, the ancient tribal communities were revived and the West disintegrated rapidly into little, independent, constantly warring kingdoms. Only around the larger cities of Chester, Wroxeter, Gloucester and Caerlon was the Roman way of life still maintained.

== Troops ==
As resistance - at least in the south - largely subsided in the late 1st century, Britannia stood out among the other provinces for the next 300 years on account of its massive military presence. Until the middle of the 2nd century, 10-12% of the Roman army was stationed there (Exercitus Britannicus), although it only constituted 4% of the entire Empire. Legions, auxiliary cohorts and the fleet were commanded by the respective incumbent provincial governors.

At its peak, the Roman army in Britannia probably comprised 35,000 to 40,000 men. Such a high number of soldiers can only partly be explained by the stubborn resistance of the British against Roman occupation. It is conceivable that Britannia's location on the margins of the Empire was seen as the ideal place e.g. to permanently isolate and occupy those legions potentially inclined to unrest. Even their commanders, the legati, were blamed on several occasions for their rebellious behavior.

Britain is surrounded by water, so it was not so easy to launch a rebellion against the emperor from there. Despite that, in 185 AD, 1,500 British lanciarii (javelin throwers) marched to the gates of Rome and murdered there the praetorian prefect of the Commodus, Tigidius Perennis, and his family. How the soldiers succeeded in freely penetrating to the heart of the Empire, without the imperial court taking appropriate countermeasures, remains a mystery even now. Perhaps those in Rome were too firmly convinced that troops in Britain were too far away to represent a serious threat. During the era of Gallic and British Empires in the 3rd century, the Britannic troops were always on the side of the usurpers.

=== Legions ===
In the first four decades after the invasion of 43, four legions were stationed in Britannia. Thereafter until the end of Roman rule, the number was reduced to three. Their headquarters were located in:

- Eburacum/York,
- Isca Silurum/Caerlon and
- Deva/Chester.

Taken together their total strength was around 15,000 men.

Period	Legion	Bases/Operations
1st to 5th centuries	Legio II Augusta	
1st century	Legio II Adiutrix Pia Fidelis	
2nd to 5th centuries	Legio VI Victrix Pia Fidelis	
1st and 2nd centuries	Legio IX Hispana	
1st century	Legio XIV Gemina Martia Victrix	
1st to 3rd centuries	Legio XX Valeria Victrix	

=== Auxiliary troops ===
More than half the Roman occupation troops in Britannia were recruited as auxiliary units (auxilia). Auxiliary units were only rarely mentioned in ancient literary sources. Under Hadrian there were 14 regiments of cavalry (ala, each about 500 strong) and 45 battalions of infantry (cohortes peditae, each about 480 strong) making up the auxiliary forces:

- civium Romanorum = Roman citizens
- equitata = partly mounted
- milliaria = 1,000 men strong

Cavalry	Mixed cavalry/infantry	Infantry	Infantry
ala Augusta Gallorum Petriana milliaria civium Romanorum ala Augusta Gallorum Proculeiana ala Augusta Vocontiorum ala Gallorum et Thracum classiana ala Picentiana Gallorum ala Hispanorum Vettonum ala Agrippina Miniata ala I Pannoniorum Sabiniana ala I Pannoniorum Tampiana ala I Hispanorum Asturum ala I Thracum ala I Tungrorum ala II Asturum ala II Gallorum Sebosiana	cohors I Augusta Nerviana Germanorum milliaria equitata cohors I Vangionum milliaria equitata cohors I Vardulorum civium Romanorum milliaria equitata cohors I Batavorum equitata cohors I Hispanorum equitata cohors I Aelia Hispanorum milliaria equitata cohors I Lingonum equitata cohors II Gallorum veterana equitata cohors II Lingonum equitata cohors II Tungrorum milliaria equitata cohors III Lingonum equitata cohors IV Lingonum equitata cohors IV Gallorum equitata	cohors I Menapiorum cohors I Morinorum cohors I Frisiavonum cohors I Baetasiorum civium Romanorum cohors I Celtiberorum cohors I Aelia classica cohors I Ulpia Cugernorum civium Romanorum cohors I Aelia Dacorum milliaria cohors I Delmatarum cohors II Asturum cohors II Delmatarum cohors III Bracaraugustanorum cohors IV Delmatarum cohors IV Breucorum cohors V Gallorum	cohors I Tungrorum milliaria cohors I Augusta Bracarum cohors I Aquitanorum cohors I Nauticarum cohors I Nerviorum cohors I Sunucorum cohors I Thracum cohors I Hamiorum sagittariorum milliaria (bowmen) cohors II Nerviorum cohors II Pannoniorum cohors II Thracum veterana cohors II Vasconum civium Romanorum cohors III Nerviorum cohors IV Nerviorum cohors VI Gallorum cohors VII Thracum

=== Fleet ===
The provincial navy, Classis Britannica, was responsible for the monitoring and surveillance of the waters around the British Isles. It was initially drawn from the naval forces deployed in the invasion. Its units operated mostly in close cooperation with the ground forces and also had a key role in supplying the provincial army with the necessary materiel. They played an important role especially in the campaigns of Gnaeus Julius Agricola in the north of the island. Its crews teams explored the coasts of Ireland and Scotland and circumnavigated Britain. With the construction of the limes on the Saxon Shore in the 3rd century the fleet became more important again. Vegetius, a chronicler who published his works in the late 4th century, mentions the existence of the provincial fleet at this time. The main task of its warships was to secure the strategically and economically important passage between the British and Gallic coast, i.e. from Dover to Calais. Its main port on the British side was initially probably Dubris/Dobra (Dover). Under Carausius, the Fleet Command was temporarily based in Portus Adurni (Port Chester), after which it was transferred to Rutupiae (Richborough).

== Literature ==
- Anthony R. Birley, The Roman government of Britain, Oxford University Press, 2005, ISBN 978-0-19-925237-4.
- Anthony R. Birley, The people of Roman Britain, University of California Press, 1980, ISBN 978-0-520-04119-6.
- Alan K. Bowman, Peter Garnsey, Dominic Rathbone (eds.): The Cambridge Ancient History. Vol. 11: The High Empire, A.D. 70-192. University Press, Cambridge, 2000, ISBN 0-521-26335-2.
- Kai Brodersen, Das römische Britannien. Spuren seiner Geschichte. Primus, Darmstadt, 1998, ISBN 3-89678-080-8.
- Geoff & Fran Doel, Terry Lloyd, König Artus und seine Welt. Ein Streifzug durch Geschichte, Mythologie und Literatur. Aus dem Englischen von Christof Köhler. 2nd edn. Sutton Verlag 2000, ISBN 3-89702-191-9.
- A. Simon Esmonde-Cleary, The Ending of Roman Britain, Routledge, 1991, ISBN 978-0-415-23898-4.
- Thomas Fischer, Die Armee der Caesaren. Archäologie und Geschichte. With contributions by Ronald Bockius, Dietrich Boschung and Thomas Schmidts. Verlag Friedrich Pustet, Regensburg, 2012, ISBN 978-3-7917-2413-3.
- Sheppard Frere, Britannia: a history of Roman Britain, Routledge, 1987, ISBN 978-0-7102-1215-3.
- Alexander Gaheis, "Iulius 49", Paulys Realencyclopädie der classischen Altertumswissenschaft (RE). Vol. X,1, Stuttgart, 1918.
- Alfred Michael Hirt, Imperial Mines and Quarries in the Roman World: Organizational Aspects 27 BC-AD 235 (Oxford Classical Monographs), Oxford University Press, Oxford, 2010, ISBN 978-0-19-957287-8.
- Richard Hobbs, Ralph Jackson, Das Römische Britannien, Theiss 2011, ISBN 978-3-8062-2525-9.
- Stephen Johnson, The Roman Forts of the Saxon Shore. 2nd edn.. Elek, London, 1979, ISBN 0-236-40165-3.
- Stephen Johnson, Late Roman fortifications. Batsford, London 1983, ISBN 0-7134-3476-7.
- Lawrence J. F. Keppie, Legions and veterans: Roman army papers 1971-2000 (Mavors. Roman Army Researches Band 12), Steiner, Stuttgart, 2000, ISBN 978-3-515-07744-6.
- Margot Klee, Grenzen des Imperiums. Leben am römischen Limes. Konrad Theiss Verlag, Stuttgart, 2006, ISBN 3-8062-2015-8.
- Wolfgang Kuhoff, Diokletian und die Epoche der Tetrarchie. Das römische Reich zwischen Krisenbewältigung und Neuaufbau (284–313 n. Chr.), Frankfurt am Main, 2001.
- Claude Lepelley (ed.), Rom und das Reich in der Hohen Kaiserzeit, Bd. 2: Die Regionen des Reiches, de Gruyter, Munich, 2001, ISBN 3-598-77449-4.
- Simon McDowall, Gerry Embleton, Late Roman Infantryman, 236–565 AD. Weapons – Armour – Tactics. Osprey Military, Oxford, 1994, ISBN 1-85532-419-9 (Warrior Series 9).
- John Morris, The Age of Arthur, Weidenfeld & Nicolson, London, 1973, ISBN 0-297-17601-3.
- Victor Erle Nash-Williams, The Roman frontier in Wales, University of Wales Press, 2nd edn., Cardiff, 1969.
- National Museums & Galleries of Wales (ed.): Birthday of the eagle: the second Augustan legion and the Roman military machine, 2002, ISBN 0-7200-0514-0.
- Peter Salway, History of Roman Britain, Oxford History of England, Oxford Paperbacks, 2001.
- Oliver Schmitt, Constantin der Große, Stuttgart and others, 2007.
- Matthias Springer, Die Sachsen. Kohlhammer Verlag, Stuttgart, 2004. ISBN 3-17-016588-7
- Ronald Syme, Tacitus. Vol. 1 (of 2). Oxford 1958.
- Malcolm Todd, Julius Agricola, Gnaeus. In: Oxford Dictionary of National Biography (ODNB). Vol. 30 (2004).
- John Stewart Wacher, Coming of Rome (Britain Before the Conquest), Routledge, 1979, ISBN 978-0-7100-0312-6.
- Alex Woolfe, Romancing the Celts: Segmentary societies and the geography of Romanization in the north-west provinces, in: Ray Laurence und Joanne Berry (eds.): Cultural Identity in the Roman Empire. Routledge, Oxford, 1998. ISBN 0-203-02266-1
