= Roman auxiliaries in Britain =

The overall size of the Roman forces in Roman Britain grew from about 40,000 in the mid 1st century AD to a maximum of about 55,000 in the mid 2nd century. The proportion of auxiliaries in Britain grew from about 50% before 69 AD to over 70% in c. 150 AD. By the mid-2nd century, there were about 70 auxiliary regiments in Britain, for a total of over 40,000 men. These outnumbered the 16,500 legionaries in Britain (three Roman legions) by 2.5 to 1. This was the greatest concentration of auxilia in any single province of the Roman Empire. It implies major continuing security problems; this is supported by the (thin) historical evidence. After Agricola, the following emperors conducted major military operations in Britain: Hadrian, Antoninus Pius, Septimius Severus, and Constantius I.

The early 2nd century may be summarised as follows:

ROMAN AUXILIARY REGIMENTS: Summary of known deployments c130 AD
Province	Alae (no. milliariae)	Cohortes (no. mill.)	Total units	XXX	Cavalry strength*	Infantry strength	Total auxilia	XXX	No legions	Legionaries (infantry)	XXX	TOTAL GARRISON
Britannia	11 (1)	45 (6)	56		10,688	25,520	36,208		3	15,360		51,568

Of the auxilia units stationed in Britain, none was originally native British (it was the custom not to deploy units in their home country or region). However, the majority came from the geographically and culturally close areas of northern Gaul and lower Rhineland (e.g., Batavi and Tungri. Although local recruitment resulted in a growing British element in these regiments, the Batavi at least continued to recruit heavily in their native area and inscription evidence supports the view that many regiments had an international membership.

An important deployment of auxiliary regiments in Britain was to garrison the forts and milecastles on Hadrian's Wall, outpost forts and supply routes. This focus switched to the Antonine Wall in Scotland for the period it was held; however, a number of forts in the Lowland area of Scotland were garrisoned throughout the 2nd century.

== Vindolanda Tablets ==
The discovery in the 1970s, and continuing unveiling of, the Vindolanda Tablets offer a unique glimpse into the everyday lives of auxiliary soldiers stationed in northern England in the period 85–122, just before the construction of Hadrian's Wall. These documents (752 of which have been published to date), consist of letters and memoranda written on wooden tablets to and from the auxiliary soldiers garrisoning the fort of Vindolanda (Chesterholm). The documents mainly relate to the Cohors I Tungrorum, a regiment originating among the Tungri tribe of the Ardennes region (Belgium/France/Luxembourg). The tablets have survived decomposition due to being deposited in anaerobic conditions.

The Tablets range from official unit reports and memoranda to the unit commander to personal correspondence. Of special interest are unit status reports (renuntiae). One such shows the milliary I Tungrorum as under-strength, with only 752 instead of the official 800 men on its rolls. This document also shows the flexibility of unit deployments: a detachment of 337 men is reported as stationed at another fort and 46 men on escort duty (singulares) with the provincial governor's staff. Further smaller detachments were at six other locations. In general, the Tablets show the Roman Empire was far more bureaucratised than previously thought, with likely millions of written documents generated every year by the army alone.

The Tablets are also of a more personal nature, with social letters between soldiers and their families and friends. They also established beyond reasonable doubt that Roman soldiers (at least auxiliaries) wore underpants (subligaria) and used a disparaging nickname for their British hosts: Brittunculi. In Latin, the suffix -unculus is both diminutive and pejorative: the term translates as "nasty little Britons". The author was probably not referring to the provincial population as a whole, but specifically to young trainee recruits to the regiment. Even so, the remark implies that indigenisation of the regiment was far from complete at that time. The seemingly common use of the Tablets implies that they may have been the normal writing material in the northwestern Empire, instead of the papyrus normally used in the Mediterranean.

== Regiments deployed in Britain ==
Table I(a): BRITANNIA: Auxiliary regiments deployed under Hadrian
ALAE	XXX	COHORTES	COHORTES	COHORTES
Agrippina Miniata; I Hispanorum Asturum; II Asturum; **Augusta Gallorum Petriana c.R.** Augusta Gallorum Proculeiana; Picentiana Gallorum; II Gallorum Sebosiana; Gallorum et Thracum Classiana; I Pannoniorum Sabiniana; I Pannoniorum Tampiana; I Thracum; I Tungrorum; Hispanorum Vettonum; Augusta Vocontiorum		I Alpinorum peditata I Aquitanorum; II Asturum eq IV Breucorum; I Augusta Bracarum; III Bracaraugustanorum; I Baetasiorum c.R. I Batavorum eq I Celtiberorum; I Aelia classica I Ulpia Cugernorum c.R. **I Aelia Dacorum**; I Delmatarum; II Delmatarum; IV Delmatarum; I Frisiavonum	II Gallorum veterana eq IV Gallorum eq V Gallorum; VI Gallorum; I Hispanorum eq **I Aelia Hispanorum eq** I Lingonum eq II Lingonum eq III Lingonum eq IV Lingonum eq I Menapiorum; I Morinorum; I nauticarum I **Augusta Nerviana Germanorum eq** I Nerviorum; II Nerviorum	III Nervorum; IV Nerviorum; II Pannoniorum; V Raetorum; I Sunucorum; I Thracum; II Thracum veterana VII Thracum; **I Tungrorum**; **II Tungrorum c.L. eq** **I Vangionum eq** **I Vardulorum c.R. eq** II Vasconum c.R. **I Hamiorum sagitt**

NOTE: Double-strength (milliary) regiments in bold type.

== See also ==
- List of Roman auxiliary regiments
