= Featherwood =

- Featherwood, Polyosma cunninghamii, a rainforest tree of eastern Australia
- Featherwood, a term of racial superiority from the United States, see Peckerwood
- Featherwood, a locality in Northumberland, England, near the archaeological site Featherwood Roman Camps
