= Chew Green =

Roman military installation in Northumberland, England

Chew Green (Ad Fines)
- Northumberland, England, UK
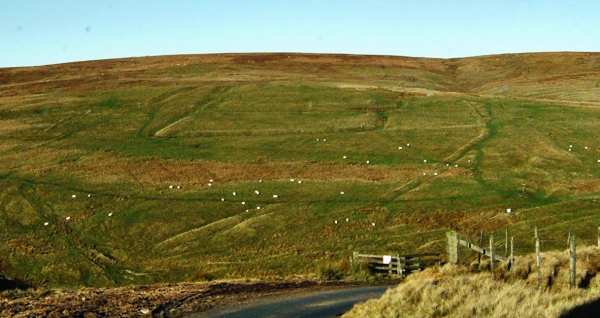
- Chew Green Roman camp

Location
- Location in Northumberland
- Coordinates: 55.371°N 2.337°W
- Grid reference: NT787086

Chew Green is the site of the ancient Roman encampment, commonly but erroneously called Ad Fines (Latin: The Limits) on the 1885-1900 edition of the Ordnance Survey map, in Northumberland, England, 8 miles (13 km) north of Rochester and 9 miles (14 km) west of Alwinton. The encampment was adjacent to Dere Street, a Roman road that stretched south to York (Eboracum), and almost on the present-day border with Scotland.

Archaeological excavation at Chew Green has uncovered a complex of Roman military camps consisting of a Roman fort, two fortlets, two camps and a section of Roman road. The Roman remains were overlaid with evidence of the medieval settlement of Kemylpethe that included a small chapel, although the evidence for this latter is based on reports of an undocumented excavation in the 1880s and must be regarded as insubstantial. The largest camp structure is a square that encloses about 17 acres (7 ha) with a defensive rampart and ditch. Evidence inside the fort indicates it was used as permanent settlement. The encampment likely served only as a military base, not a colonial settlement.

The site is within the Northumberland National Park and within the Military Training Area at Otterburn.

== See also ==
- Bremenium
- Featherwood Roman Camps
- Quintus Lollius Urbicus
- History of Northumberland
- Barrow Burn
- Windy Gyle
