= Habitancum =

Ancient Roman fort in Northumberland, England

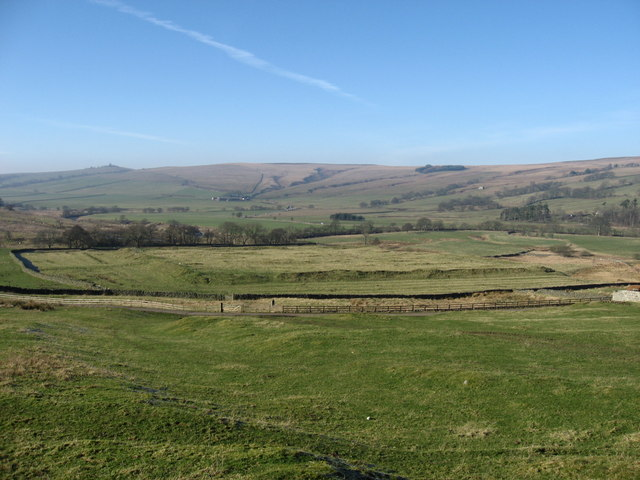
- Site of Habitancum Roman Fort

- Location within Northumberland
- 55.170°N 2.172°W
- Location: Risingham, Northumberland, England

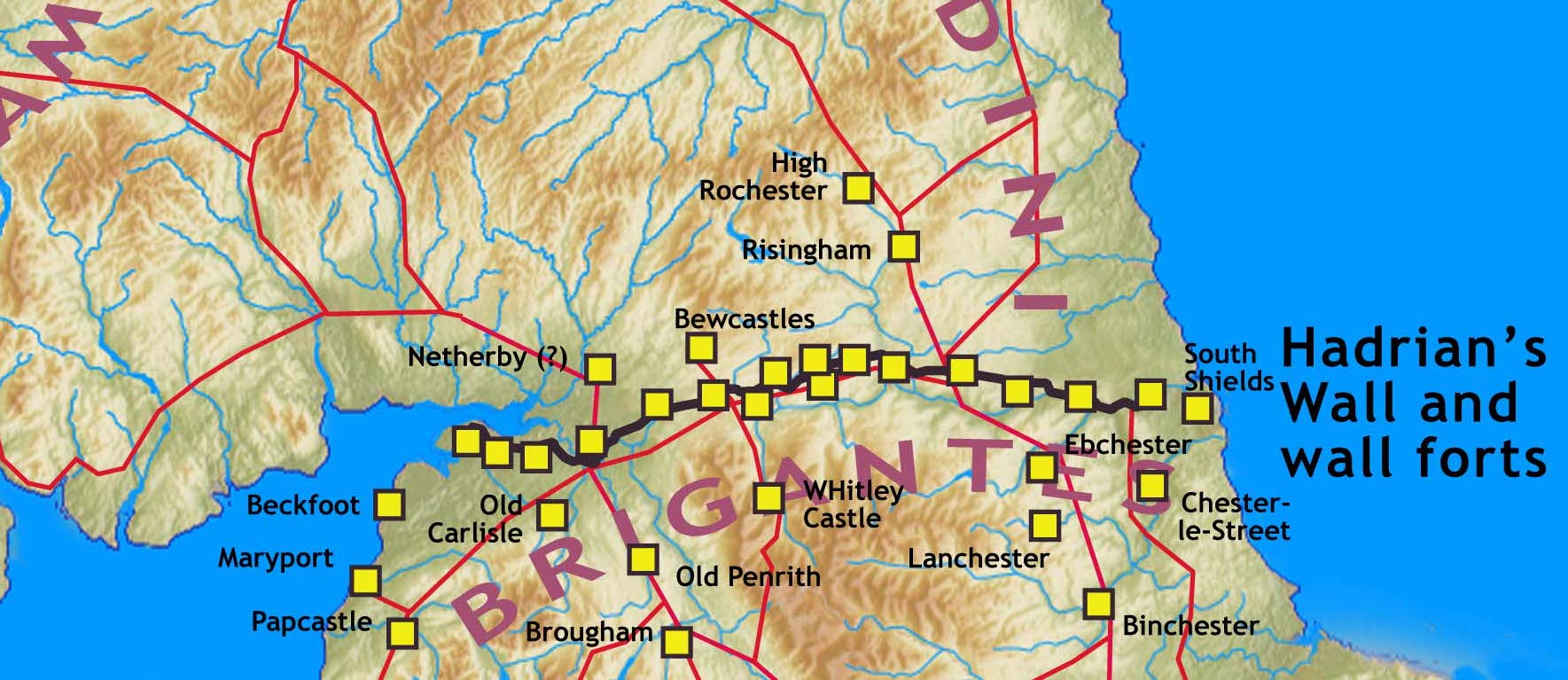
Roman forts in 270 AD

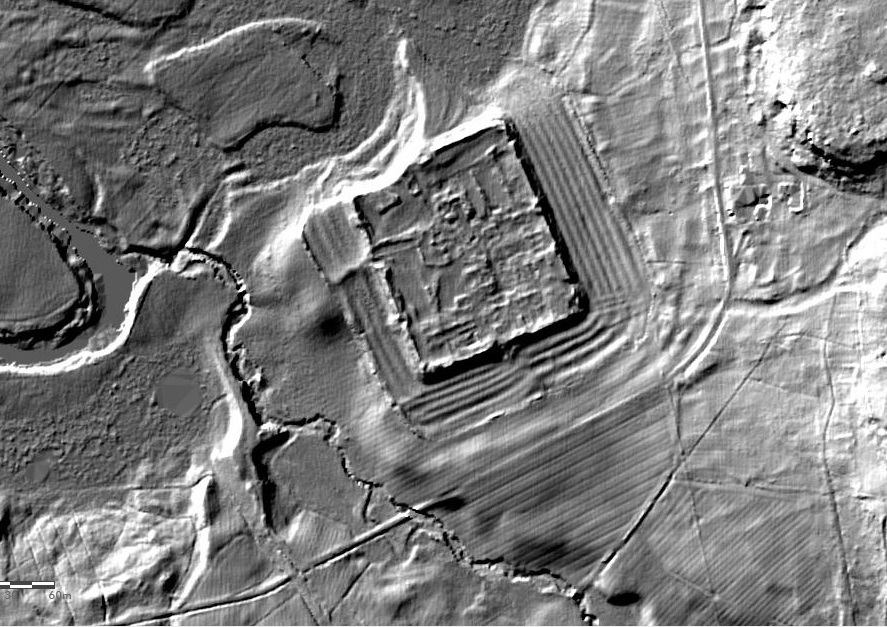
Lidar image of Habitancum

Habitancum was an ancient Roman fort (castrum) located at Risingham, Northumberland, England. The fort was one of series of built along the extension of Dere Street, a Roman road running from York to Corbridge and onwards to Melrose, in Scotland.

The fort's name is derived from the word Habitanci inscribed on an altar set up by Marcus Gavius Secundinus, a consular beneficiary on duty there. It is not mentioned in other sources such as the Notitia Dignitatum.

== Location ==
The fort is situated 13 miles (21 km) north of Corbridge (Coria) and 8 miles (13 km) south of Rochester (Bremenium), the next Roman forts on Dere Street. The fort occupies a low mound overlooking the River Rede. It is about 9 miles north of Hadrian's Wall

== History ==
The fort was built in the early Antonine period c. 138 AD when the frontier was re-established further north on the Antonine Wall. It was destroyed in c. 197 AD but was rebuilt under Septimius Severus by the First Cohort of Vangiones (nominally one thousand strong) in 205-8 on a different orientation to which the surviving earthworks belong. The fort was destroyed again in the late 3rd century and rebuilt under Constantius about 306. It was destroyed in 343, rebuilt and finally destroyed in about 368.

== Description ==
It is oblong in shape and measures 450 feet (140 m) north to south, and 400 feet (120 m) east to west, giving an area of just over 4 acres (16,000 m^{2}). It was surrounded by a number of ditches, which can still be seen on the south and west sides.

The fort had gates in the south and west walls. There may have been gates in the other walls but no sign of them has been found. The walls were of sandstone ashlar, backed by a clay bank thirty feet thick.

There was a substantial vicus (civil settlement) as testified by the numerous inscriptions.

== Garrison ==
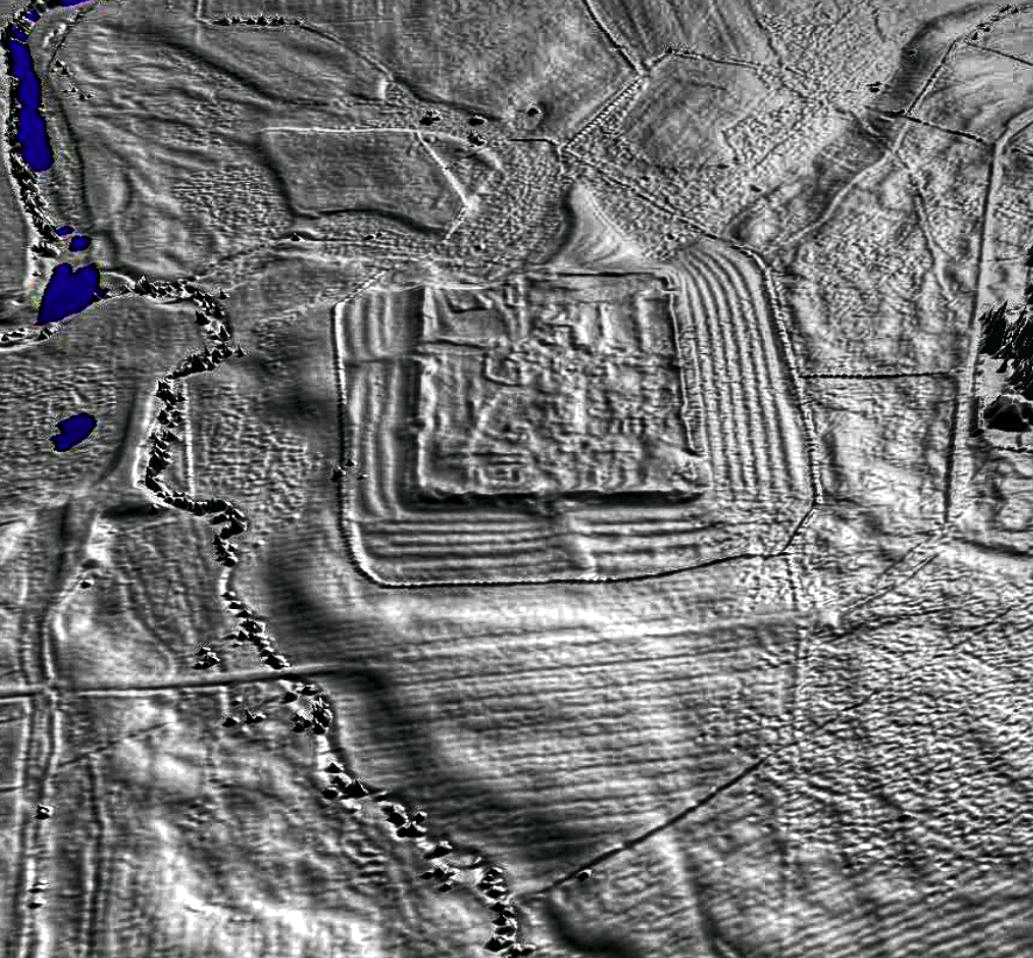
An oblique lidar view of Habitancum Roman fort and Corsenside Medieval settlement

The 2nd-century garrison is not known for certain, but may have been Cohors IV Gallorum equitata. The 3rd-century garrison was the First Cohort of Vangiones, as well as a Numerus Exploratorum (Unit of Scouts) and a detachment of Raeti Gaesati (pikemen).

== Current site ==
The only visible stone remains lie at the north-eastern corner angle, but the outlines of many buildings can easily be made out beneath a layer of turf in the fort's interior, as can the ditches on all sides.

== Sources ==
- J. Collingwood Bruce, Roman Wall (1863), Harold Hill & Son, ISBN 0-900463-32-5
- Frank Graham, The Roman Wall, Comprehensive History and Guide (1979), Frank Graham, ISBN 0-85983-140-X
- HABITANCVM Roman Fort and Marching Camps
