= Bremenium =

Roman fort in Northumberland, England

- Northumberland, England, UK
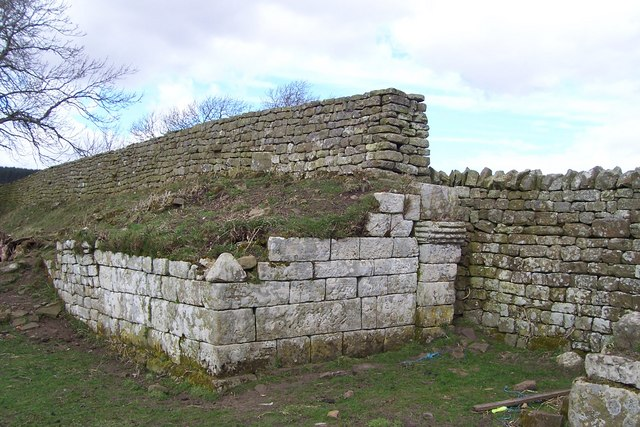
- Western gateway to Bremenium

Location
- Location in Northumberland
- Coordinates: 55.281°N 2.264°W
- Grid reference: NY832985

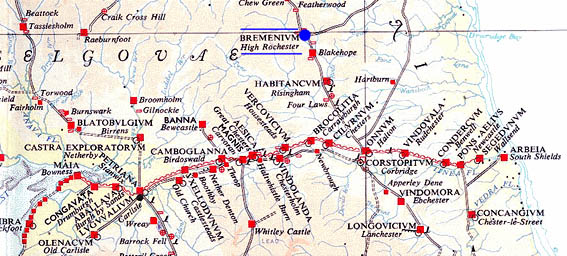
High Rochester and nearby forts

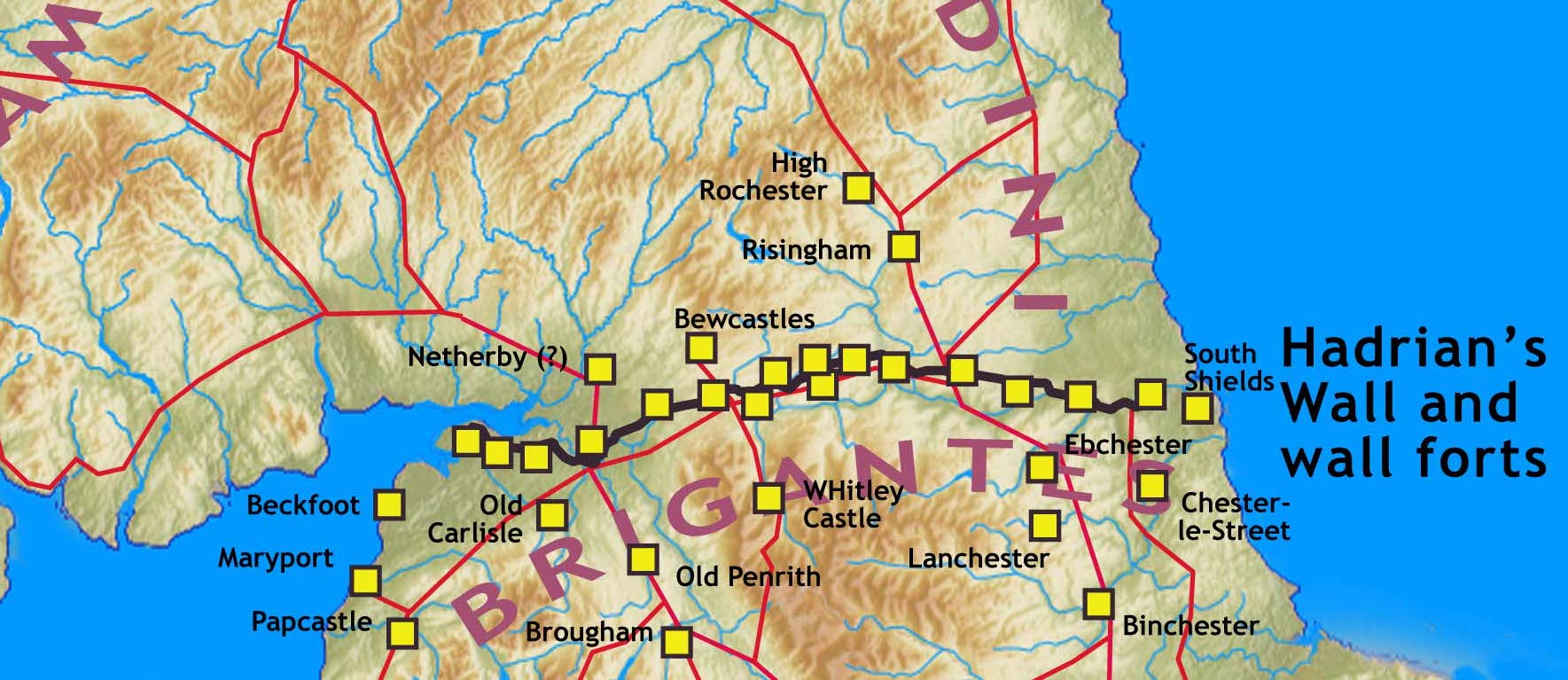
Forts in northern Britain 270 AD

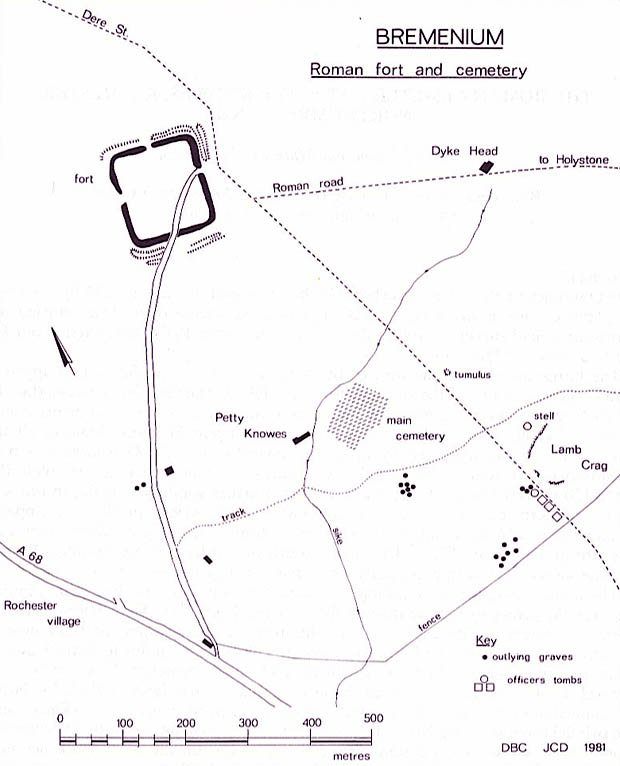
High Rochester surroundings and cemetery

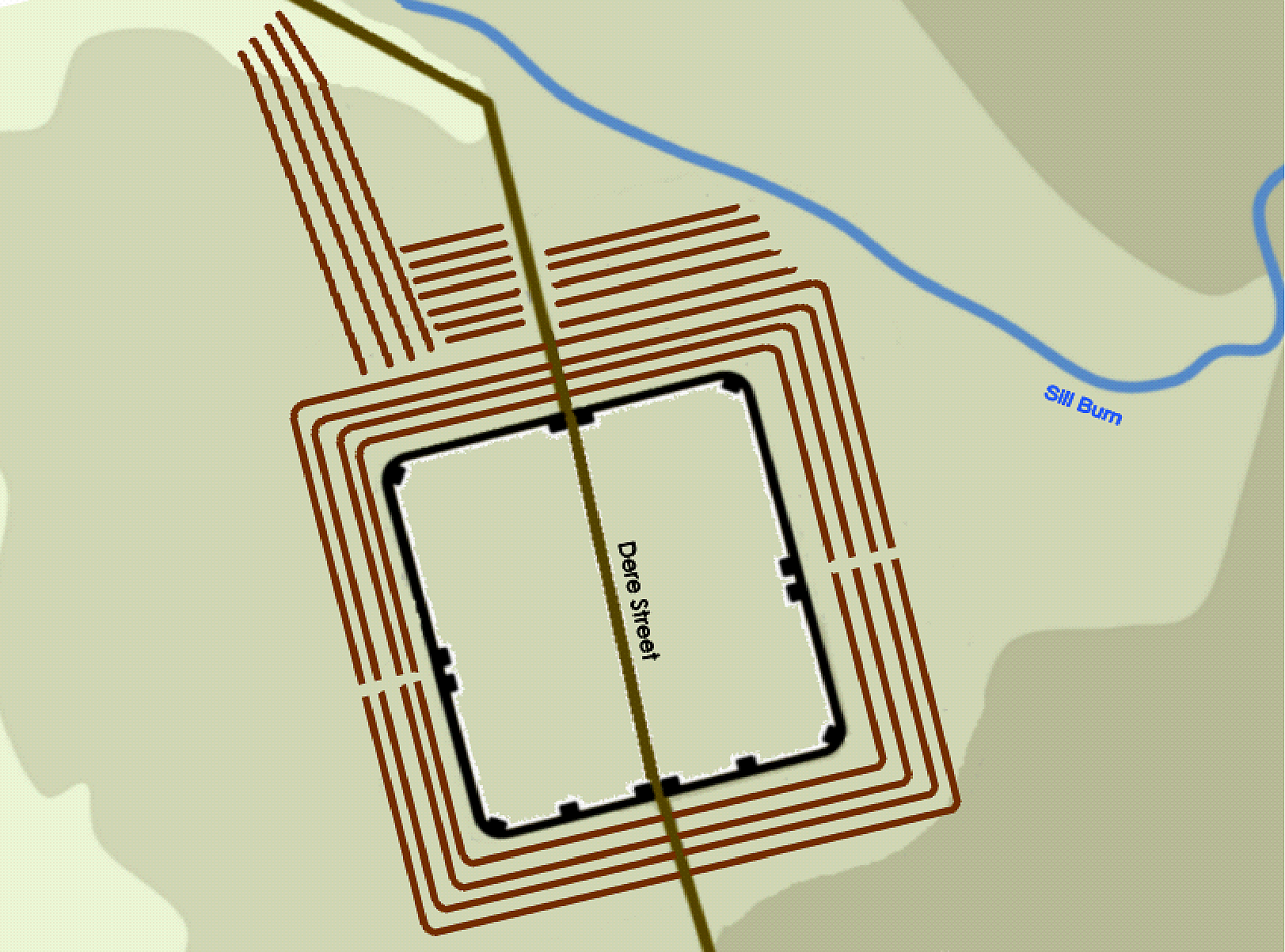
Defensive ditches at High Rochester

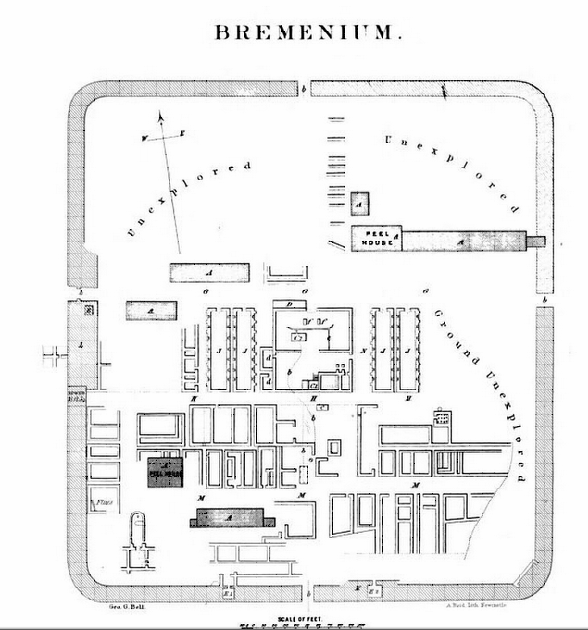
Bremenium groundplan (1902)

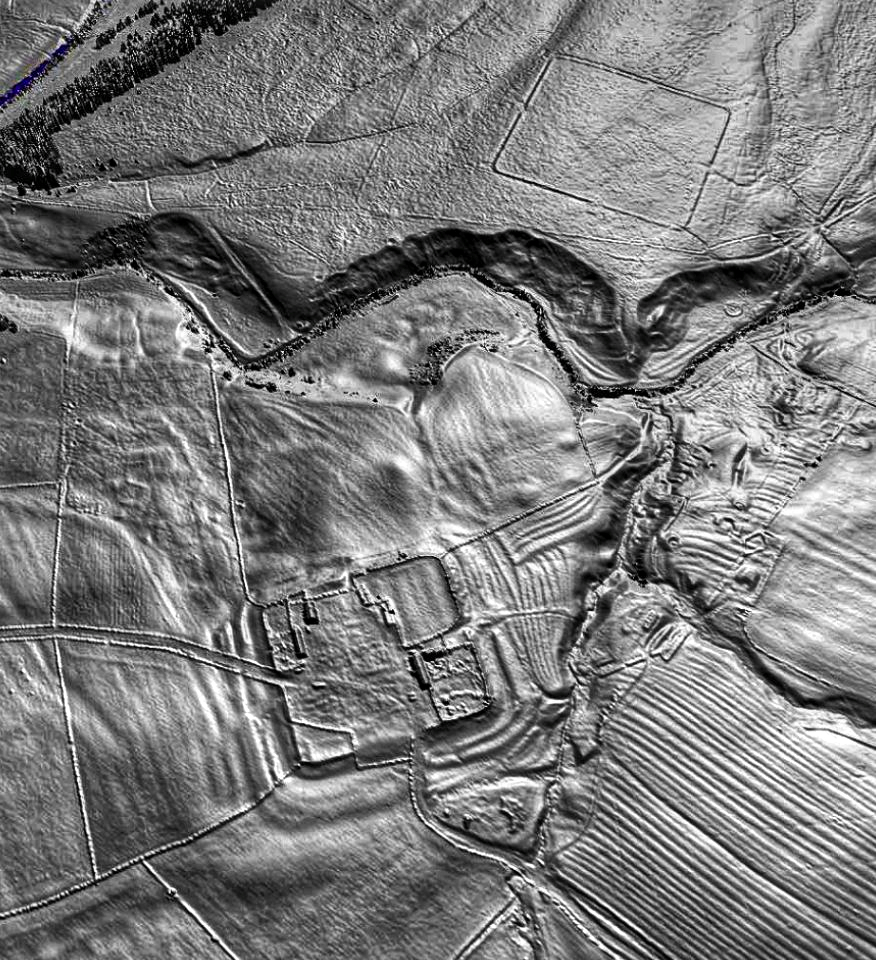
A lidar view of Bremenium Roman fort, vicus and Birdhope camps in Northumberland

Bremenium (High Rochester) is an ancient Roman fort (castrum) located at Rochester, Northumberland, England. The fort is part of the defensive system built along the extension of Dere Street, a Roman road running from York to Corbridge and onwards to Melrose. Significantly the fort is a long way north of Hadrian's Wall. It was one of the last forts north of Hadrian's Wall to remain occupied until the 270s.

The fort's name, Bremenium, is mentioned in the Ravenna Cosmography, the Antonine Itinerary and Ptolemy's Geographia.

A separate Roman road ran eastwards from Bremenium to the Roman fort at Learchild, where it joined up with the Devil's Causeway Roman road to Berwick upon Tweed.

== Location ==
The fort is situated in the village of Rochester, five miles (8.0 km) north-west of Otterburn on the A68 road between Corbridge and Jedburgh.

It was one of the forts along Dere Street, and positioned to defend this main supply and transit route to the north.

== Historical background ==
In 79 AD Agricola moved against the Brigantes of northern England and the Selgovae along the southern coast of Scotland, using overwhelming military power to establish Roman control. He built a network of military roads and forts to secure the Roman occupation and Bremenium was built around 80 AD. Existing forts were strengthened and new ones planted in northeastern Scotland along the Highland Line, consolidating control of the glens that provided access to and from the Scottish Highlands. The line of military communication and supply across southeastern Scotland and northeastern England was Dere Street (on which Bremenium was located) which was well-fortified.

After Agricola was recalled from Britain in 84 AD the Romans retired to a more defensible line along the Forth–Clyde isthmus. In the 120s Hadrian established the frontier further south by building his wall, and Bremeniun remained outside it as an "outpost" fort.

The emperor Antoninus Pius advanced again in the 140s and built the Antonine Wall, when Bremenium once again became a supply and logistical waypoint on Dere Street until about 164 when Hadrian's wall became the frontier again leaving Bremenium in hostile territory.

== Description ==
The fort is 8 1/2 miles (14 km) north of Risingham (Roman name Habitancum), the next fort on Dere Street and less than a day's marching distance away. The name Bremenium means 'The Place of the Roaring Stream'. The site is in a strong position, occupying the end of a ridge with the ground falling away steeply to the north and west, and giving a clear view over the Rede Valley and beyond.

Defensive ditches can still be seen to the north and east, outside which Dere Street passes. Early temporary marching camps at Redesdale are visible across the Sills Burn from the fort.

The fort is oblong in shape, and measures 485 feet (148 m) north to south and 445 feet (136 m) east to west, giving and area of just over 5 acres (20,000 m^{2}). There was a gate in each of the four walls, which were of stone backed by a bank of earth. It appears that an early 1st-century fort with a turf rampart occupied the site, and that it was replaced by a stone fort during the time that Quintus Lollius Urbicus was Governor of Britain. He stayed there on his way north to build the Antonine Wall in 142 AD. The fort remained occupied even after the abandonment of the Antonine Wall in the early 160s.

The fort is unusual, in that it had 3rd-century artillery defences. The walls were thicker than most Roman forts and had stone platforms projecting 32 feet (9.8 m) back from the wall, on which were placed catapult-like machines for hurling missiles. These machines, a smaller version of the ballista, were known as 'onagri', and derived their power from the torsion of a hair rope. From the north walls, these machines could shoot missiles at anyone advancing down Dere Street from the north.

== Garrison ==
In the 2nd century the garrison was the First Cohort of Lingones (part-mounted and 500 strong), and then the First Cohort of Dalmatians (infantry). In the 3rd century the garrison was the First Cohort of Vardulians (part-mounted and one thousand strong).

== Current site ==
The fort is now part of the village green of Rochester, but there are still remains to see. The west wall is the best preserved and consists of a nine-feet-high bank with stone facing. The west gate is complete to the springing of the arch. However, much of the stonework has been plundered over the years for local buildings.

== Excavations ==
Excavations were carried out in 1852 and 1855, but were poorly recorded. A small dig was also carried out in 1935. The excavations established that the interior of the fort was crowded with buildings, many with hypocausts.

In July 2025, a student from Newcastle University unearthed a medieval gold object of about 4cm, and was found close to the route of Dare Street, which ran between York and Edinburgh.

In the summer of 2026, during an annual training excavations of Newcastle University's Archaeology students, a range of roman artifacts were unearthed including gold jewellery, inscriptions and a finely carved gemstone. most notably was a 7-cm long Roman gold chain section measuring about 7-cm that was unearthed by a first-year student.

== See also ==
- Chew Green
- Featherwood Roman Camps

== Sources ==
- Tacitus, Publius Cornelius (1897) [98], The Germany and the Agricola of Tacitus (revised translation, with notes), C. M. Barnes Company
- J. Collingwood Bruce, Roman Wall (1863), Harold Hill & Son, ISBN 0-900463-32-5
- Frank Graham, The Roman Wall, Comprehensive History and Guide (1979), Frank Graham, ISBN 0-85983-140-X
- BREMENIVM Roman Fort and Marching Camps http://www.roman-britain.co.uk/places/bremenium/
- Bremenium Dedication Slab
- Northern Outpost
