= Featherwood Roman Camps =

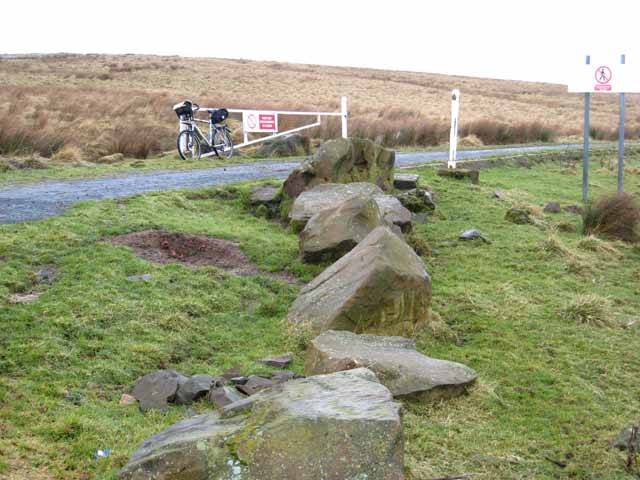
- Featherwood East Roman Camp

- Location within Northumberland
- 55°20′42″N 2°17′26″W
- Periods: Roman Britain, 1st century AD
- Location: near Byrness, Northumberland
- OS grid reference: NT 816 057

Scheduled monument
- Designated: 22 March 1962
- Reference no.: 1008881

Scheduled monument
- Designated: 22 March 1962
- Reference no.: 1008882

Featherwood Roman Camps are neighbouring archaeological sites in Northumberland, England, 1 mile (1.6 km) north of Featherwood and about 3 miles (5 km) east of Byrness. The remains of two Roman camps, near Dere Street, are scheduled monuments.

== Description ==
The two camps, about 500 metres (1,600 ft) apart, are situated on either side of Dere Street, a Roman road in use between AD 78 and AD 211 running from Eboracum (York) into Scotland. The camps date from the 1st century AD. They are thought to have been used by soldiers advancing northwards, and by smaller groups employed in routine maintenance. Chew Green and Bremenium, nearby Roman encampments on Dere Street, lie to the north and south.

=== Featherwood East Roman Camp ===
The camp, at grid reference NT 82017 05629, is on a spur of land, gently sloping to the south. The remains survive to a height of 0.5 metres (1 ft 8 in) in places. It is almost square, with rounded corners; it measures about 396 metres (1,299 ft) west to east by 400 metres (1,300 ft) north to south, enclosing 15.9 hectares (39 acres). There is a rampart about 3.8 metres (12 ft) wide, with an external ditch. On each side there is a gateway 5 metres (16 ft) wide; they are defended by external earthworks.

=== Featherwood West Roman Camp ===
The camp, at grid reference NT 81334 05818, is on a south-facing slope near the summit of Foulplay Head, with good views to the north-east, east and south. Because of the terrain, it has an irregular, trapezoidal shape, with the usual rounded corners, measuring 488 metres (1,601 ft) north to south by 366 metres (1,201 ft) west to east, enclosing 15.6 hectares (39 acres). There is a rampart up to 7 metres (23 ft) wide, with an external ditch visible in places. There are five gateways, the additional gateway being on the north-west side; they are defended by external earthworks.
