= Cohors IV Gallorum equitata =

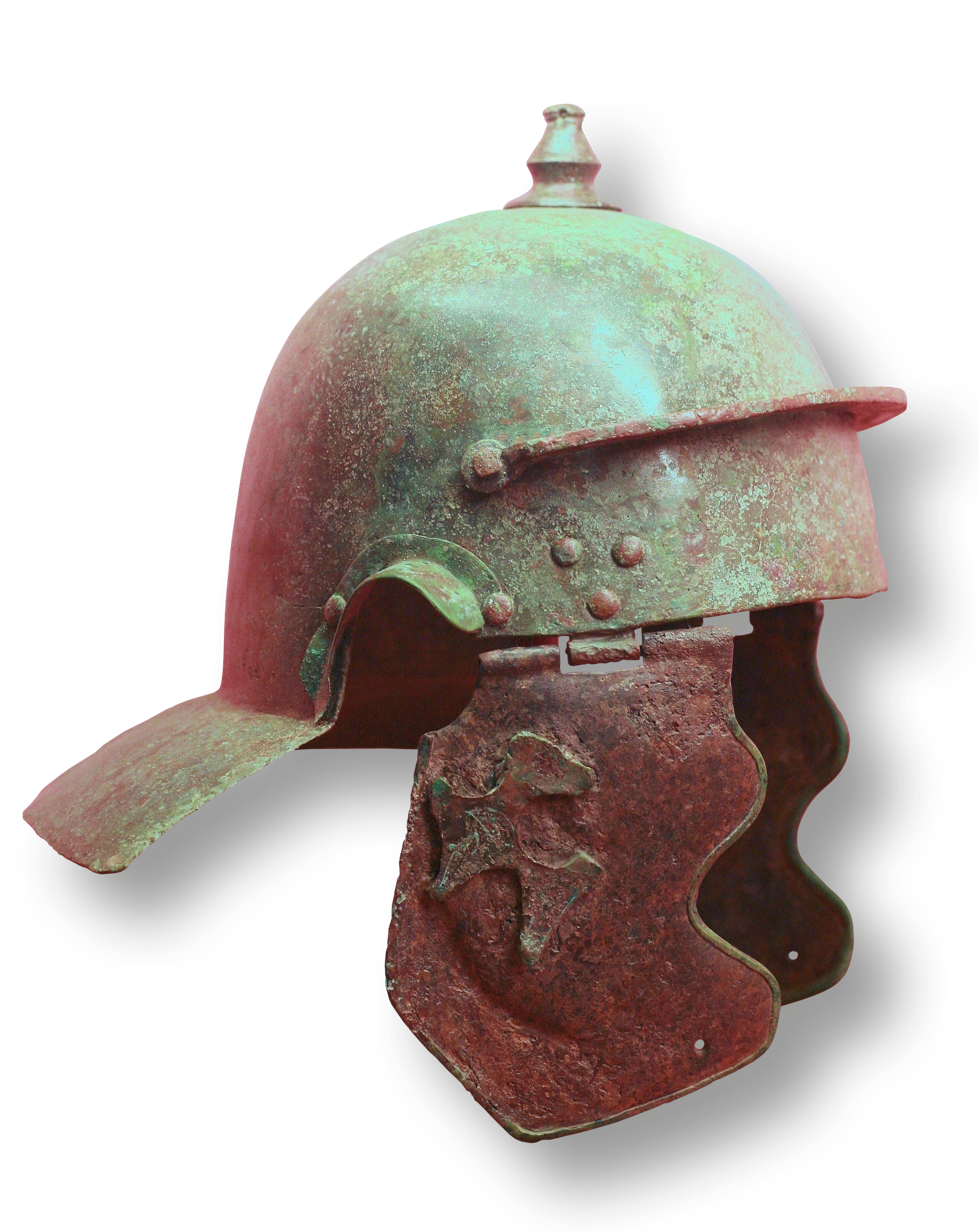
- Roman infantry helmet (late 1st century)
- Active: early 1st century to early 5th century
- Country: Roman Empire
- Type: Roman auxiliary cohort
- Role: infantry/cavalry
- Size: 600 men (480 infantry, 120 cavalry)
- Garrison/HQ: 75-105 Moesia Inferior; 114 Thracia; 122 – early 5th century Britannia
- Engagements: prob. Dacian Wars (99–106)

Cohors quarta Gallorum equitata ("4th part-mounted Cohort of Gauls") was a Roman auxiliary cohort containing both infantry and cavalry contingents.

== History ==
A recreation of Templeborough Roman Fort in Britannia. A tile stamped by Cohors IV Gallorum was discovered at the former fort.

It was probably raised in Gallia Lugdunensis by emperor Augustus (30 BC – 14 AD). It is first attested in Moesia in 75 AD and was still in Moesia Inferior in 105. It therefore probably took part in emperor Trajan's Dacian Wars (99–106). After a brief stay in Thracia (where it is attested in 114), it was transferred to Britannia not later than 122.

In Britannia, the regiment was stationed in various forts. In the 3rd century it is attested, from 213 onwards, in the fort at Vindolanda (Chesterholm) near Hadrian's Wall, but the regiment's inscriptions have also been found, undatable, at Risingham, Templeborough, Castlehill, Castlesteads and High Rochester. According to Holder, the sequence was Castlehill 144–60, Risingham 160–80 and then at Vindolanda. Castlehill was a fort on the Antonine Wall in Caledonia (Scotland) that was held for only 20 years by the Romans.

Its last datable attestation is in 276–82 at Vindolanda. But the Notitia Dignitatum, a late Roman official document, records a cohors IV Gallorum at Vindolanda under the dux Britanniarum, the commander of limitanei (border forces) along Hadrian's Wall. The Western section of the Notitia was drawn up in the 420's but the British units must date to before 410, when the island was evacuated by the Roman army.

The names of ten praefecti (regimental commanders) are preserved, of which the origin of just one is certain: Quintus Petronius Urbicus from Brixia (Brescia) in northern Italy (c. 220). Of the common ranks, the origin of just one is known: an Illyrian eques (common cavalryman), C. Iulius Valens of the Tralli tribe, attested in 114.

== See also ==
- List of Roman auxiliary regiments
