= Cohors I Delmatarum =

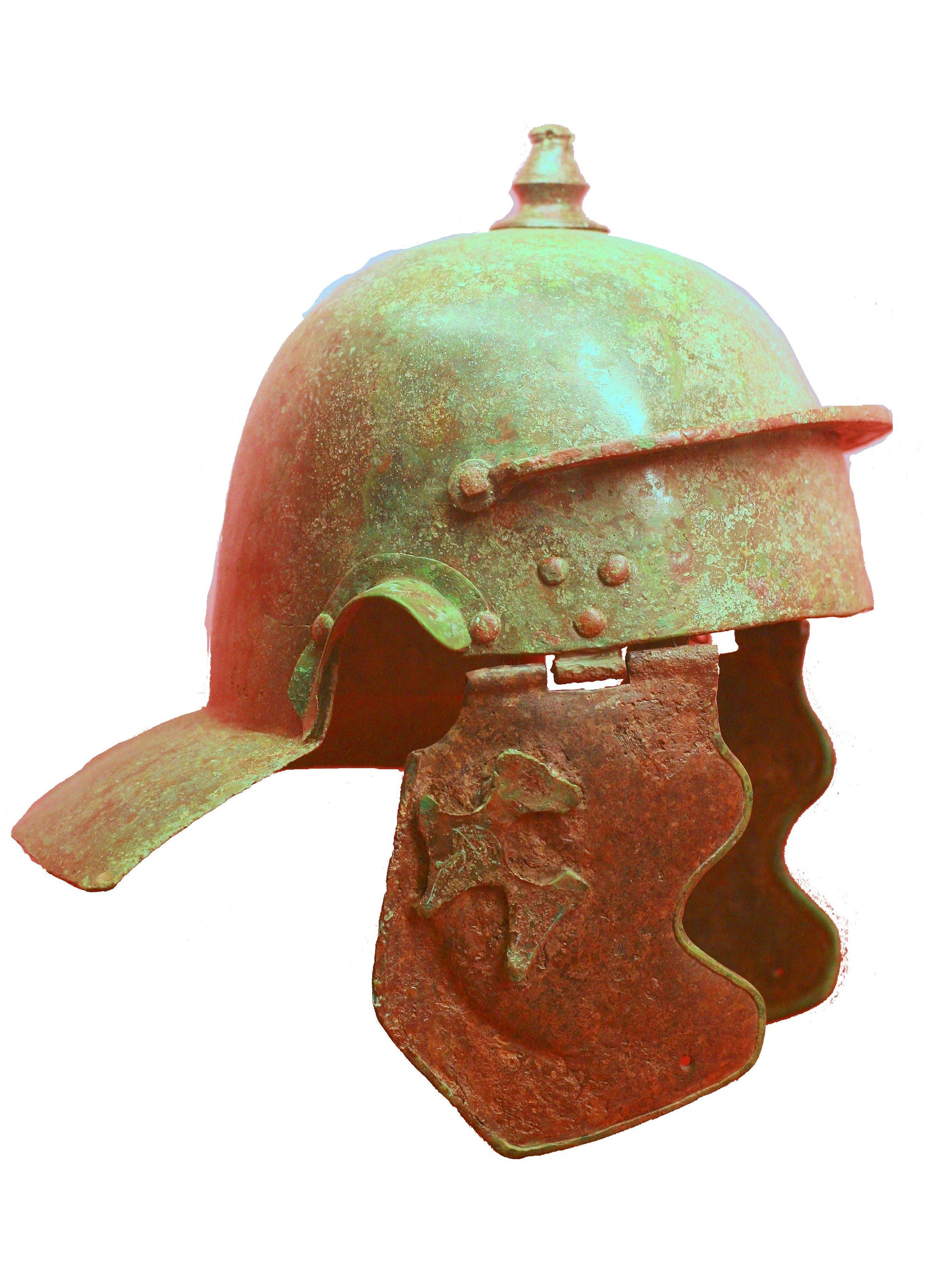
- Roman infantry helmet (late 1st century)
- Active: early 1st century to at least mid-2nd century
- Country: Roman Empire
- Type: Roman auxiliary cohort
- Role: infantry
- Size: 480 men
- Garrison/HQ: Britannia 122–161

Cohors prima Delmatarum ("1st Cohort of Dalmatae") was a Roman auxiliary infantry regiment. It is named after the Dalmatae, an Illyrian-speaking tribe that inhabited the Adriatic coastal mountain range of the eponymous Dalmatia. The ancient geographer Strabo describes these mountains as extremely rugged, and the Dalmatae as backward and warlike. He claims that they did not use money long after their neighbours adopted it and that they "made war on the Romans for a long time". He also criticises the Dalmatae, a nation of pastoralists, for turning fertile plains into sheep pasture. Indeed, the name of the tribe itself is believed to mean "shepherds", derived from the Illyrian word delme ("sheep"). The final time this people fought against Rome was in the Illyrian revolt of 6–9 AD. The revolt was started by Dalmatae auxiliary forces and soon spread all over Dalmatia and Pannonia. The resulting war was described by the Roman writer Suetonius as the most difficult faced by Rome since the Punic Wars two centuries earlier. But after the war, the Dalmatae became a loyal and important source of recruits for the Roman army.

According to Holder, a total of 12 Cohortes Delmatarum appear to have been raised after the suppression of the Illyrian revolt in two series, of 7 and 5 respectively. All these units were in existence by the time of emperor Claudius (r. 41–54) Of these, 9 appear to have survived into the 2nd century.

The regiment was probably raised by founder-emperor Augustus (r. 30BC – 14AD) after 9 AD. It was certainly in existence by the time of Claudius (r. 41–54). Its early movements are unknown. Holder suggests that the regiment may have taken part in the Roman invasion of Britain (43) or the suppression of the revolt of Boudicca (61), but there is no evidence. It first appears in the datable epigraphic record in 122, in Britannia. It was still there in 138–61, the time of its last datable inscription. It is attested in the following Roman forts in Britannia: High Rochester, Maryport (138–61) and Chesters (138–61).

The names of 12 praefecti (regimental commanders) are attested. From the locations of their votive or funerary stones, it can be deduced that at least 4 were central/southern Italians: from Aquino, Beneventum, the city of Rome (c. 120), and Tusculum. Another was a member of the Santones Gallic tribe of western Gaul, and one from Baláca (Pannonia). In addition, a centurio (infantry officer) is attested.

== See also ==
- List of Roman auxiliary regiments
