= Cohors II Gallorum veterana equitata =

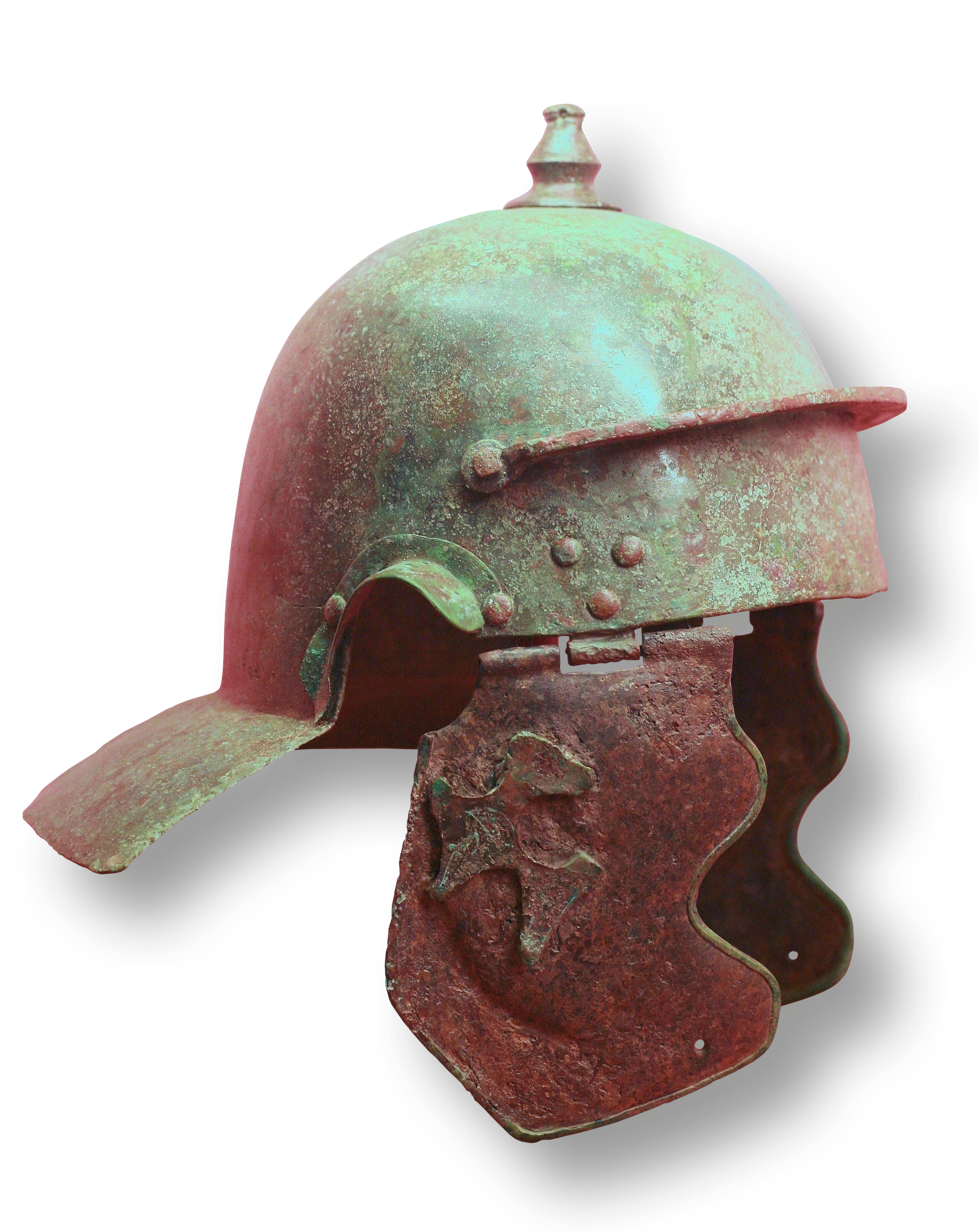
- Roman infantry helmet (late 1st century)
- Active: Not later than AD 14 to at least 244
- Country: Roman Empire
- Type: Roman auxiliary cohort
- Role: infantry/cavalry
- Size: 600 men (480 infantry, 120 cavalry)
- Garrison/HQ: Moesia Inferior 99-106; Mauretania Caesariensis 107; Britannia 122- at least 244
- Engagements: prob. Dacian Wars (99-106)

Cohors secunda Gallorum veterana equitata ("2nd part-mounted veteran Cohort of Gauls") was a mixed infantry and cavalry regiment of the Auxilia corps of the Imperial Roman army. It was stationed, in the 2nd and 3rd centuries, in a fort near Hadrian's Wall in Britain.

== Foundation ==
The regiment was probably constituted under Augustus, the founder of the Roman Empire (r. 30 BC - AD 14). It was originally recruited from natives of Gallia Lugdunensis (northern/central France).

== Structure ==
The regiment was 600 men strong, of which 480 were infantry (divided into 6 centuriae of 80 men each); and 120 cavalry (4 turmae of 30 horse each).

== Garrisons ==
The unit is first attested in the datable epigraphic record in AD 99 in Moesia Inferior (N. Bulgaria) It was briefly stationed in Mauretania Caesariensis (N Algeria), where it is attested for 107. From not later than 122 until its last known attestation of 244-9, it was in Britannia, and thus saw the building of Hadrian's Wall (122-32).

In Britannia, the regiment garrisoned, from not later than 178 until at least 244, the fort at Old Penrith (Cumbria), near the Wall. The regiment's last extant inscription dates from 244/9.

== Campaigns ==
=== Trajan's Dacian Wars (101-6) ===
Given the regiment's station on the lower Danube in AD 99, scholars consider it highly likely that it participated in the Conquest of Dacia by the emperor Trajan (r. 98-117). This was effected by two campaigns (101-2 and 105-6).

=== Campaigns in Britain (122-248) ===
In view of its size and long-term stationing on the northern British frontier, facing the unconquered Caledonia (Scotland), the regiment almost certainly participated in all the major campaigns recorded in this turbulent region, including:

- 139-42: Antoninus Pius (r. 138-61) launches an aggressive strategy to re-occupy the Scottish Lowlands, as far as the Forth-Clyde line, which had been abandoned under the emperor Trajan (r. 98-117). Governor Quintus Lollius Urbicus leads the campaign. Coins record victory in 142/3 over the Caledonian tribes of the region, especially the Selgovae. The campaign is followed by the construction of the Antonine Wall.
- 154-8: Serious disturbances break out in northern Britain, probably centred on a revolt by the Brigantes, most of whom reside south of Hadrian's Wall. The Romans are forced to withdraw troops from the Antonine Wall to suppress the revolt. This war probably leads to the decision to abandon the Antonine Wall by 162.
- 181-5: The Caledonian tribes overrun Hadrian's Wall. The emperor Commodus (r. 180-92) rushes reinforcements under Lucius Ulpius Marcellus to repel the invasion. In 184, Commodus assumes the title Britannicus to celebrate victory.
- 196-7: The governor of Britain, Decimus Clodius Albinus, launches a bid to seize imperial power. He leads the British army to Gaul to challenge the Danubian army under emperor Lucius Septimius Severus (r. 193-211). Frere argues that Albinus would probably have needed to take virtually every single Roman soldier from Britain for his campaign (his army reportedly numbered 150,000, but this is probably an exaggeration, as the entire army in Britain at this time probably totalled c. 50,000. Also, Albinus failed to win the support of the Rhine army). Albinus and his army were defeated in a hard-fought battle at Lugdunum (Lyon) and Albinus executed.
- 208-11: Emperor Septimius Severus launches a massive campaign to conquer the whole of Caledonia, similar to that of governor Gnaeus Julius Agricola in 77-85, over a century earlier. However, from the evidence of Severan-era marching-camps along the east coast of Scotland, it does not appear that Severus' army advanced as far as north as Agricola's, which had reached Inverness. Severus' gains were abandoned by his son and successor Caracalla (r. 211-8).

== Honours ==
The regiment was accorded two honorific titles:

- veterana ("veteran"), which appears on a number of military diplomas dated AD 178. The reason for this unusual title is unclear. Holder argues that it reflects the fact that, in 178, the unit was the senior infantry unit in Britannia province.
- Severiana Alexandriana. This title was conferred by the emperor Severus Alexander (r. 223-35), presumably for valour in the field and/or loyalty to the emperor.

== Religious cults ==
Votive altars dedicated by the regiment's commanders reflect the official cults of the Roman army. Of 4 such found, 2 are dedicated to Jupiter, the highest Roman god. Of these one was co-dedicated to the genius ("Spirit") of the emperor Philip the Arab (r. 244-9). 1 altar each was dedicated to Minerva and to Mars, the Roman god of war. However, Mars is accorded the epithet Belatucadrus, thus co-honouring a local deity, the Celtic god Belatucadros.

An altar dedicated by a German vexillatio ("detachment") of the regiment demonstrates the more local cults followed by the unit's ordinary soldiers. It is dedicated to "the goddess Tramari(s)", one of the Celtic Deae Matres ("Mother goddesses") revered in all of northwestern Europe.

== Attested personnel ==
Datable personnel of Cohors I Aelia Dacorum
Date of inscription	Name	Military rank	Social status	Nation/tribe	Birthplace	Notes
99	Titus Visulanius Crescens	Praefectus (regimental commander)	Roman knight	Italian	Bologna	Subsequently commanded Cohors I civium Romanorum in Germania Superior and Ala Moesica in Germania Inferior
2nd century	Valerius Laetus	Praefectus	Roman knight	Italian	Ocriculum	
2nd century	Lucius Naevius Verus Roscianus	Praefectus	Roman knight	Italian	near Piacenza	
178	Titus Domitius Hiero	Praefectus	Roman knight	Greek/Bithynian	Nicomedia	
c. 200	Aurelius Attianus	Praefectus	Roman knight			
223-225	Aurelius (-)	Praefectus	Roman knight			
3rd century	Iulius Lupus	Praefectus	Roman knight			
3rd century	Gaius Bellicius Primus	Praefectus	Roman knight	Italian	Verona	
XXXX
3rd century	Iulius Augustalis	Immunis (Specialist)				Actor (secretary) to prefect Iulius Lupus
XXXX
99	Marcus Antonius Rufus	Pedes (infantryman)	Roman citizen?	Mysian		
178	Dacus	Eques (cavalry trooper)		Dacian		Name means "the Dacian". Prob. adopted nickname as official since native name unpronounceable to Romans

== See also ==
- List of Roman auxiliary regiments
