= Cohors II Delmatarum =

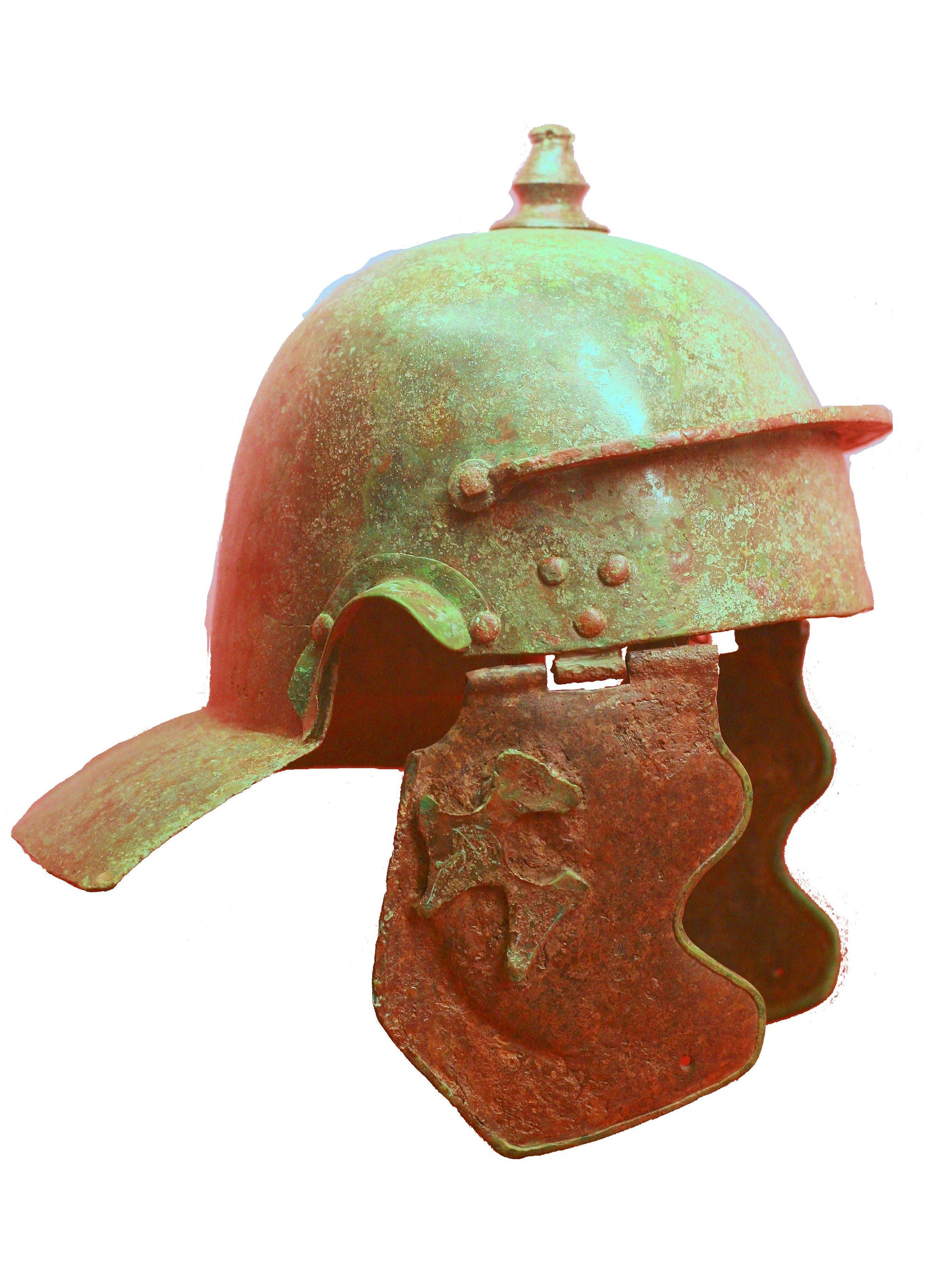
- Roman infantry helmet (late 1st century)
- Active: early 1st century to 4th century
- Country: Roman Empire
- Type: Roman auxiliary cohort
- Role: infantry
- Size: 480 men
- Garrison/HQ: Britannia 105 - 4th century

Cohors secunda Delmatarum ("2nd Cohort of Dalmatae") was a Roman auxiliary infantry regiment.

== Etymology ==
It is named after the Dalmatae, an Illyrian-speaking tribe that inhabited the Adriatic coastal mountain range of the eponymous Dalmatia. The ancient geographer Strabo describes these mountains as extremely rugged, and the Dalmatae as backward and warlike. He claims that they did not use money long after their neighbours adopted it and that they "made war on the Romans for a long time". He also criticizes the Dalmatae, a nation of pastoralists, for turning fertile plains into sheep pasture. Indeed, the name of the tribe itself is believed to mean "shepherds", derived from the Illyrian word delme ("sheep"). The final time this people fought against Rome was in the Illyrian revolt of 6–9 AD. The revolt was started by Dalmatae auxiliary forces and soon spread all over Dalmatia and Pannonia. The resulting war was described by the Roman writer Suetonius as the most difficult faced by Rome since the Punic Wars two centuries earlier. But after the war, the Dalmatae became a loyal and important source of recruits for the Roman army.

== Establishment ==
According to Holder, a total of 12 cohortes Delmatarum appear to have been raised after the suppression of the Illyrian revolt in two series, of 7 and 5 respectively. All these units were in existence by the time of emperor Claudius (r. 41–54) Of these, 9 appear to have survived into the 2nd century.

The regiment was probably raised by founder-emperor Augustus (r. 30 BC-14 AD) after 9 AD. It was certainly in existence by the time of Claudius (r. 41–54). Its early movements are unknown. Holder suggests that the regiment may have taken part in the Roman invasion of Britain (43), but there is no supporting evidence. It first appears in the datable epigraphic record in 105, in Britannia. It was still there in the 3rd century, the time of its last roughly datable inscription, a votive altar at Magnis (Carvoran, Northumbria). The Notitia Dignitatum, a late Roman official document, records a cohors II Delmatarum at Magnis under the dux Britanniarum, the commander of limitanei (border forces) along Hadrian's Wall. The Western section of the Notitia was drawn up in the 420s, but the British units must date to before 410, when the island was evacuated by the Roman army.

== Known commanders ==
The names of two praefecti (regimental commanders) are attested. One, Iulius Maximus is attested as from the city of Rome (135). The other, Marcus Caecilius Donatianus, is attested in the votive altar at Carvoran (3rd century) to a virgo caelestis ("celestial virgin"), probably Tanit, the guardian-goddess of Carthage, implying that Donatianus was perhaps from Africa proconsularis. Also attested is an imaginifer (bearer of the imperial image) (3rd century) and a pedes (common foot soldier) of the Treveri Gallic tribe (135).

== See also ==
- List of Roman auxiliary regiments
