= Cohors I Vangionum Milliaria Equitata =

Cohors Primae Vangionum Milliaria Equitata (First Cohort of Vangiones) was a Roman auxiliary infantry cohort from Upper Germany with both horse and foot soldiers known as a cohors equitata, and nominally 1000 strong (cohors milliaria).

The cohort was stationed at:

- Colchester
- Condercum (Benwell) on Hadrian's Wall
- Chesters on Hadrian's Wall
- Habitancum (Risingham) (from 205 AD)

== See also ==
- Roman auxiliaries
- List of Roman auxiliary regiments
