= Plasau Duon =

Plasau Duon, Caersws
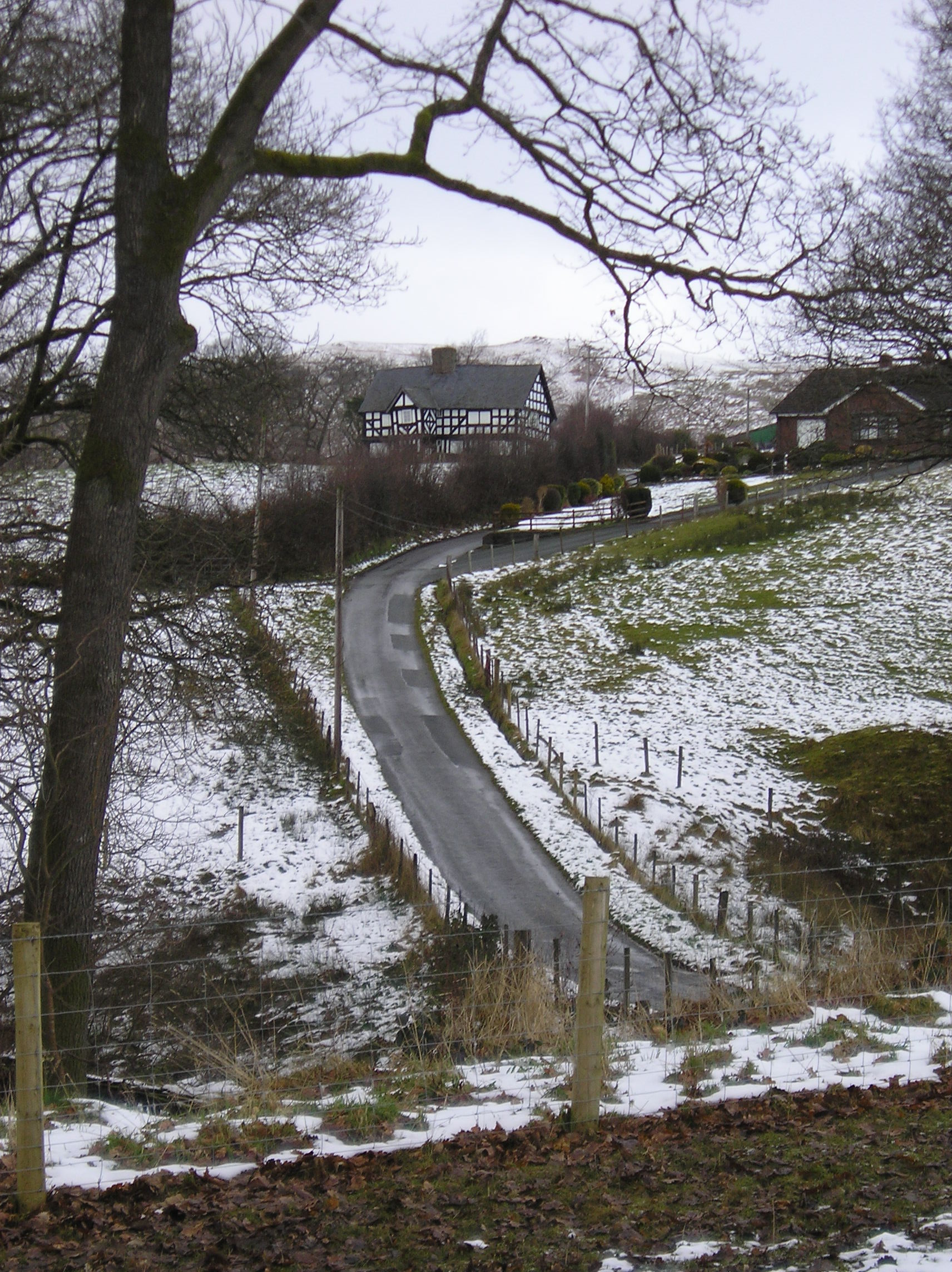
- Plasau Duon, Caersws

- Location in Montgomeryshire
- 52.548044°N 3.472343°W
- Location: Caersws, Montgomeryshire, Wales

History
- Built: Mid-16th Century

Site notes
- Architectural style: Timber framed Severn Valley House

Listed Building – Grade II*
- Designated: 3 October 1953
- Reference no.: 7581

Plasau Duon or Plasauduon is a timber-framed house, formerly in the parish of Carno, but now within the area of the community council of Caersws in the historic county of Montgomeryshire, and now in Powys, Wales. It is located on a site above the left bank of the Afon Carno, on a farm road leading off the lane from the A.470 to Bwlch-y-garreg. It is a fine example of a ‘’Severn Valley’’ house and has a Grade II* listing. It is likely to have been built in the second half of the 16th. century.

== History ==
The Welsh Herald Lewys Dunn recorded in the mid-17th century the ancestors of the Evans family who were living at Plasau Duon. Lewis Evans is known to have been living in 1631 It is likely that it was his grandfather (Howell ap Rhydderch) or great-grandfather (Rhydderch ap Llewelyn) were the builders of the original house. By 1904 Plasau Duon had passed to Miss Mytton, the daughter of the Rev Devereux Mytton of Llandyssil.

== Architecture ==
The house is of the ‘’Severn Valley’’ type, with a storied porch opposite the main back-to-back central fireplace, the hall on the right, and parlour on the left. A rear wing containing the stair, with side lean-to, added later, appears to replace an earlier wing. The Cadw listing considers that the house was built around 1660, but the dating by dendrochronlogy of other similar Montgomeryshire houses with jettied first floors, such Great Cefnyberen and Glas Hirfryn suggest that Plasau Duon could have been built up to a hundred years earlier.

== Interior ==
The hall has a fine ceiling divided into nine square bays with chamfered and label stopped beams and exposed joists. There are dragon beams to the corners supporting the jettied upper floor. There is a large inglenook fireplace with carved arcaded panelling with coat-of arms above. To the left is a carved 17th-century screen which opens to the entrance lobby. Its notable 17th-century floor (beneath modern boards) is of small smooth stones set in earth in geometrical patterns, a technique then widespread in the Trefeglwys and Llanidloes areas There is a similar ceiling in the parlour, divided into six bays, and later wainscott and overmantle. In the extension, at the rear is an oak staircase of box type, with moulded handrail and balusters, and built-in 17th-century cupboards.

=== Outside ===
The building is two storied with an attic and slate roof. Plain stone chimney of untypical form. The timber-framed construction has close studding to the ground floor, and square timber-framing. The upper storey of the porch has bold diamond framing which is similar to Glas Hirfryn and Rhydycarw in Trefeglwys. The porch is off-centre because the hall is twice as wide as the parlour. The porch has depressed ogee inner and outer doorheads. There are turned balusters set into the sides of the porch and internal side seats. The older part of the house is jettied on three sides with ovolo and hollow moulded bressumers, and supported by brackets.

== Literature ==
- Davies A,(1903–4) 'The History of the Parish of Carno' Montgomeryshire Collections XXXIII., pp 169–170
- Smith P and Owen CEV, 'Traditional and Renaissance Elements in some late Stuart and early Georgian Half-Timbered Houses in Arwystli' Montgomeryshire Collections LV–LVI. 1957–60, pp 101–124. Plan at Fig. 4 and photographs before restoration at Plate II;
- Royal Commission on the Ancient and Historical Monuments of Wales, (1911), Inventory of the Ancient Monuments in Wales and Monmouth I – County of Montgomery.
- Scourfield R. and Haslam R. (2013), The Buildings of Wales: Powys; Montgomeryshire, Radnorshire and Breconshire, Yale University Press. pp101.
- Smith P.(1988, 2nd ed.), Houses of the Welsh Countryside, H.M.S.O., pp 94–5, and maps 10, 19, 30, 33 and 39.
- Suggett R and Stevenson G. (2010), Introducing Houses of the Welsh Countryside. Cyflwyno Cartrefi Cefn Gwlad Cymru. Y Lolfa/ RCAHMW.

== See also: the following Montgomeryshire Timber-framed houses ==
- Great Cefnyberen
- Ty Mawr, Castle Caereinion
- Cilthriew, Kerry (Montgomeryshire)
- Maesmawr Hall, Llandinam
- Glas Hirfryn, Llansilin
- Lymore, (Montgomery)
