= Owain Glyndŵr's Parliament House =

Building in Machynlleth, Powys, Wales

The Parliament House and Glyndŵr Institute, Machynlleth
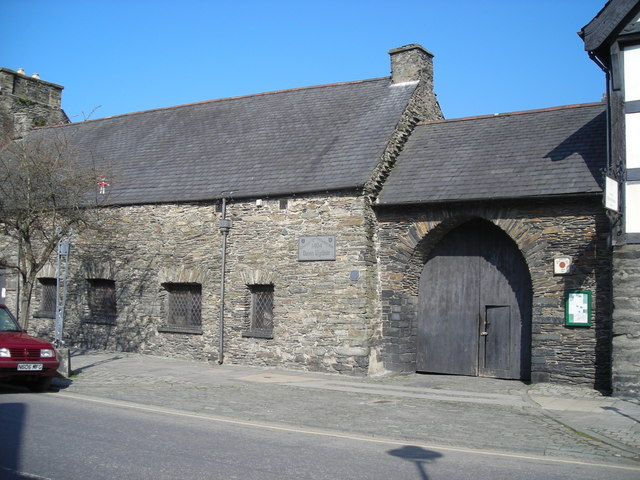
- Royal House, Machynlleth 1559–61

- Location in Powys
- 52.5906°N 3.8482°W
- Location: Machynlleth, Powys, Wales

History
- Built: 1559–61

Site notes
- Architectural styles: Timber Roof and Stone

Listed Building – Grade II
- Official name: Owain Glyndŵr's Parliament House
- Criteria: Listed Grade II because of the great importance to Welsh history.
- Designated: 19 November 1990
- Reference no.: 8429
- 7

Owain Glyndŵr's Parliament House (Welsh: Senedd-dy Owain Glyndŵr) was traditionally the building where Owain Glyndŵr held a parliament in 1404. However, the origin of the building is probably later. The existing building may be 15th century in origin, but has been extensively rebuilt, particularly by David Davies of Llandinam, who purchased it in 1906. It was opened on 20 February 1912 to provide a social centre for the town. The present rubble exterior is an interpretation of its 15th-century appearance, probably by the architect Frank Shayler, who may also have designed the adjacent Glyndŵr Institute.

== Location ==
The Parliament House is in the centre of the town and is set into a continuous row of frontages midway along Heol Maengwyn, opposite the entrance to Plas Machynlleth and to the left of the Owain Glyndwr Institute.

== History ==
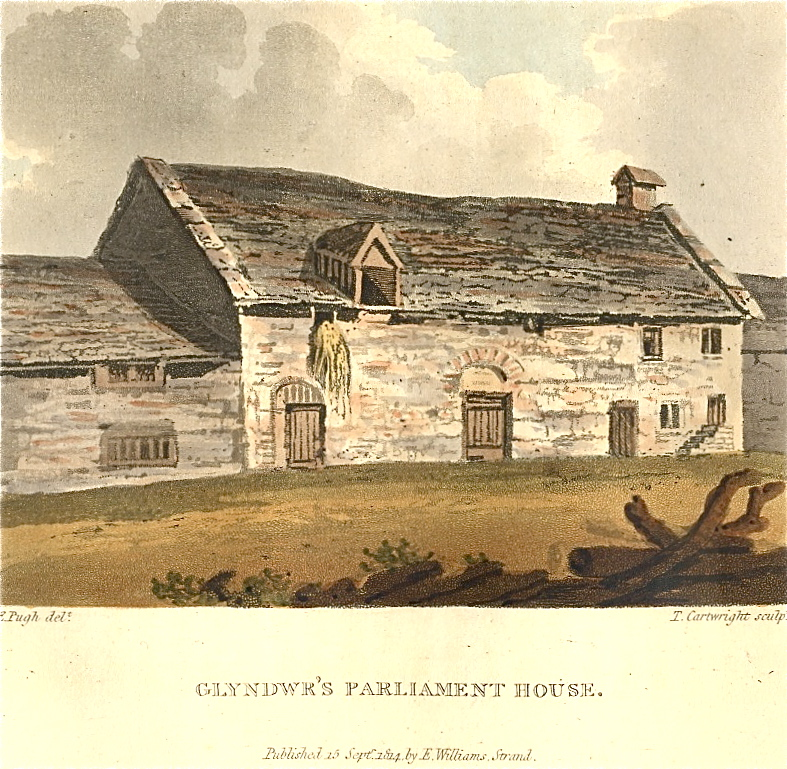
Parliament House, Machynlleth

In about 1813, artist Edward Pugh visited Machynlleth, and in 1816, he published a fine coloured lithograph of Parliament House. He provides the following description of the building:

Owen Glyndwr held his parliament here: and the house is still in being in which he and his adherents assembled. Its exterior appearance is barn like, and it is now used as a granary, etc, with the exception of one end, which is occupied as a miserable dwelling-house. Its interior exhibits great age: at the back is a flight of stone stairs in ruins, leading into the great room, in which there are carved ribs etc, in timber.

== Architecture of the Parliament House ==
The Parliament House, Machynlleth, is a substantial and remarkably complete hall-house sited parallel to the main road which approaches the town from the east. The hall-house has a four-unit plan: a storeyed outer room of two bays, an open passage (2 bays between partition trusses), an open hall (3 bays with dais-end partition), and a storeyed inner-room of two bays. The carpentry is refined: purlins and ridge are tenoned into the trusses. The principal rafters of each truss are unusually shaped ('extruded') to receive the tenoned collar. In the hall the purlins are moulded with two tiers of windbraces (replaced), and the trusses have shaped feet. The upper-end truss is set forward from the dais partition to form a shallow canopy. The site is traditionally associated with Owain Glyndŵr's Parliaments of 1402 and 1404 and was restored and extended in 1911 as a library and institute commemorating Glyndŵr. Tree-ring dating from timber in the building shows that it was felled in 1470, which is two generations later than the parliaments, but the origins of this substantial and important house may be considerably older. The interior is now an exhibition centre.

=== Frieze by Murray Urquhart ===
One of the most important features of the Parliament House is a mural by Scottish artist Murray McNeel Caird Urquhart (1880–1972), showing scenes from the life of Owain Glyndŵr. It comprises a series of 4 large panels depicting scenes from his life, in particular the Battle of Hyddgen, fought on the slopes of nearby Pumlumon in June 1401. The mural was painted by Urquhart between 1912 and 1914. Urquhart trained in Edinburgh, London, and Paris.

== The Glyndŵr Institute ==
The Glyndŵr Institute is located next to Parliament House at Nos. 80–88 Heol Maengwyn. It dates to 1911 and was built for Lord Davies of Llandinam, who bought two cottages on the site in 1909. It was probably designed by architect Frank Shayler, who undertook other similar work for Lord Davies. The design is that of an L-plan black-and-white Tudor Revival building with a slate roof and stone chimney stacks. The left elevation of the building features a bay front with a broad-bracketed gable, and diamond-leaded glazed windows with mullions and transoms. A two-storey porch in the centre features a similar gable design with overhanging eaves and a garlanded rainwater head. A cross-framed oriel window and pediment adorn the segmental-arched entrance with a boarded and studded door. The right elevation of the building features a three-storey tower with a pyramidal roof and tall weathervane. There is a pointed arch doorway to the tower, which features a dog-leg staircase and a partially carved stone handrail inside. Other interior features include some half-timbered walls and a stone fireplace with half-round columns.

The building was listed Cadw Grade II in November 1990. Today it serves as a civic building and tourist office.

== See also ==
- Buildings associated with Owain Glyndŵr
- Senedd building, headquarters of the devolved Senedd, Cardiff

Early Buildings in Montgomeryshire:

- Ty Mawr, Castle Caereinion
- Penarth (Newtown and Llanllwchaiarn)
- Maesmawr Hall, Llandinam
- Glas Hirfryn, Llansilin

== Literature ==
- Scourfield R. and Haslam R. (2013), The Buildings of Wales: Powys; Montgomeryshire, Radnorshire and Breconshire, Yale University Press.
