= Cilthriew, Kerry (Montgomeryshire) =

Cilthrew, Kerry, Powys
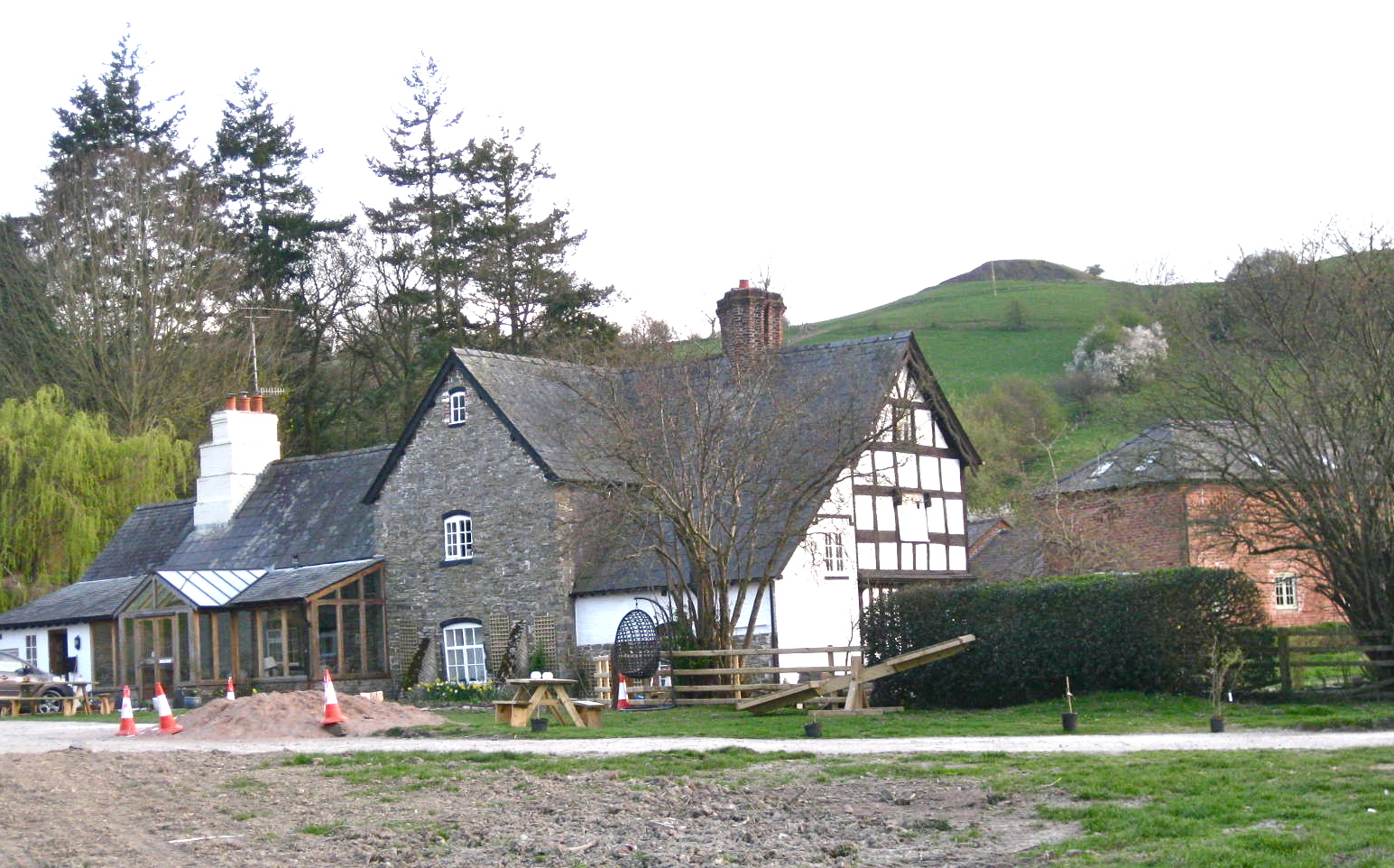
- Cilthrew, Kerry, (Montgomeryshire)

- Location in Powys

General information
- Location: Powys, Wales, UK
- Coordinates: 52.489732°N 3.241541°W
- OS grid: SO3157828871

Cilthrew is a Grade II listed house and former farm in Kerry, Powys, in the historic county of Montgomeryshire, now Powys. Cilthrew was used by the Papworth Trust which provided a range of high quality services for disabled and disadvantaged people. Cilthrew provided free short breaks for disabled people and their families in a farm surrounding.

== History ==
In the Middle Ages Cilthrew was one of the townships in Kerry. The township is also referred to as Kilroith or Kilroyth. Richard Williams makes the claim that Cilthriew and the neighbouring house of Brynllywarch (which was also a township) were in the ownership of the Pugh (ap Hugh) family from at least 1500. A William Pugh of Kilroith is mentioned in 1632, when he purchased from Ann Foxe, widow of Somerset Foxe lands in Kilroith including Maes y Deynant William Pugh of ‘‘Kilthrew’’ was the Sheriff of Montgomeryshire in 1767 and his son William, who was also Sheriff of Montgomeryshire in 1813, became a very successful attorney and purchased the Caer Howell estate in Montgomery. His son was the notable William Pugh, an entrepreneur, who did much to develop trade and infrastructure in the Montgomeryshire Severn valley. He paid for the final extension of the Montgomery Canal from Berriew to Newtown, and for various road building schemes including a road from Abermule along the Mule valley. In Newtown he encouraged the growth of the textile industry and was responsible for the Flannel exchange, designed by Thomas Penson. In 1828 he sold the Caer Howell estate, using the proceeds to develop Brynllywarch. For this work he may have employed T G Newnham and J W Poundley as his architects and surveyors. His schemes were over ambitious and in June 1835 he fled to Caen in Normandy to escape his creditors. This resulted in the Brynllywarch and Cilthriew estates, which then consisted of 27 farms, being sold in 1839 to Richard Leyland (Bullin), a very wealthy banker from Liverpool. Leyland was to give these estates, together with the Leighton Hall Estates to his nephew John Naylor in 1846. The very detailed survey of the estates purchased by Leyland and later John Naylor, drawn up by J W Poundley, is now in the National Library of Wales. John Naylor died on13th July 1889 and the estates continued in the Naylor family ownership until about 1930, when the various farms including Cilthrew were sold.

== Architectural description ==
Originally a ‘‘sub-medieval’’ timber-framed house of Peter Smith’s ‘‘Lobby Entrance Houses’’ dating to the later years of the 16th century. The house is orientated NW-SE on a flat recessed area before a rising hill (as the Welsh name Cil-Rhiew would appear to suggest). A porch on the NW side suggests that this was a standard ‘‘lobby-entrance’’ house and there is a large rectangular stone chimney stack which is placed directly in front of the entrance, originally forming a lobby.

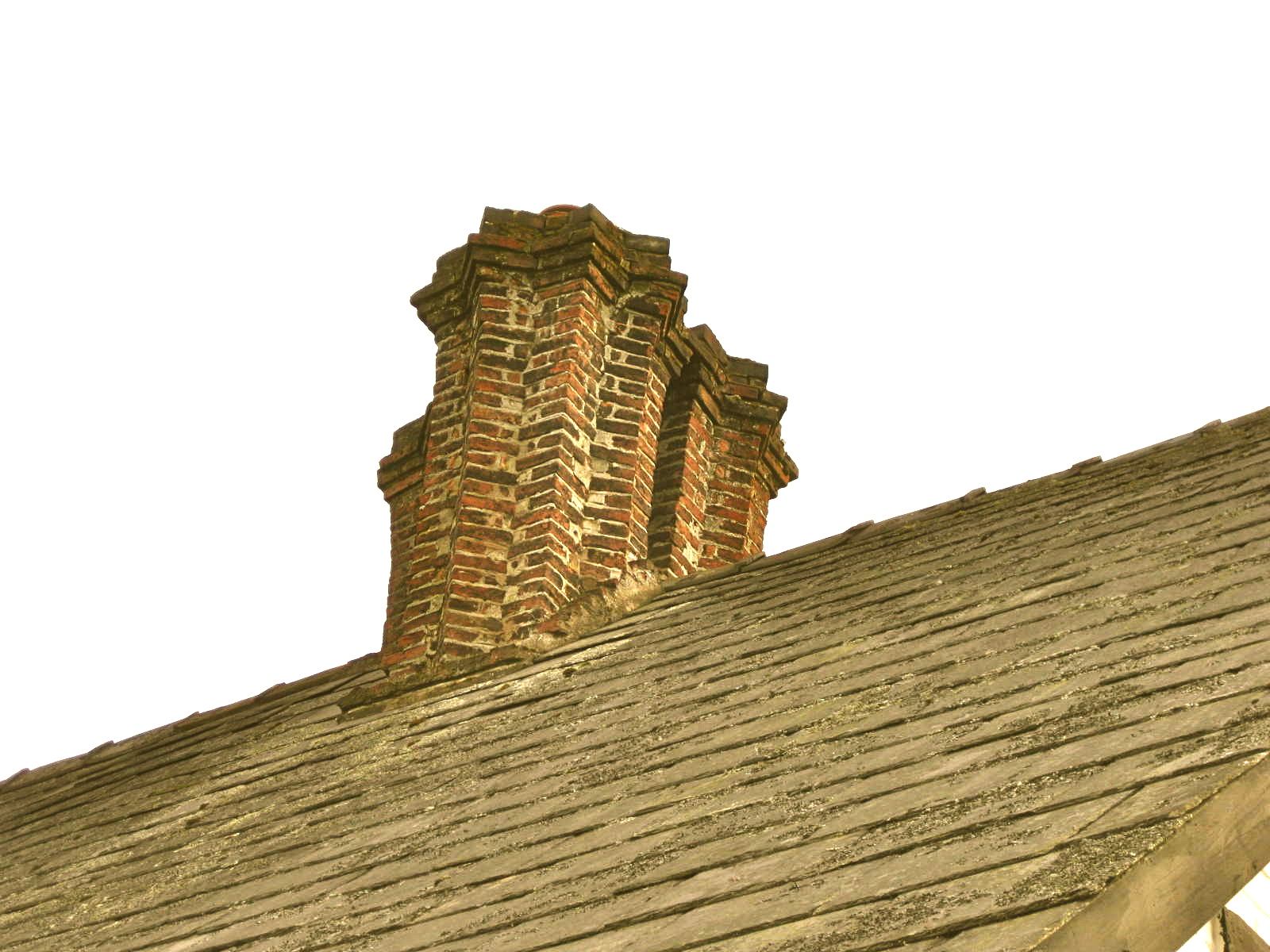
Stellar chimney stack, Cilthriew.

The chimney stack, consisting of three brick chimneys of stellar form, is a fine example of type that occurs in the last two or three decades of the 16th century in this area. Peter Smith in Houses of the Welsh Countryside has mapped the occurrence of these chimney stacks (including Cilthriew), which are distributed mainly in North West Wales, along the border with England.

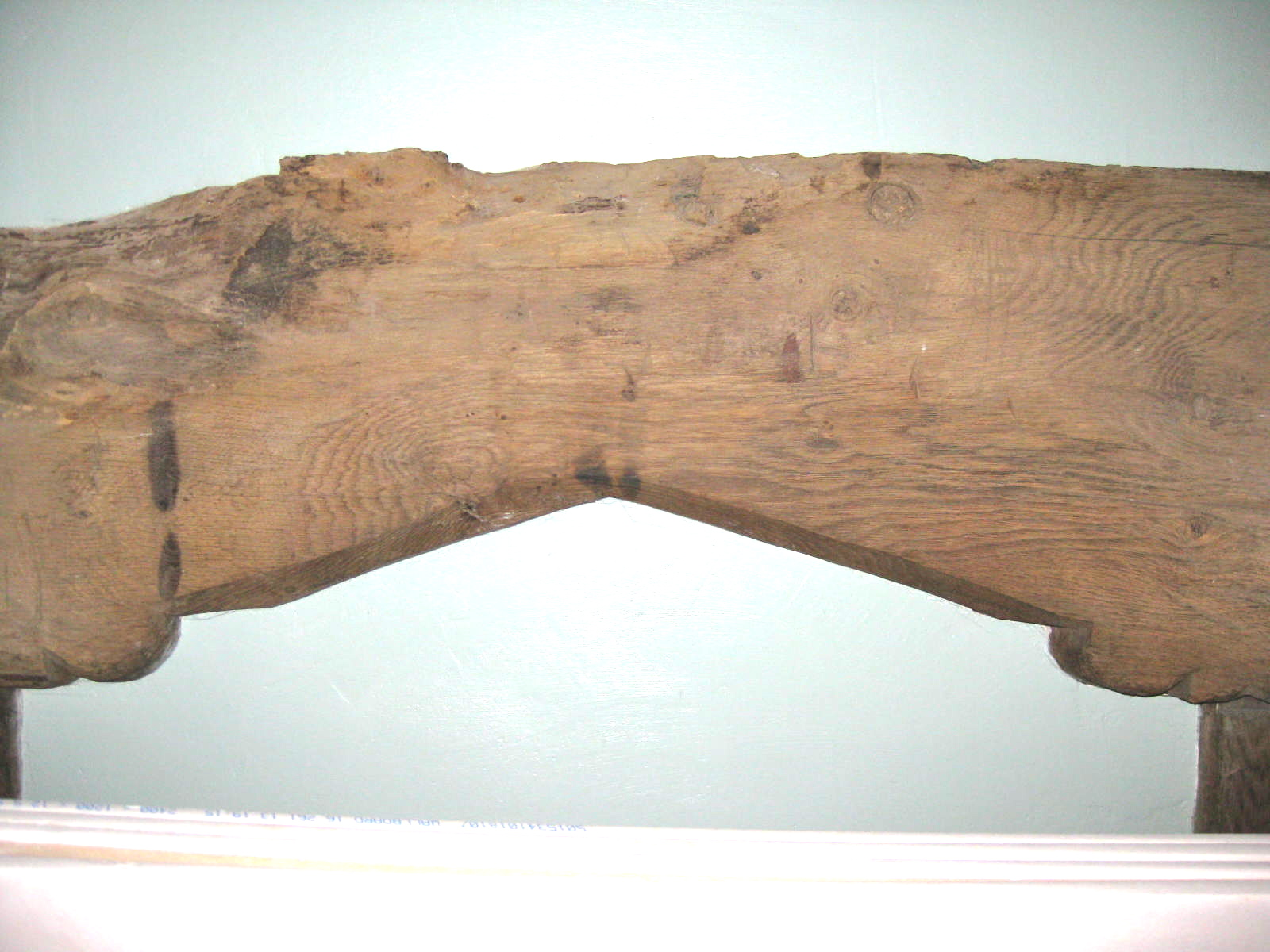
‘‘Ornate’’ door opening cut into wall-plate. Cilthriew, Kerry.

The existence of an ornate doorhead cut into a wall plate at 1st floor level, may represent an early alteration to the house.

Major alterations were made in the late 18th century or more probably in the 1840s, when Cilthriew was acquired by the Brynllywarch Estates. The house was transected by two stone wings (at right angles and aligned NE-SW) which override the earlier timber-framed structure. The timber-framed structure survives within the stone wings, but it was then chopped off to the off to the SW. When the house was altered it was re-roofed with very fine massive tun slates above the eaves and with graduated slates up to the ridge. This is a very rare survival of a technique common in the 18th century, but in this case it may later. At the N E in the angle between the timber framed house and the stone wing is a slightly sunken room, described as a ‘’cellar’’, but almost certainly a dairy, as it would have been ideal for cooling milk.

Brick ranges have been added to the SW with a doorway and a dormer with two arched windows above. This has been done in a ‘‘Tudoresque ‘’ or Jacobethan style and must be contemporary with the carved bargeboards on the gables and shaped brackets on either side of an upper chamber window on the timber framed section. These additions give Cilthriew a Cottage orné appearance suggesting that it is the work of an estate architecture, working for the Naylors, most probably John Wilkes Poundley, who published "Poundley’s Cottage Architecture" in 1857.

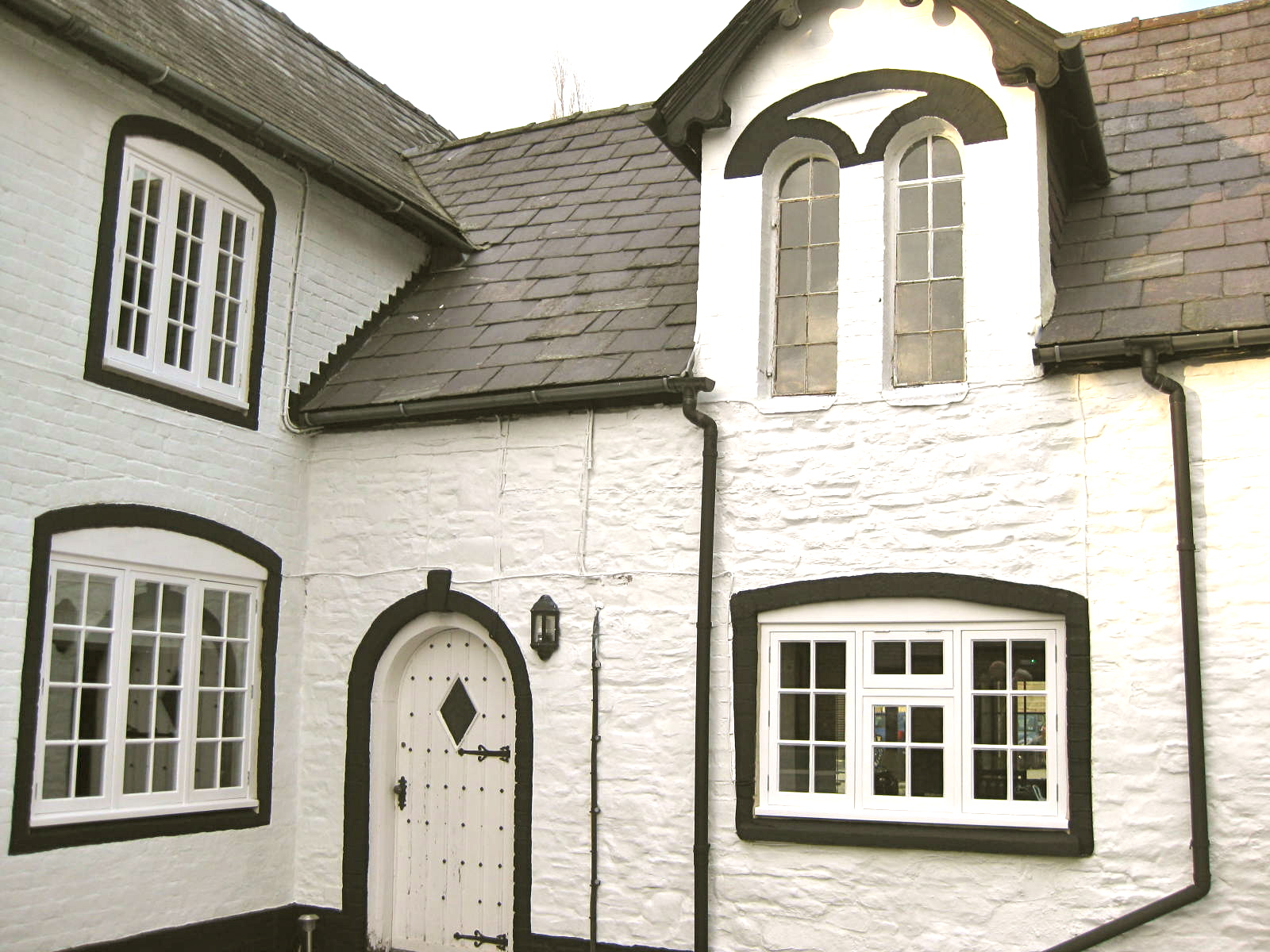
Victorian brick extension with arched dormer windows and arched doorway

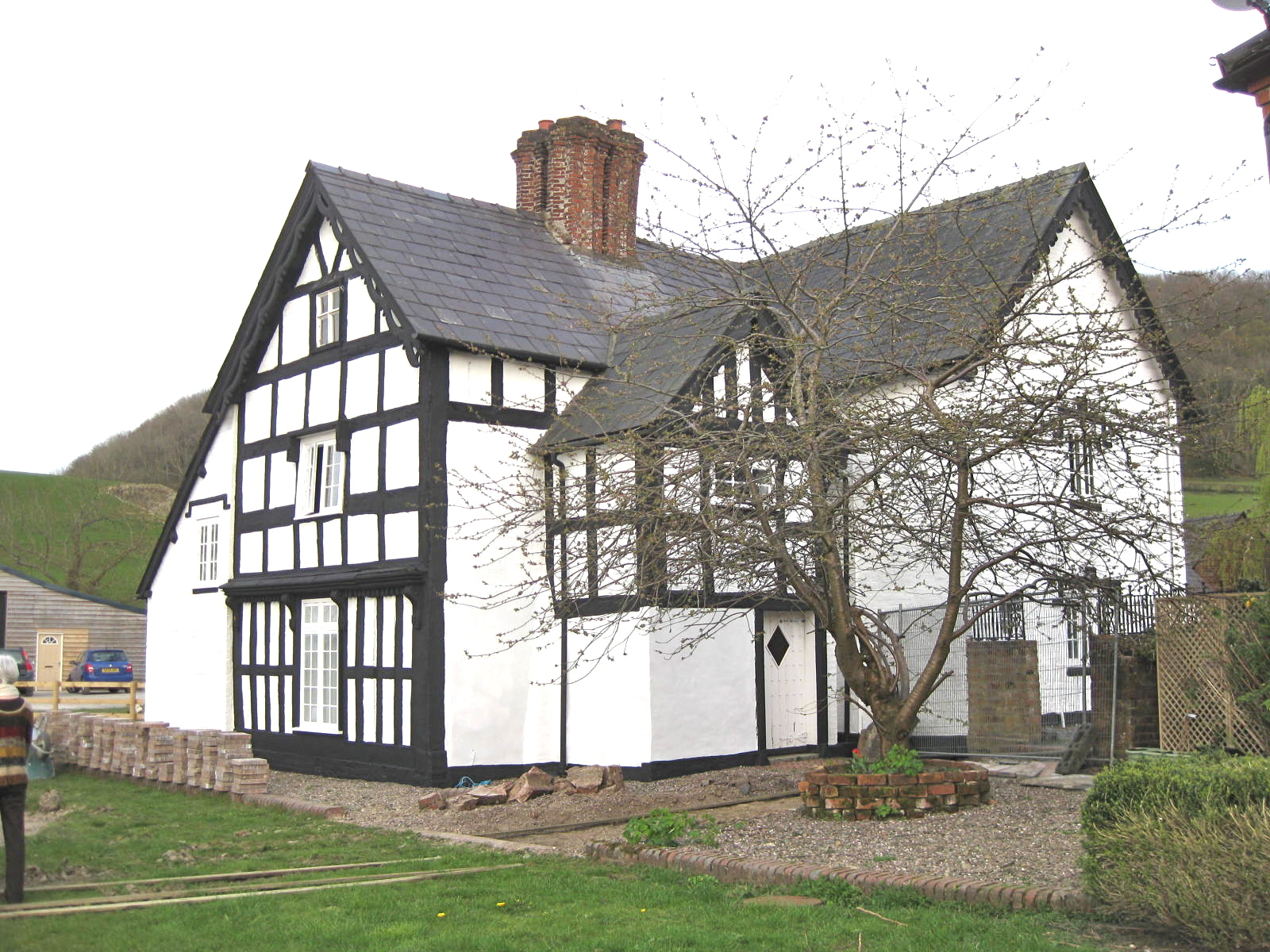
The older timber-framed house on the NW side

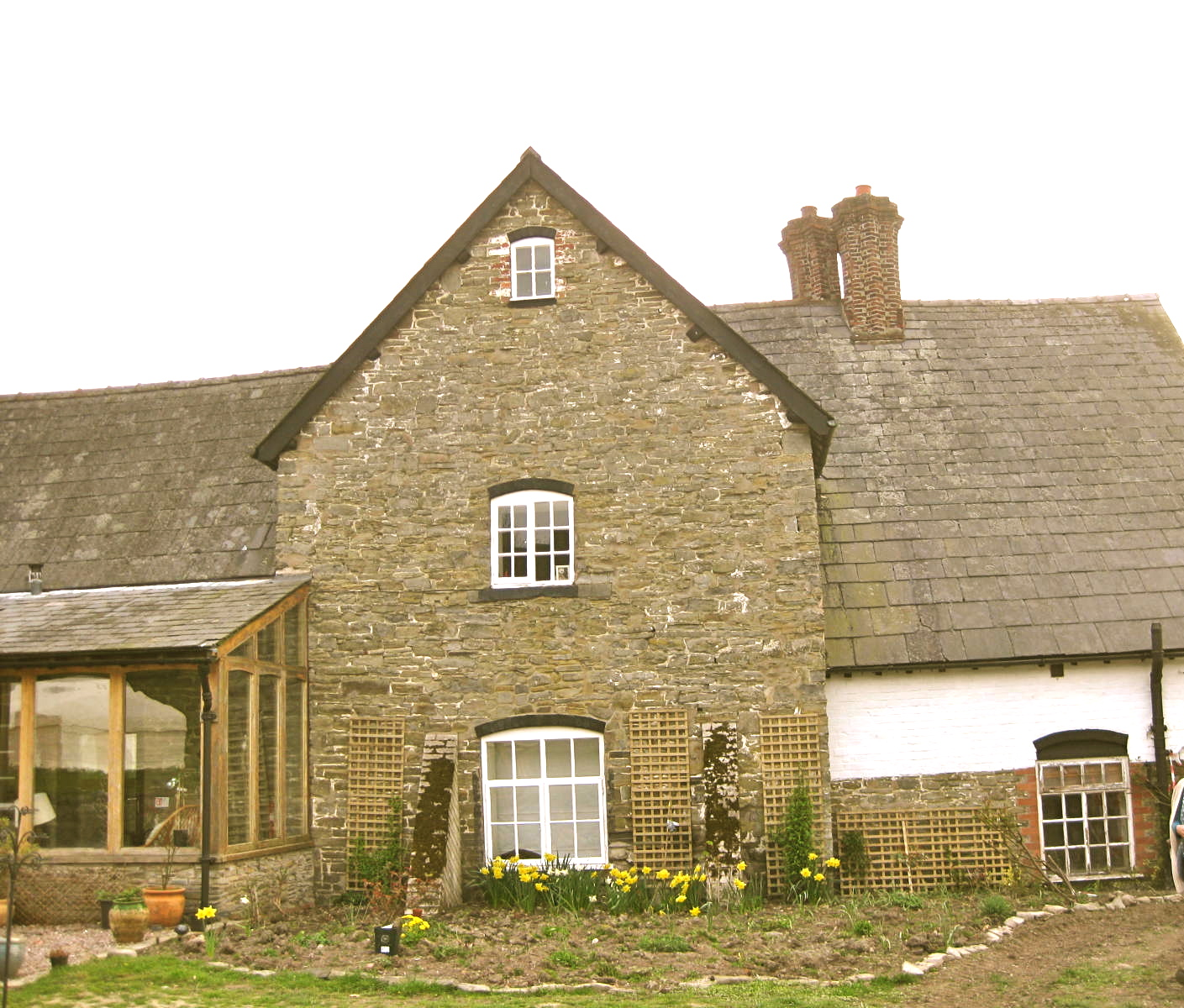
Stone wing with “tun” slates and stellar chimney

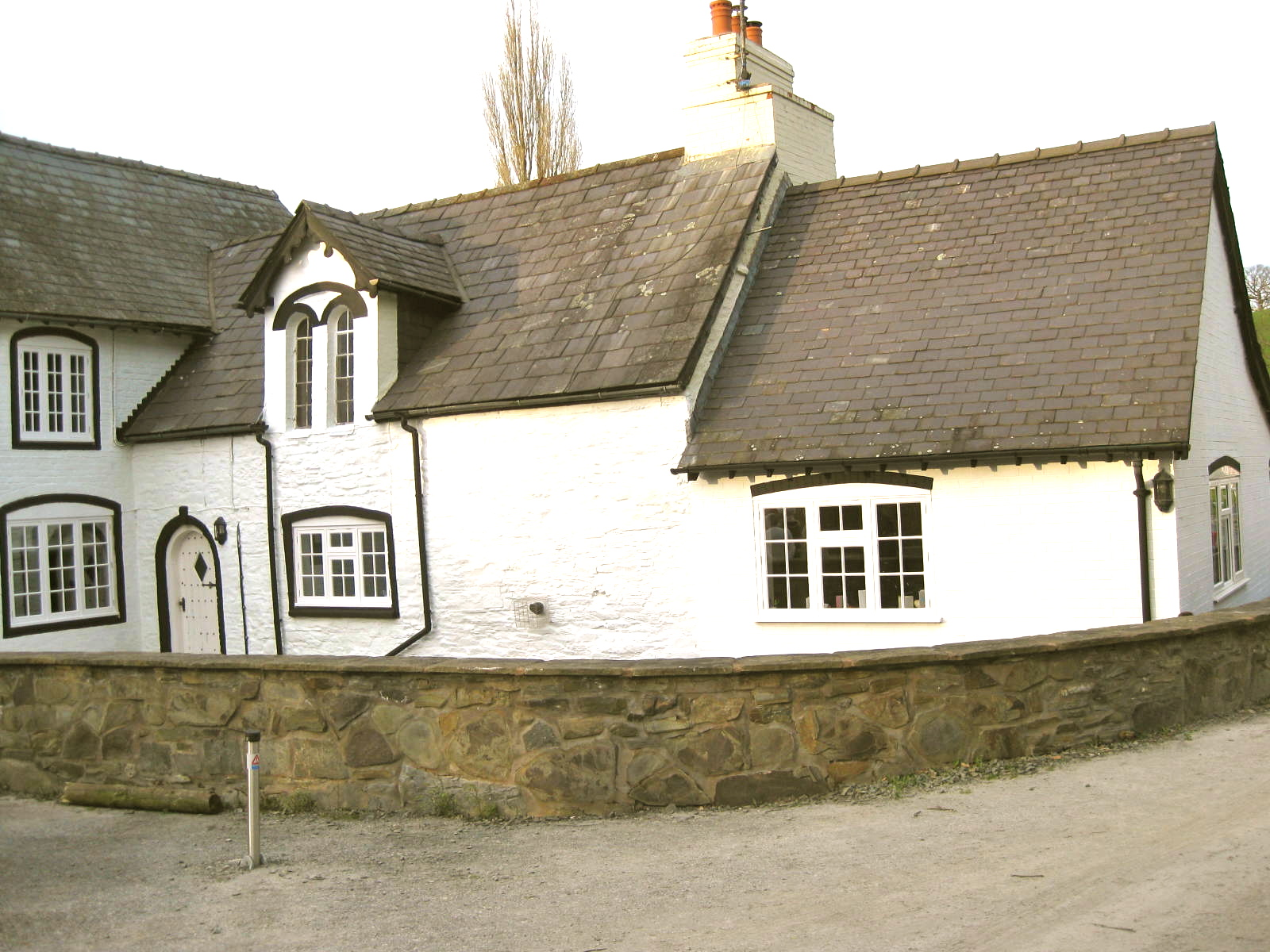
Brick extension with dormer to SW

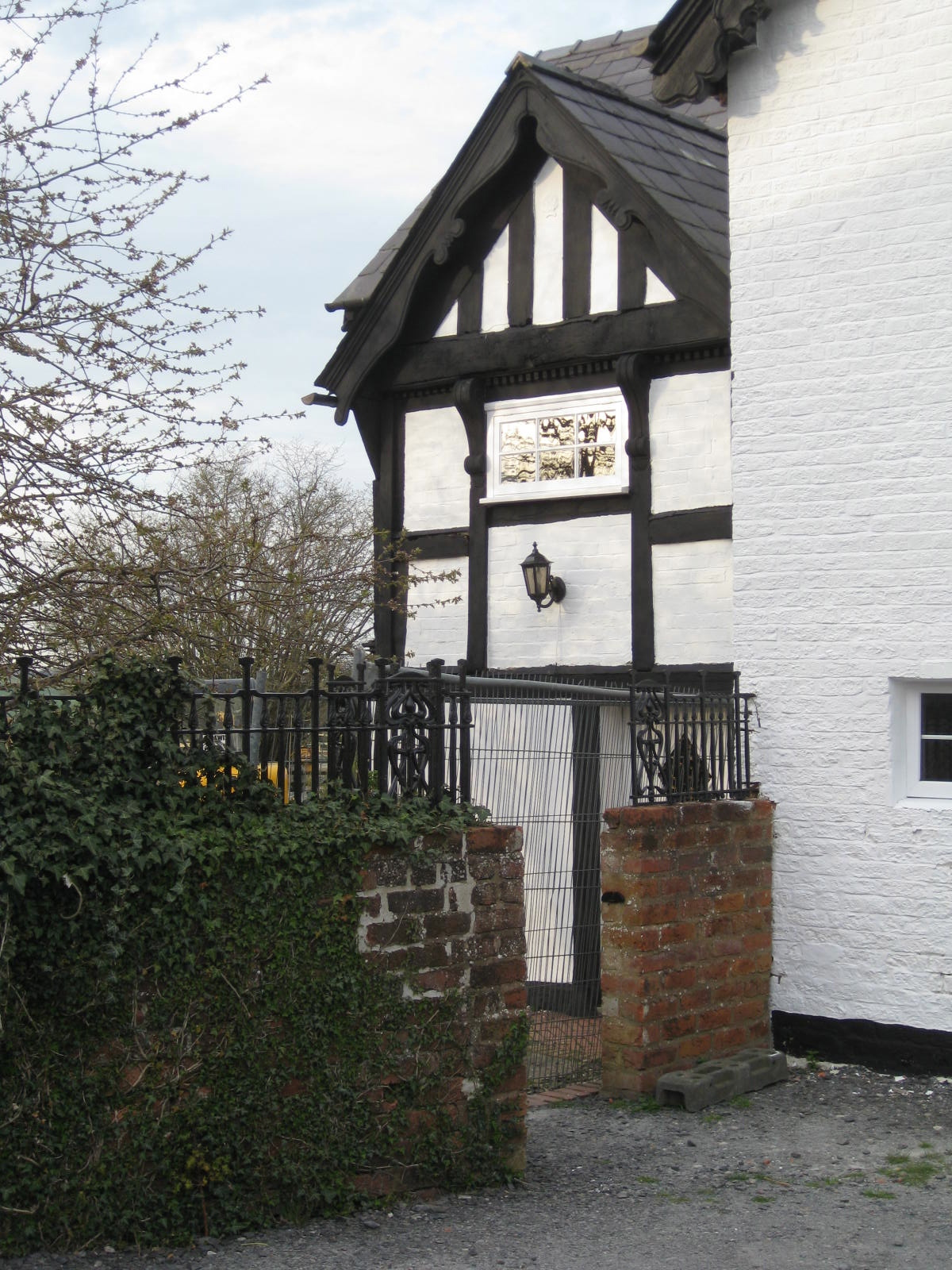
Porch to “Lobby entrance

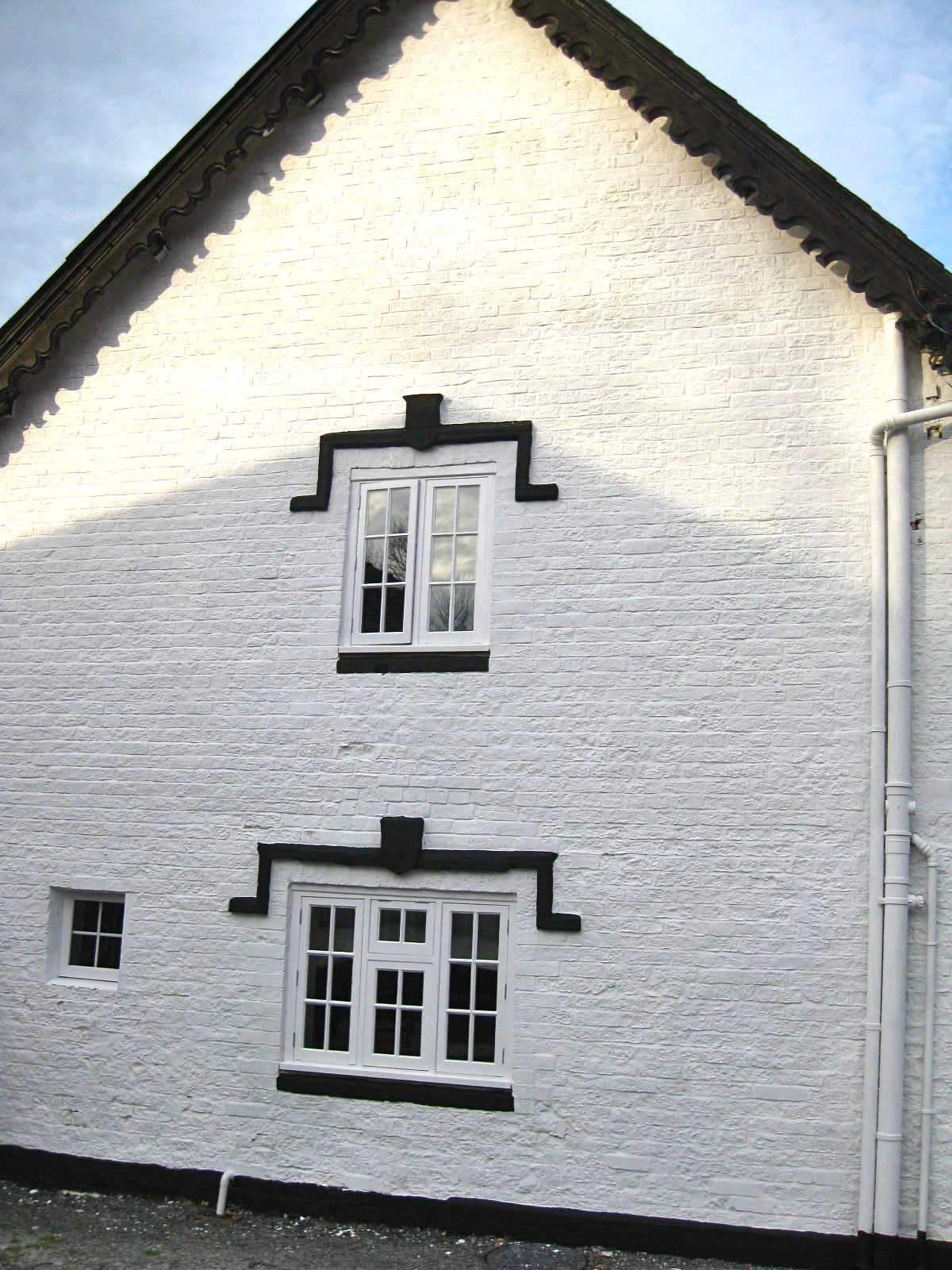
End brick gable of stone wing with Tudoresque window detailing

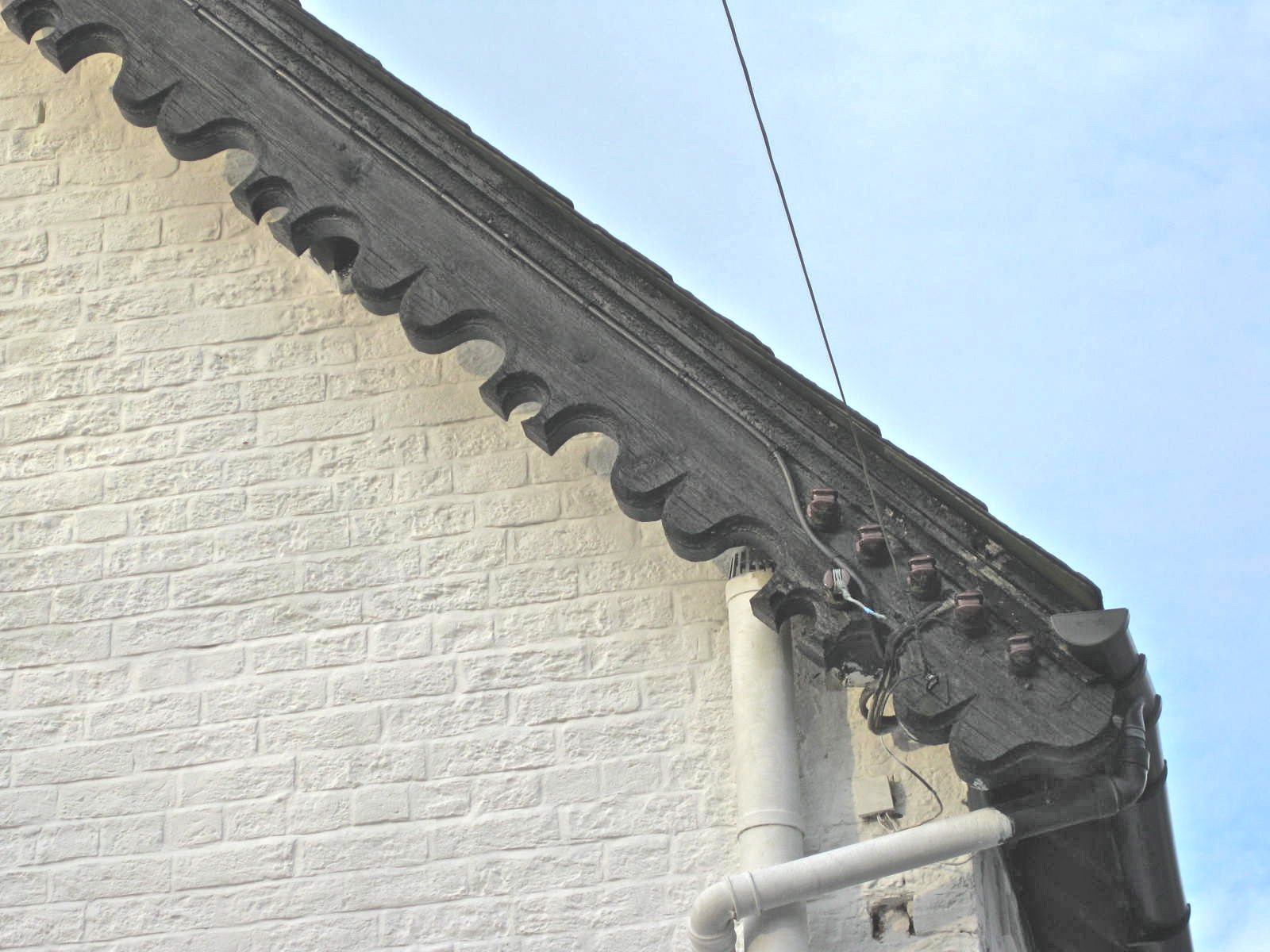
Victorian bargeboard detail

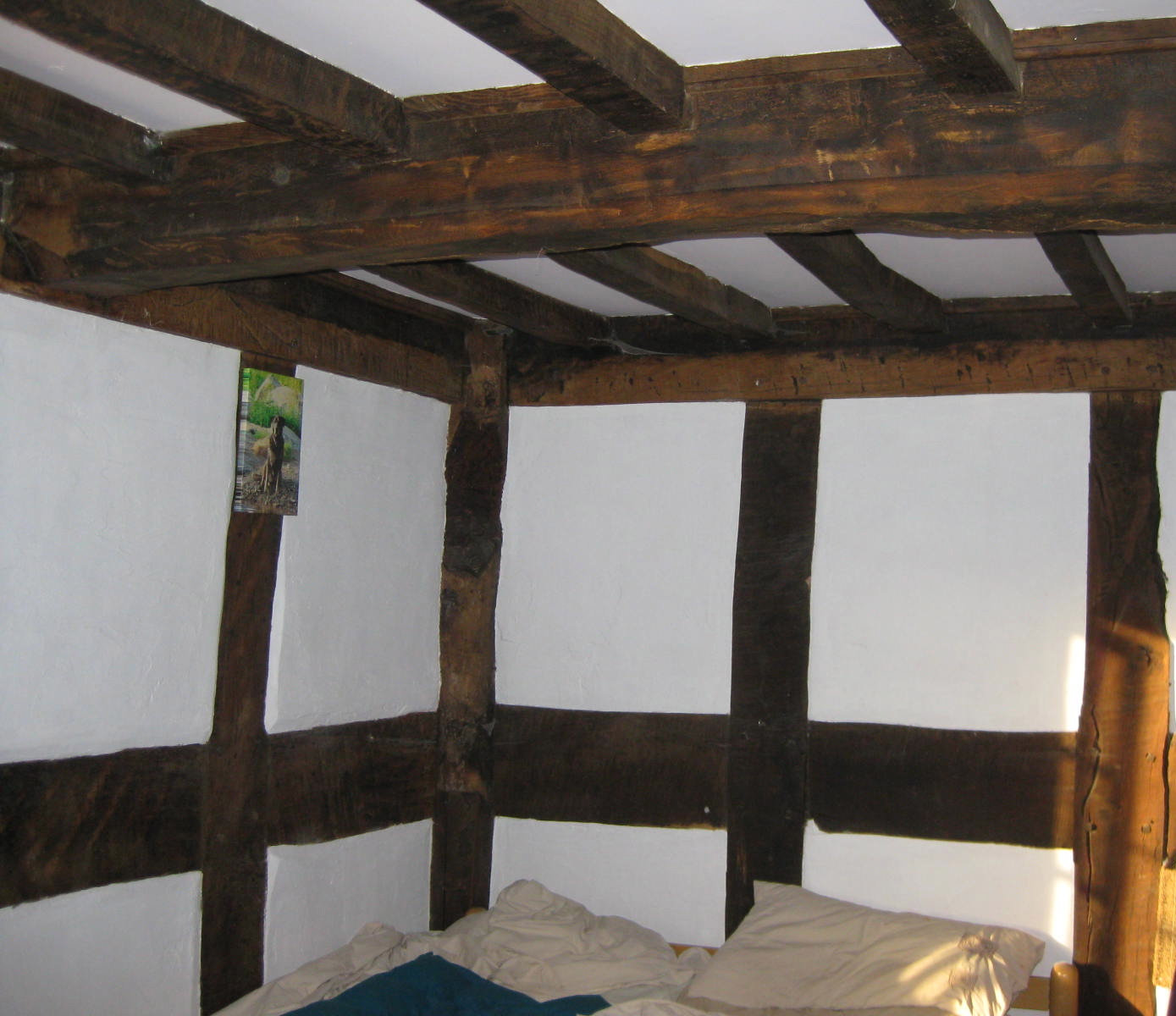
Interior timber framing

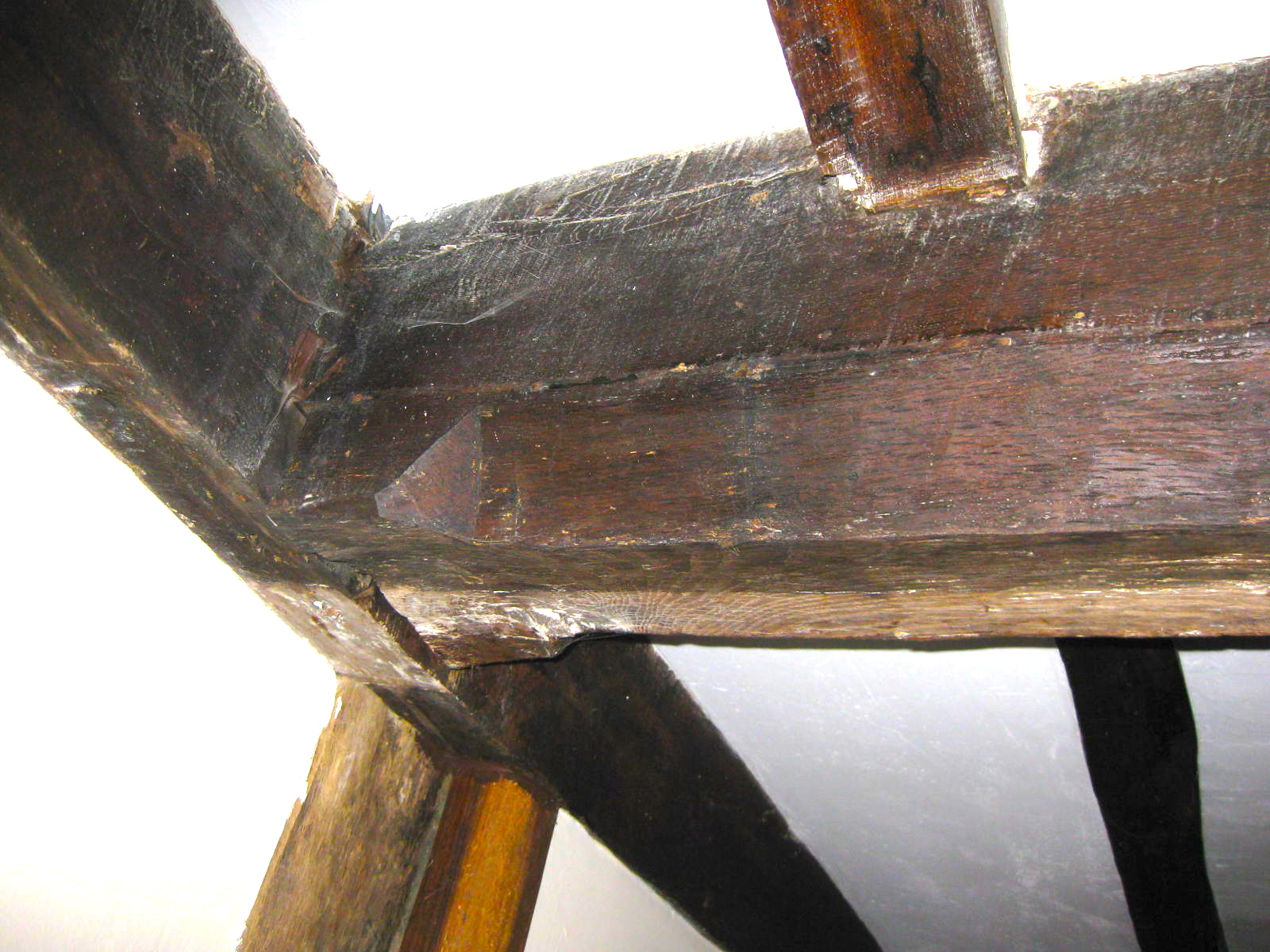
Beam with label stop

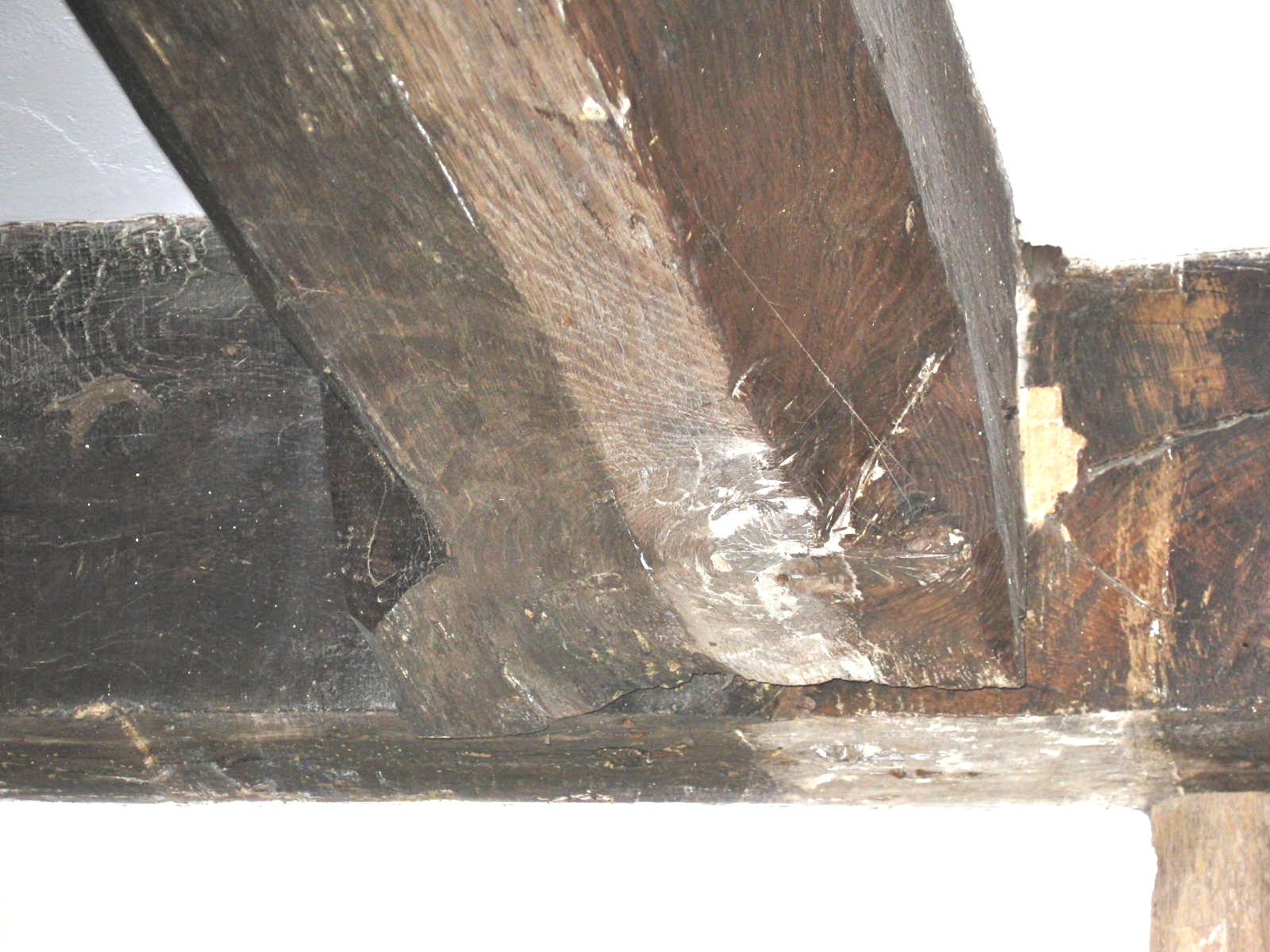
Beam with label stop

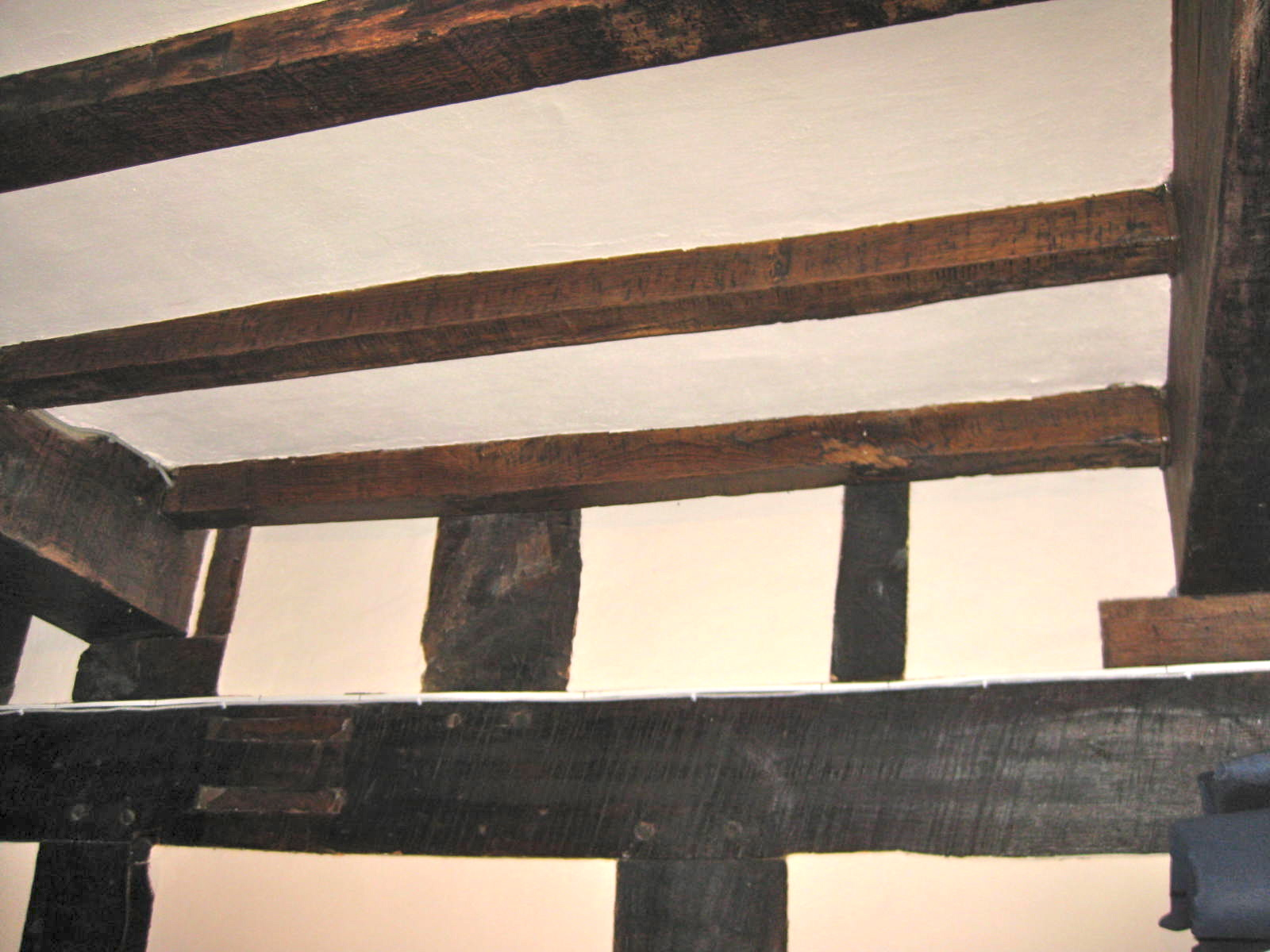
Raised floor level

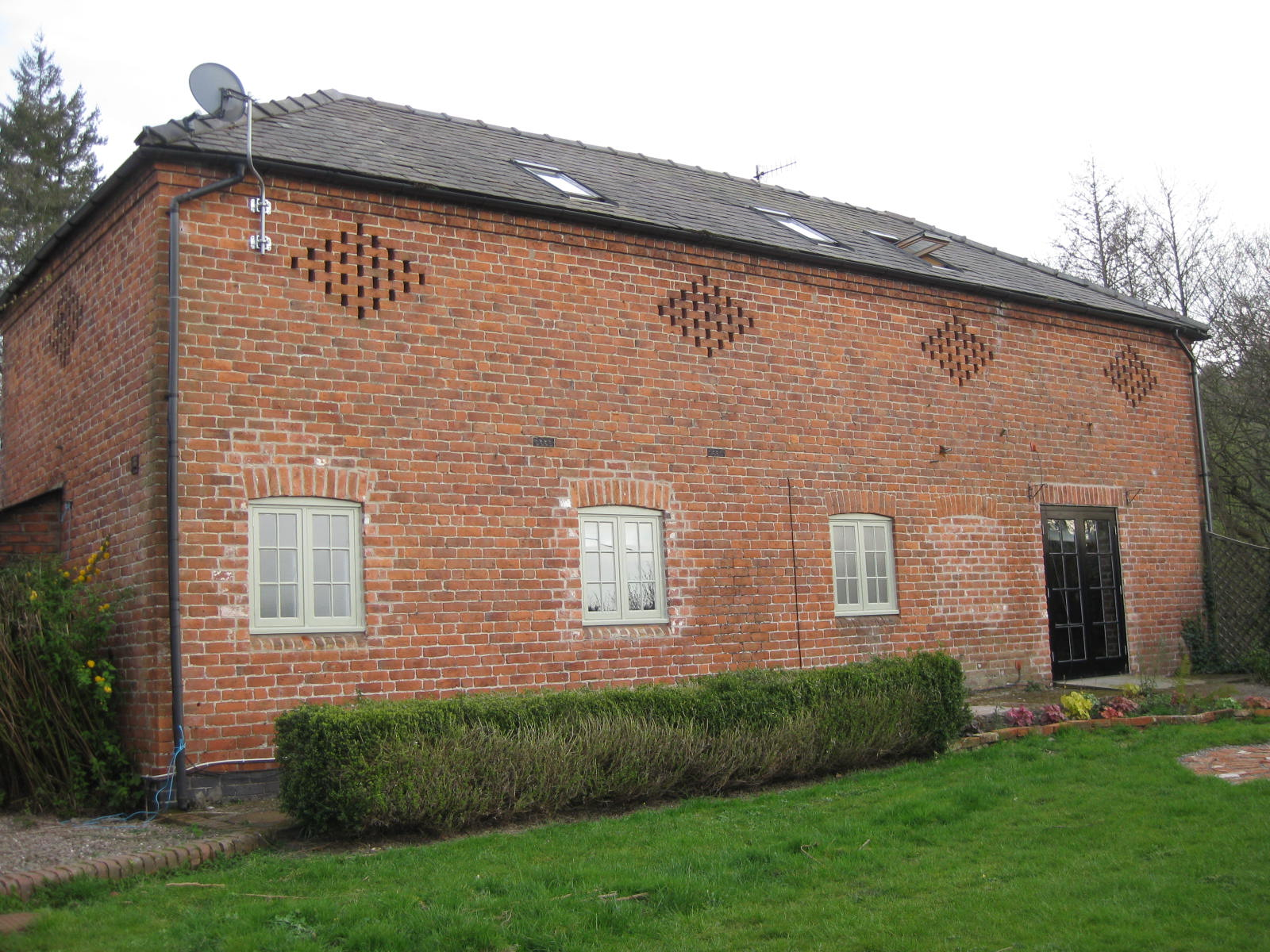
Converted barn

== See also ==
- Great Cefnyberen – timber-framed house in Montgomeryshire
- Ty Mawr, Castle Caereinion – timber-framed house in Montgomeryshire
- Penarth (Newtown and Llanllwchaiarn) – timber-framed house in Montgomeryshire
- Glas Hirfryn, Llansilin – timber-framed house in Montgomeryshire
- Upper Pengelli, Kerry Farm designed by Poundley and Walker.
- Lymore, (Montgomery) – timber-framed house in Montgomeryshire
