= Great Cefnyberen =

- Cefnyberen Fawr
- Location in Powys

General information
- Location: Powys, Wales, UK
- Coordinates: 52.51°N 3.174°W
- OS grid: SO204908

Great Cefnyberen (Welsh: Cefnyberen Fawr) is a Grade II timber-framed house in the township of Cefnyberen in the historic parish of Kerry, Montgomeryshire. A date stone on the gable of the projecting wing indicates that the south frontage of the house was refaced in stone in 1743.

== Architectural description ==
A T-plan house of high status, tree-ring dated to between 1545 and 1566. Medieval hall. The studding to the whole, infilled with oak panels, is largely hidden by render, the fenestration all later. On the north side – the original front – the massive wall-plate is supported by brackets springing from pilasters carved on the studs. The main range has a lobby-entry layout, with a star-pattern chimney. Inside, there's some nice 16th-century detail, notably a roll-moulded beam in the outer chamber. Evidence of the dais seat in the hall. The wing contains the inner parlour, ovolo-moulded beams; and a 17th-century stair behind.

== History of the house ==
=== After the dissolution of Abbey Cwm Hir ===
The township of Cefnyberen was part of the Monastic Grange of Gwernago in Kerry that was owned by the Cistercian Abbey of Cwm Hir in Radnorshire. Until the Abbey was dissolved in 1536–7, it seems that the township formed part of a forested area stretching northwards to Cefn y Coed in Llandyssil. At the time of the Dissolution of the Monasteries, the lands of Gwernago were purchased by Sir John Williams, Baron Williams of Thame, who fought with Henry Tudor at Bosworth. He was an immensely rich and important person, dying at Ludlow Castle on 14 October 1559, when he was Lord President of the Marches. He was Keeper of the Jewels to Henry VIII and was a close associate of Thomas Cromwell in the dissolution of the Monasteries and the sequestration of their property, becoming Treasurer of the Court of Augmentations. His purchase of Abbey Cwm Hir from the Court of Augmentations is recorded on 4 May 1545-6 This purchase included the Grange of Gwernago, and there is a long description of “Coed Kyrye ap heren”, which is almost certainly the forest of Cefnyberen. This gives a fairly exact acreage describing the various trees, and the part of the area was regarded as common land. Two valuations are given: £7 15s 10d for the forest and £8 15s 8p for the other land. When Baron Williams died in 1559 his will instructed that the Gwernago should be sold to pay off debts. Cefnyberen is not included in the sale, and it appears to have been sold earlier to a John ap R(ees), who was paying in 1534–35 a rent of £8 8s, and who may have been the abbot's bailiff at Gwernago.

=== John ap Rees and the Pryce Family ===
A significant amount of information is available about John ap Rees and his descendants, who later adopted the surname Pryce. He came originally from Ednop in Shropshire, in Mainstone parish, near Clun, which at that time would have been a Welsh-speaking area. John ap Rees must be considered the most likely builder of Great Cefnyberen, as his dates most closely match the dendrochronological dates of 1545–1566 for the building of the house. He was married to an Elen, daughter of Griffith ap Iean Lloyd. He died in 1579, and his will and detailed probate inventory of his possessions in the house are now in the National Library of Wales- Great Cefnyberen then passed to their son Maurice. When he died in 1588, he devised the mansion house in which he lived, situated in Keven y beren .... to his wife Jane. He left beds to his daughters and property and money to five sons, and the residue of his lands to his eldest son, Stephen. The will is printed in full in the Montgomeryshire Collections His son was Stephen, who had a son, Hugh, who died in 1632, whose will is also in the National Library of Wales. His son Morris Pryce was declared an “outlaw’ in 1672, probably because of his Puritan beliefs. Great Cefyberen continued in the ownership of descendants of the Pryce family until the early years of the 19th century.

== See also ==
Timber-framed houses in Montgomeryshire

- Cilthriew, Kerry (Montgomeryshire)
- Ty Mawr, Castle Caereinion
- Penarth (Newtown and Llanllwchaiarn)
- Maesmawr Hall, Llandinam
- Glas Hirfryn, Llansilin
