= Penarth (Newtown and Llanllwchaiarn) =

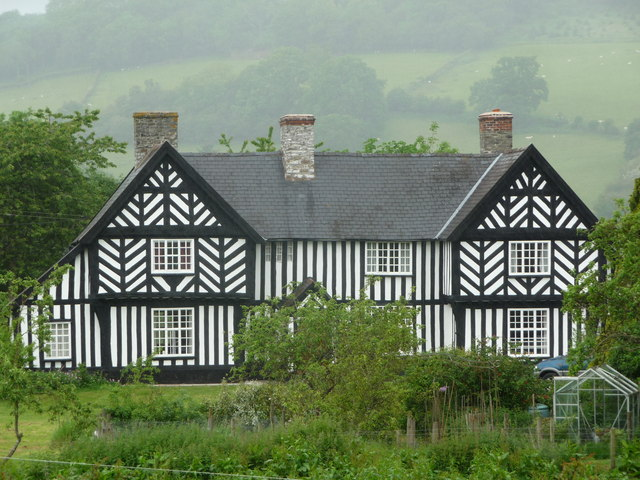
- Penarth, a black and white house near Newtown

- Location in Montgomeryshire
- 52.523043°N 3.268703°W
- Location: Newtown and Llanllwchaiarn, Montgomeryshire, Wales
- OS grid reference: SO1392992455

History
- Built: 16th Century
- Built for: Pryce Family

Site notes
- Architectural style: Timber framed Severn Valley House
- Restored: 1964
- Restored by: Mr & Mrs Higgs

Listed Building – Grade II*
- Designated: 18 July 1949
- Reference no.: 8217

Penarth is a timber-framed house set back from the A483 road near to Newtown, Wales, close to the banks of the river Severn. It is within the parish of Llanllwchaiarn, within the historic county of Montgomeryshire, which now forms part of Powys. It is amongst the best examples of the ‘‘Severn Valley’’ timber-framed houses. The Penarth vineyard stands within the grounds of the house.

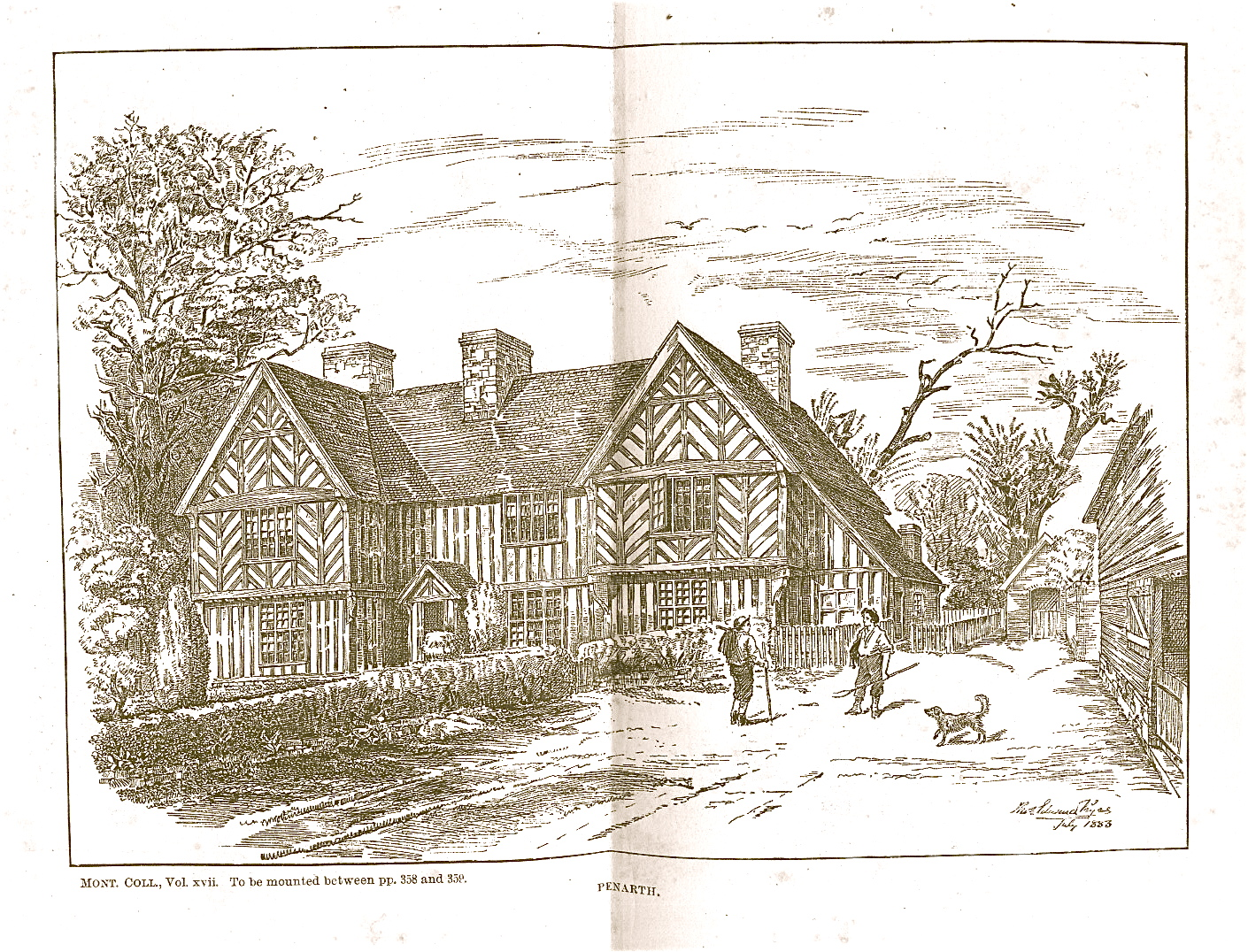
Penarth, near Newtown, Montgomeryshire 1873

== Architectural description ==
Penarth is a two storey hall house with two forward projecting gabled wings. The two bayed construction of the hall with a central cruck truss is likely to be the earliest part of the house and could be 15th century. It was originally suggested that it was an aisled hall, but restoration work in 1964 showed this was not the case. A chimney stack is positioned so that a Lobby entrance is formed, a typical feature of Severn Valley houses. The two gabled wings on either side of the hall are jettied with the second floor projecting forward and the timber framing forming a decorated geometric pattern. .

== History of Penarth ==
Penarth lies in Dyffryn Llanfair, an ancient township which lies to the south of the river Severn. The earliest known owner of Penarth was Richard Pryce, who in 1604 was commemorated in a poem by the Welsh Bard and Herald, Lewys Dwnn. Dwnn was lived in nearby Bettws Cedewain. Penarth continued in the Pryce family ownership and there are references to a later Richard Pryce in the Manorial records in 1696. In 1710 and 1717 an Edward Powell, Gent is mentioned as living at Penarth Ucha. The Rev John Parker, (noted for his diaries and drawings of Church screens), who was Rector of Llanmerewig (1827-1844), lived here. Mr and Mrs Higgs restored the house with grants from the Historic Buildings Council in 1964.

== Wine production at Penarth ==
Bernard and Tanya Herbert planted their first vines in 1999, and the acreage was increased 2 years later, so that all 10 acres of vines are now bearing fruit. Varieties that are grown include German and French varieties such as Madeleine Angevine. However, the majority of the vines are the classical ‘sparkling wine grapes’- Pinot Noir, Pinot Meunier and Chardonnay. The vineyard has no winery, and wines are being produced by Three Choirs at Newent.

== See also ==
- Great Cefnyberen
- Ty Mawr, Castle Caereinion
- Cilthriew, Kerry (Montgomeryshire)
- Maesmawr Hall, Llandinam
- Glas Hirfryn, Llansilin
- Lymore, (Montgomery)
- Trewern Hall

== Bibliography ==
- Oliver H N Llanllwchaiarn Church and Parish 2000
- Pryce T E Half-Timbered Houses of Montgomeryshire, (Part III, Penarth), "Montgomeryshire Collections" Vol 17, 1884, 149–164, 359–368.
- Smith P and Vaughan-Owen C E Penarth, a Montgomeryshire Aisled Hall, "Montgomeryshire Collections" Vol 58 pt ii, 1964, 107-113
- Scourfield R and Haslam R The Buildings of Wales: Powys; Montgomeryshire, Radnorshire and Breconshire. Yale University Press 2013
- Smith P Houses of the Welsh Countryside, 2nd Edition, 1988, HMSO/ RCAHMW
- Suggett R and Stevenson G Introducing Houses of the Welsh Countryside. Cyflwyno Cartrefi Cefn Gwlad Cymru. Y Lolfa/ RCAHMW, 2010
