= Glas Hirfryn =

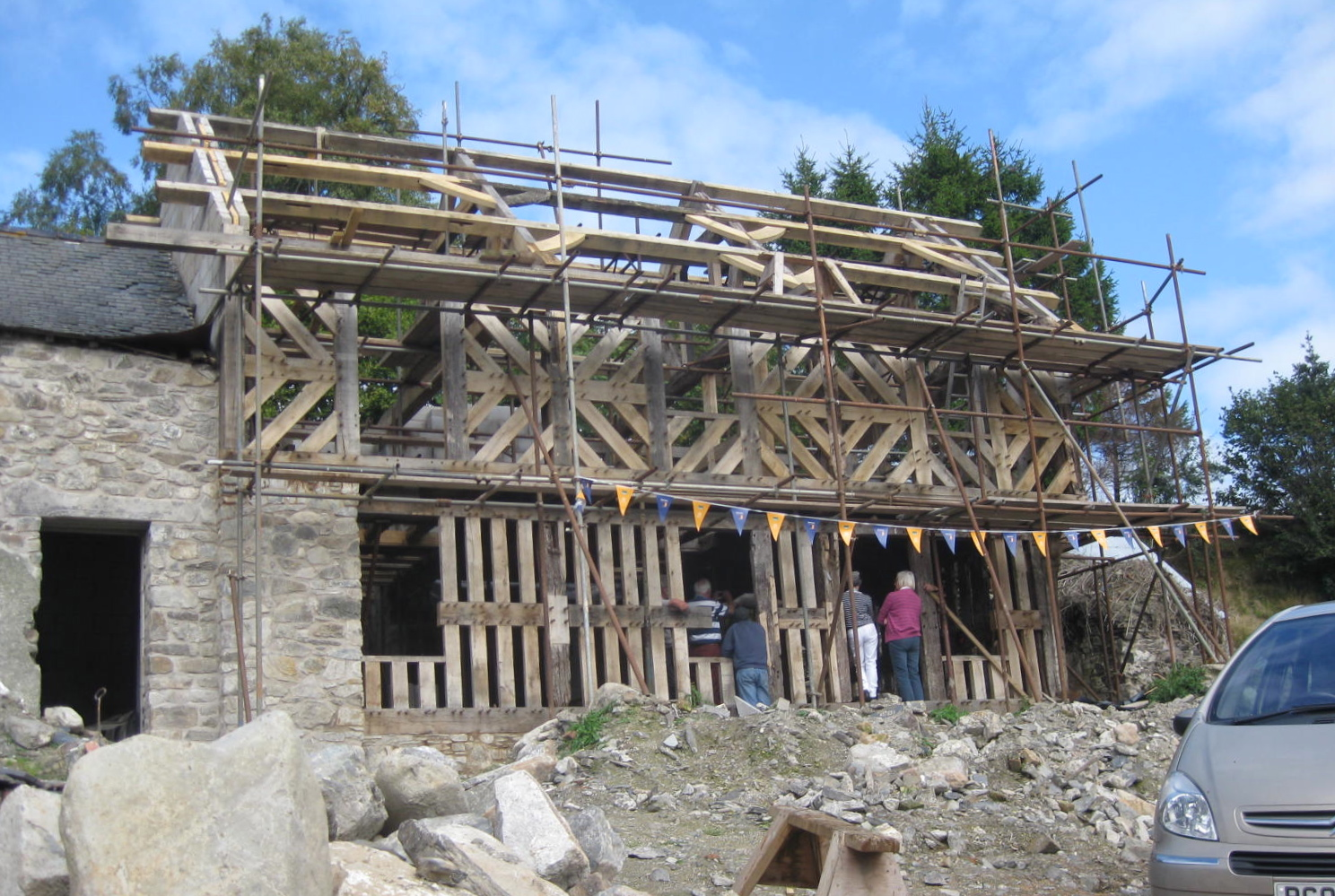
- Glas Hirfryn.Under Restoration, September 2014

- Location in Montgomeryshire
- 52.857975°N 3.253468°W
- Location: Glas Hirfryn, Llansilin, Montgomeryshire, Wales
- OS grid reference: SO 315706329681

History
- Built: c.1559 AD for Morus ap Dafydd of Glas-hirfryn

Site notes
- Architectural styles: Timber framed Storied and jettied hall house
- Restored: 2012–2014

Listed Building – Grade II
- Designated: 1 April 1966
- Reference no.: Cadw 646

Glas Hirfryn is a farm in Cwmdu, at east side of the road through the valley of the Lleiriog on the southern side of the Berwyn Mountains. It is in the community of Llansilin, which was formerly in Denbighshire, but since 1996 has been in the Montgomeryshire part of Powys. The timber-framed farmhouse, which stands within a group of farm buildings was abandoned in the mid-20th century, at which time it was listed as Grade II. The house has now been dated by dendrochronology to about 1559 AD or shortly afterwards.

By 2002 the building had largely collapsed, but since 2012 a restoration programme has been started under the supervision of architect Graham Moss and drawing on the expertise of the Clwyd-Powys Archaeological Trust (CPAT). The restoration work has been undertaken by Manor Joinery of Minsterley, Shropshire.

== Architecture ==
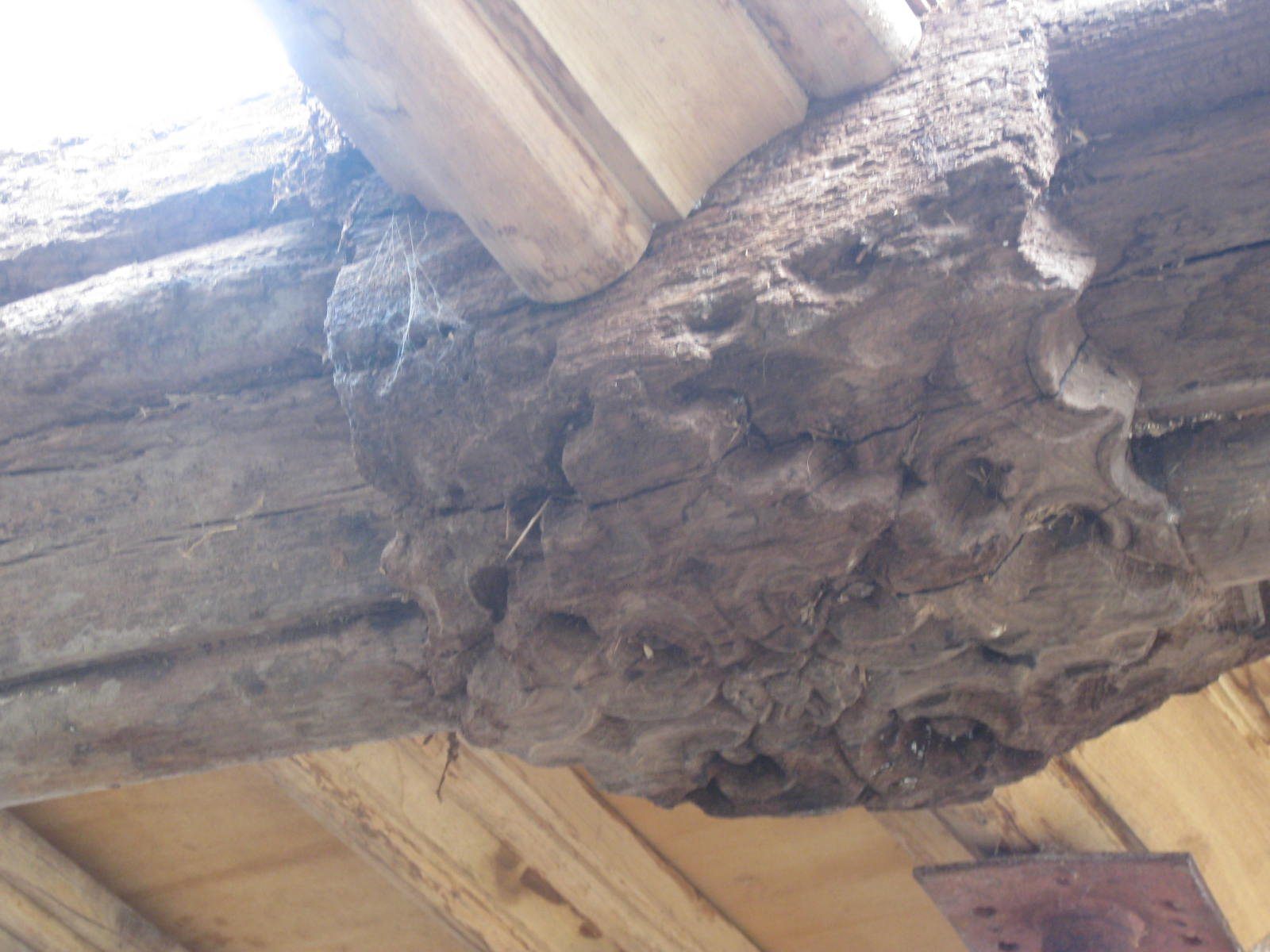
Glas Hirfryn, Llansilin. Decorative ceiling boss

The house represents a transitional phase in the development of the timber-framed houses in area from the cruck framed hall houses (such as Ty Draw at Llanarmon Mynydd Mawr and [aisled]-hall houses at Pen-y-Bryn, Llansilin and Hafod, Llansilin and Hen Blas in Llanrhaeadr-ym-Mochnant, to Renaissance and post-Medieval types. Glas Hirfryn is one of the first houses to be storied, rather than the hall being open to the roof. It is also of interest because it has a lateral stone chimney stack, set outside on the north side of the building. This contrasts with Severn Valley timber-framed houses of Montgomeryshire, which have a centrally placed chimney stack within the house and the entrance is placed on the side wall facing the chimney stack, which forms a lobby-entrance. On the ground floor in Glas Hirfryn, to the left of the entrance, there is a hall and the central beam is decorated with an elaborately carved decorative boss. There was a further chamber at the east end. On the outside on the ground floor the timber framing is close studded and was filled with vertical wattle and daub. The upper storey is decorated with repeating lozenge framing, a feature of other Montgomeryshire timber-framed houses.

== Architectural parallels ==
Glas Hirfryn is contemporary with Great Cefnyberen in the Vale of Kerry, dendrochronologically dated to 1545–60. This house has a jettied first floor supported by massive brackets, but unlike Glas Hirfyn it has a central chimney stack and rather than a lobby entrance has a chimney backing on to the entrance with a post and panel screen or cross passage of Smith's type B. Also in the Vale of Kerry, but just in Shropshire in Brompton and Rhiston is the Lack. This is a jettied house of the Montgomeryshire Lobby entrance type, with herringbone work in the upper story and Close studding to the lower floor. The use of a dragon beam- a diagonal beam in jettied at the corners in the interior – seems to be slightly later, and can be seen at Plasdauon in Carno and Maes Mawr at Llandinam. Examples of jettied timber-framing in Shropshire with a classification of their types is given by Madge Moran in Vernacular Buildings of Shropshire.

=== History of the house ===
The earliest known owner of Glas-hirfryn is 'Morus ap Dafydd of Glas-hirfryn' the husband of Magred, daughter of Lewys Wynn ap Morus Wynn of Moeliwrch, Llansilin, which lies just over 4 kilometres to the east. By the 1750s Glas Hirfryn was part of a larger estate and was tenanted by Richard Edwards who died in 1761 and he was followed by his son Hugh Edwards Richard, who died in 1777. In August 1827 Glas Hirfryn was sold by auction at the Cross Keys in Oswestry as part of a much larger estate by a firm of Liverpool auctioneers. Following this sale Glas Hirfryn came to be tenanted by Richard Jones(1783–1849) of Glyndyfrdwy. Richard and Ann Jones were ardent Wesleyan Methodists and established a meeting-house at Glas-hirfryn in 1837. The tenancy of the farm passed to John Jones on his father's death in 1849, but the landlord, the Rev J C Phillips put up the rent, which John Jones was unable to afford. In 1854 the Jones family purchased the farm and John Jones continued to live at Glas Hirfyn until his death in 1904. The life of the Jones family and the founding of the Moriah Wesleyan Chapel at Cymdu is described in Revd O. Madoc Roberts, Cofiant y Tri Brawd ('Memoir of the Three Brothers') 1906.

=== Literature ===
- Hubbard E, The Buildings of Wales: Clwyd, Penguin/ Yale 1986.
- Moran, Madge (2013). Vernacular Buildings of Shropshire. Logaston Press. ISBN 9781873827932.
- Revd O. Madoc Roberts, Cofiant y Tri Brawd, ('Memoir of the Three Brothers') 1906.
- Scourfield R and Haslam R, Buildings of Wales: Powys; Montgomeryshire, Radnorshire and Breconshire, 2nd edition, Yale University Press 2013, 251.
- Smith, Peter (1988). Houses of the Welsh Countryside (Enlarged 2nd ed.). London: Royal Commission on the Ancient and Historical Monuments of Wales, H.M. Stationery Office. ISBN 9780113000128.
- Suggett R and Stevenson G., Introducing Houses of the Welsh Countryside, Y Lolfa, 2010.

== Glas Hirfryn gallery ==
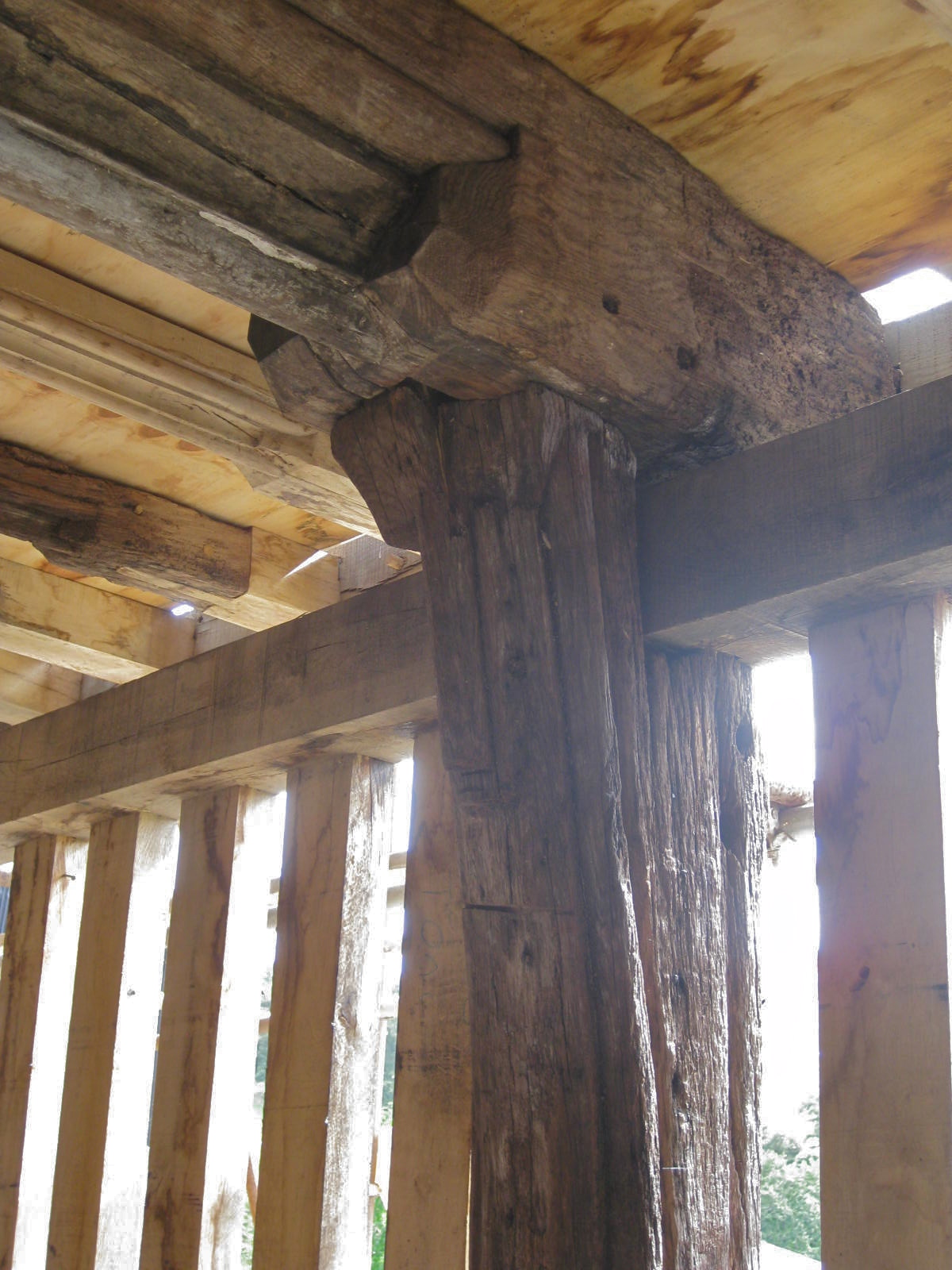
Glas Hirfryn, Llansilin. Close studded timber framing on ground floor

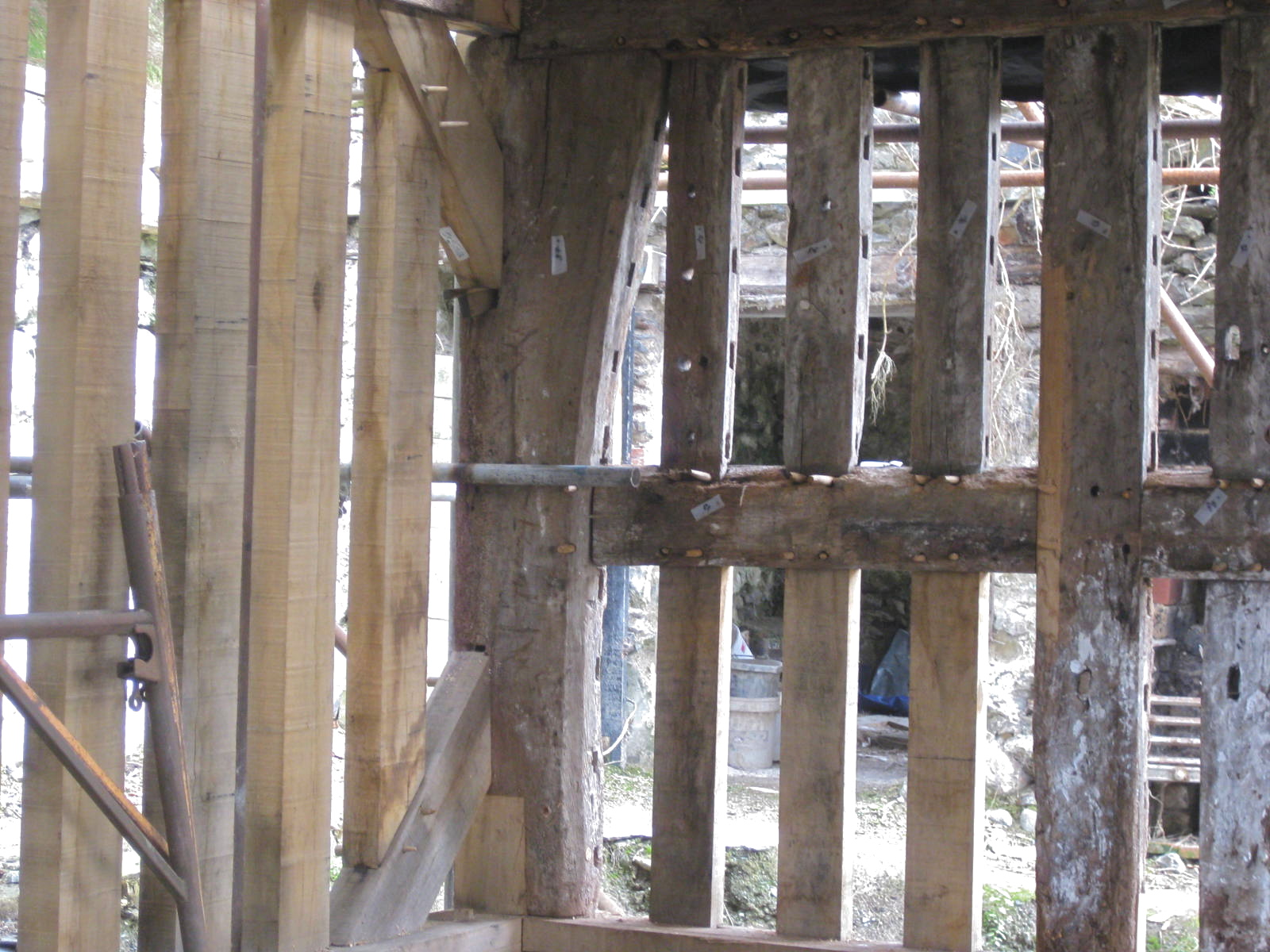
Glas Hirfryn, Llansilin. Close studded timber work on ground floor

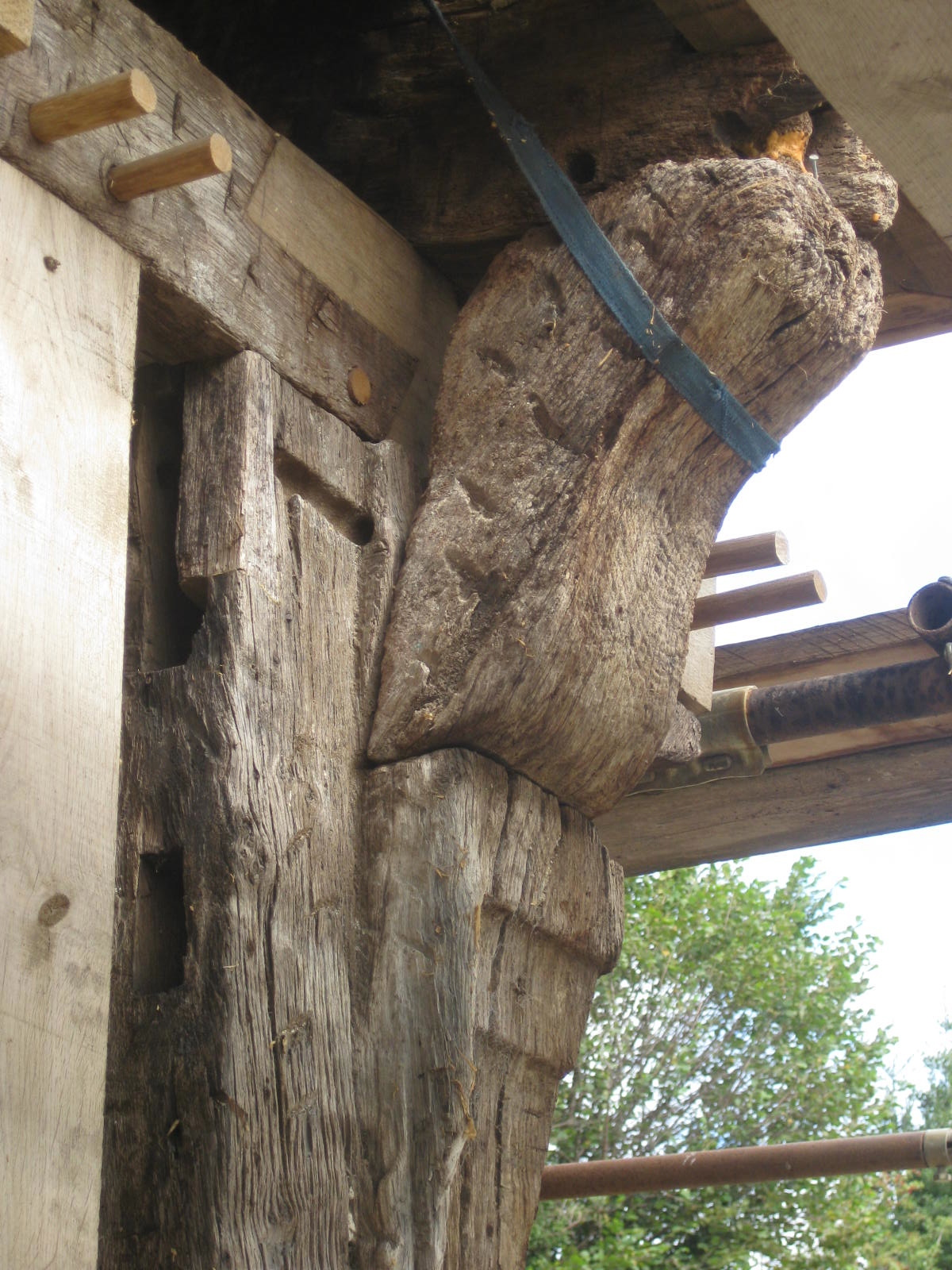
Glas Hirfryn, Llansilin. Exterior bracket to jetty.

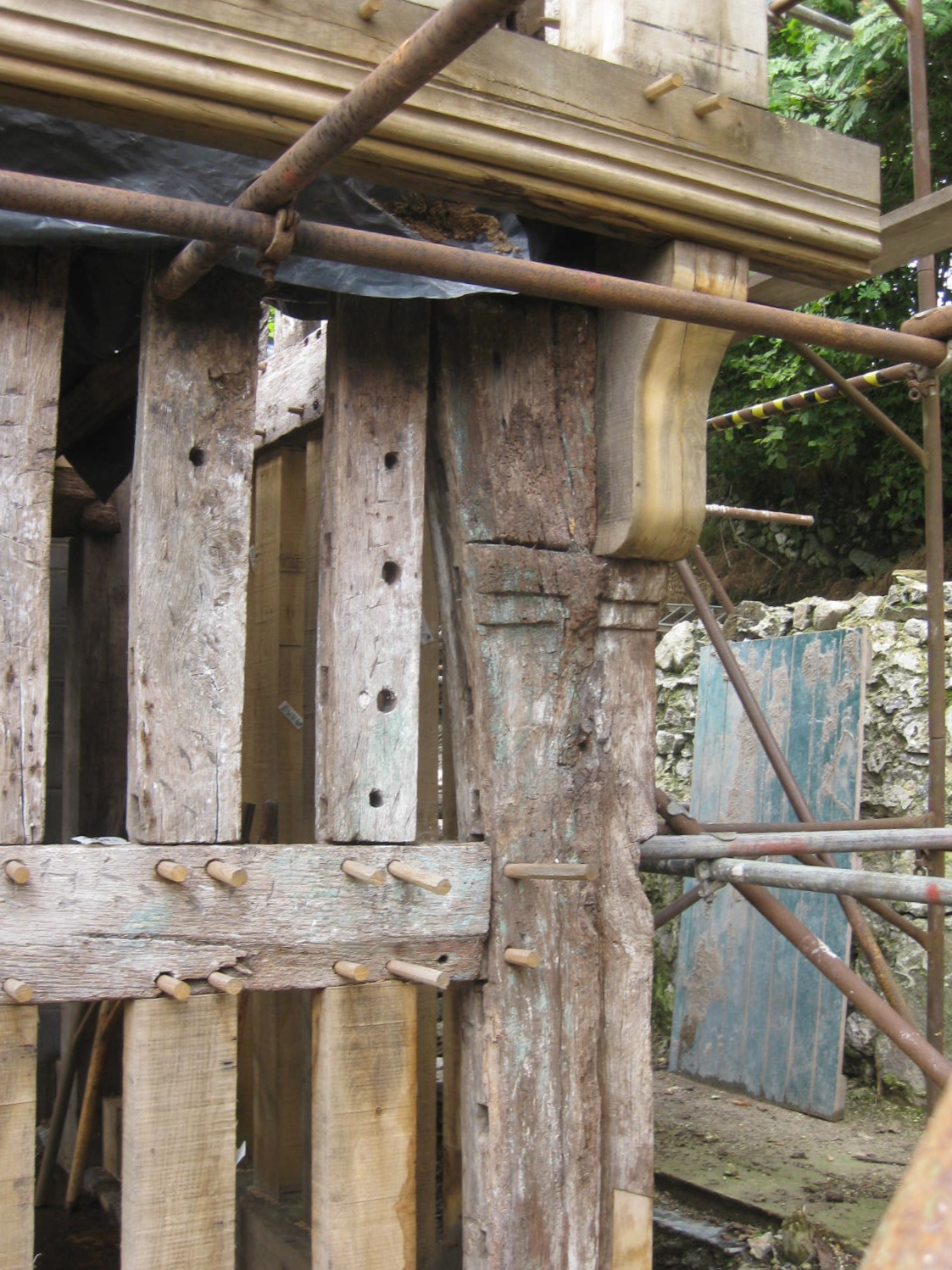
Glas Hirfryn, Llansilin. Exterior bracket to jetty.

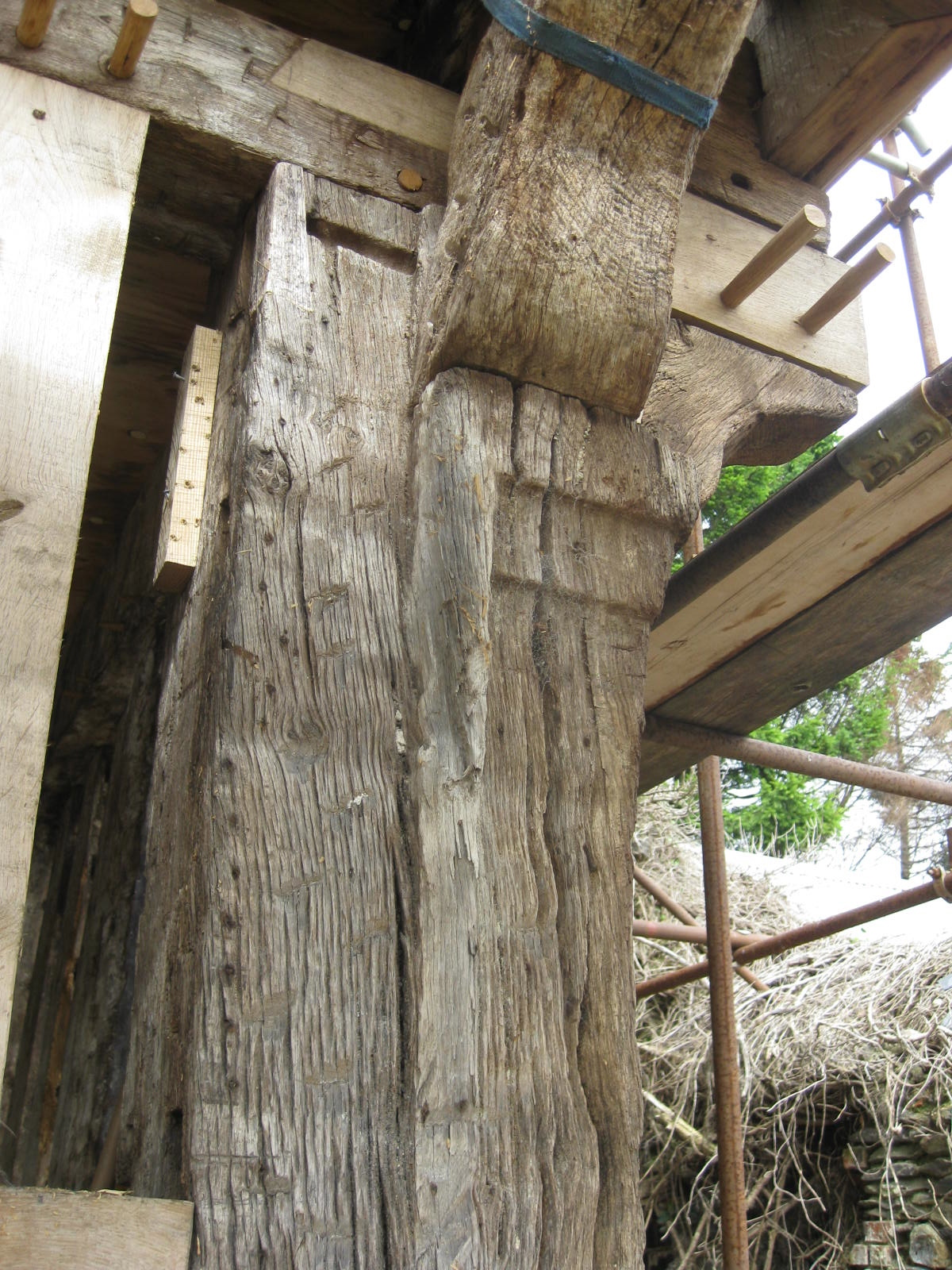
Glas Hirfryn, Llansilin. Exterior bracket to jetty.

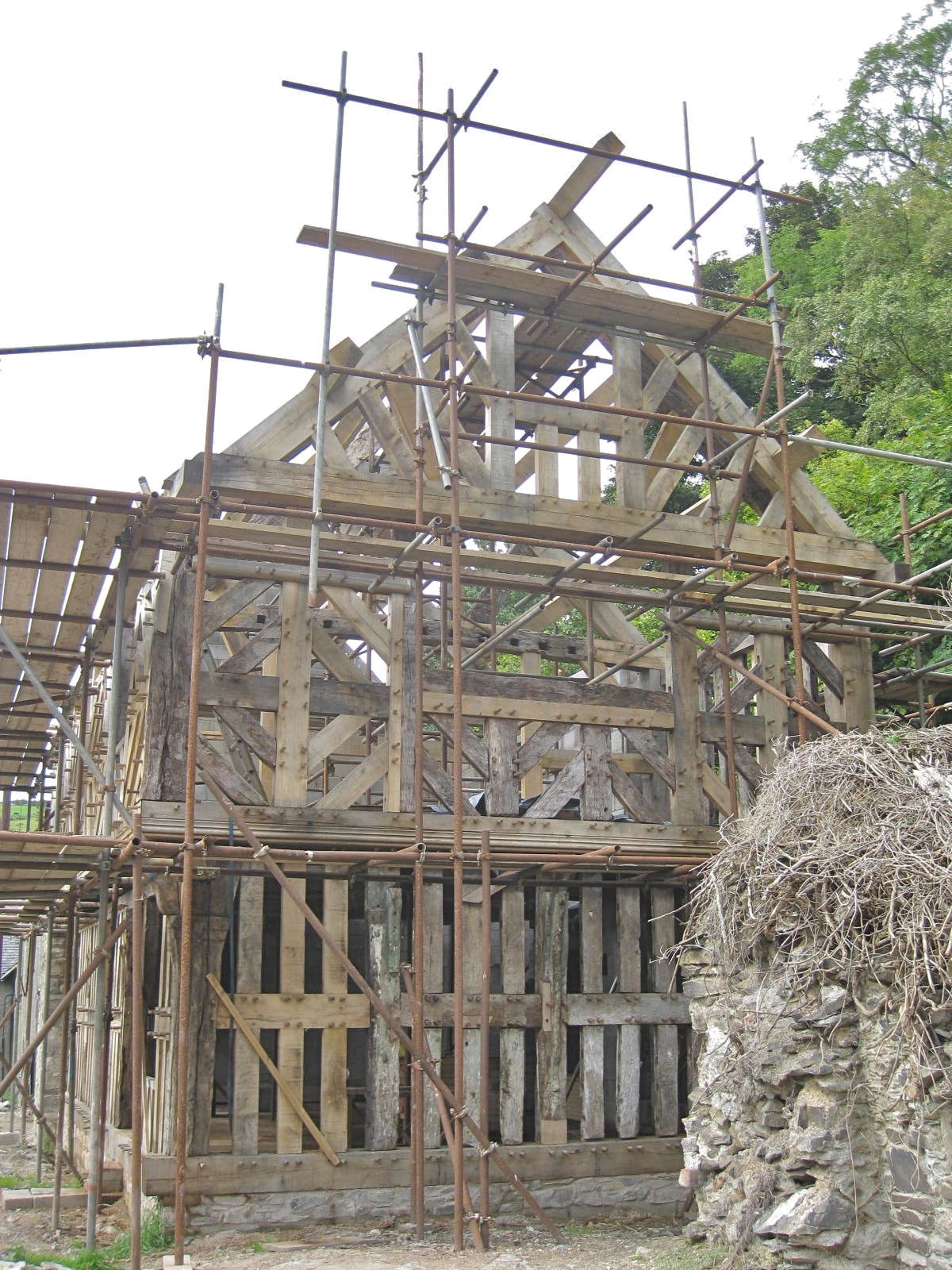
Glas Hirfryn, Llansilin East gable.Under Restoration, September 2014

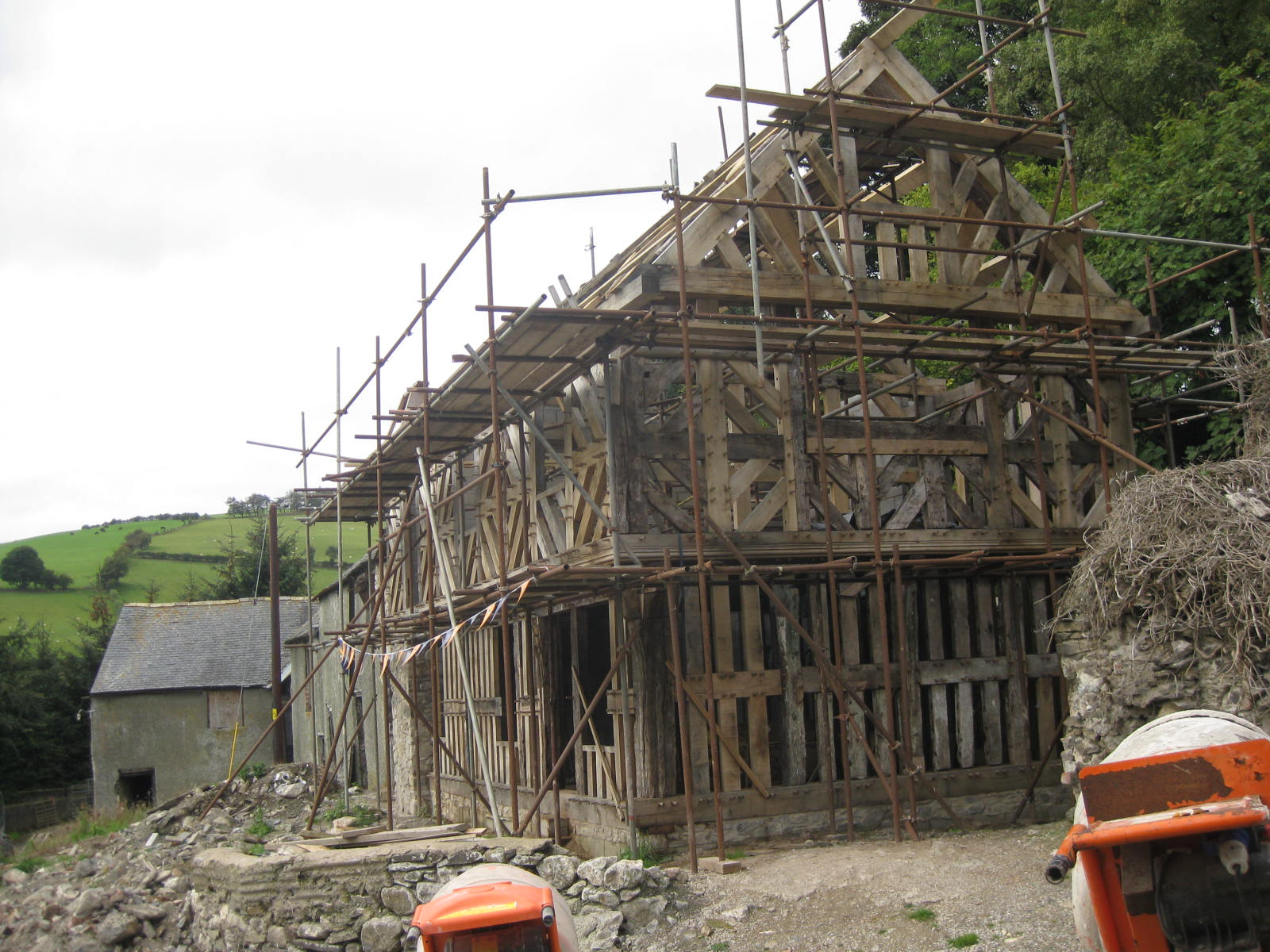
Glas Hirfryn, Llansilin East gable.Under Restoration, September 2014

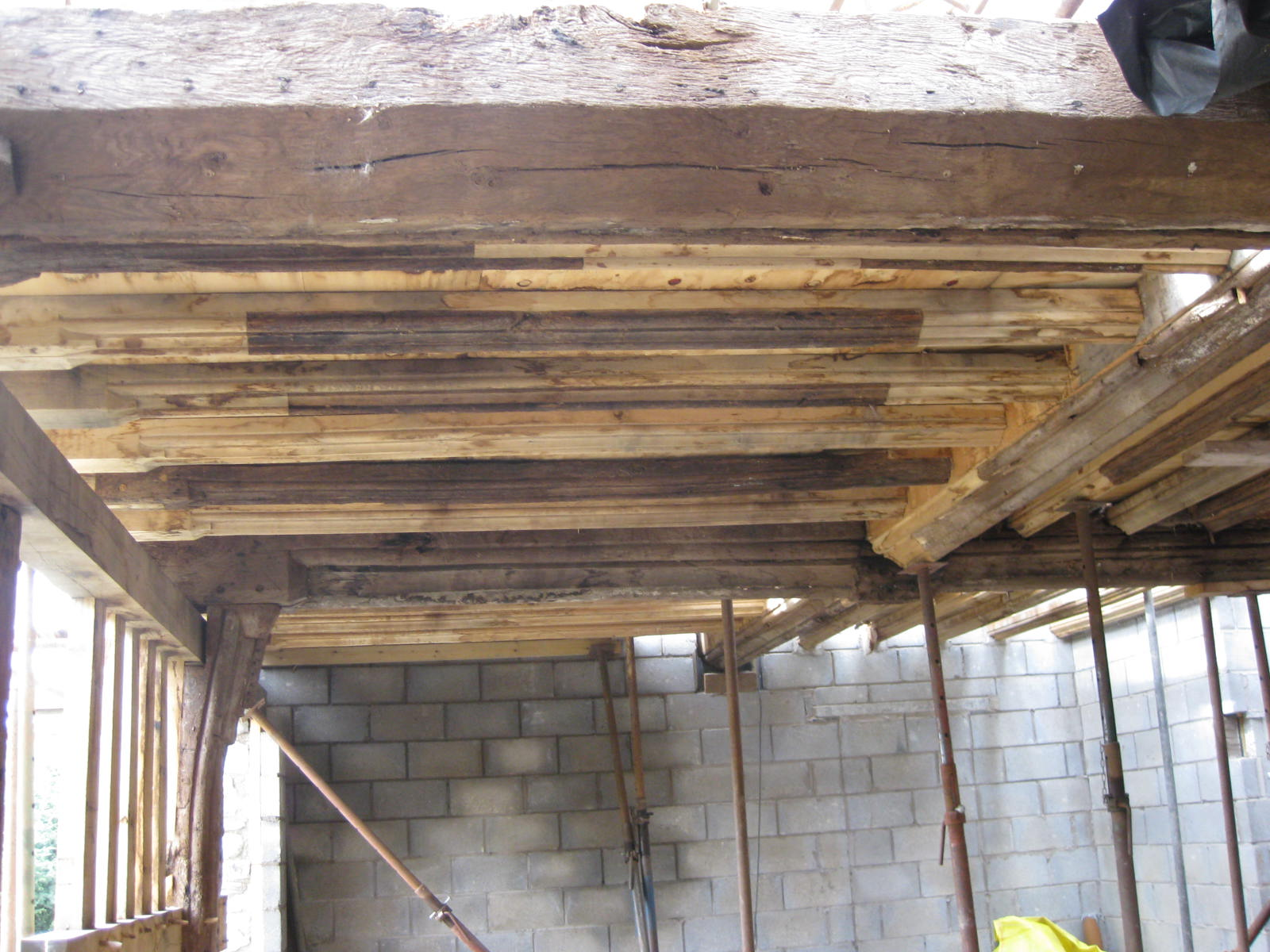
Glas Hirfryn, Llansilin. Ceiling joists.

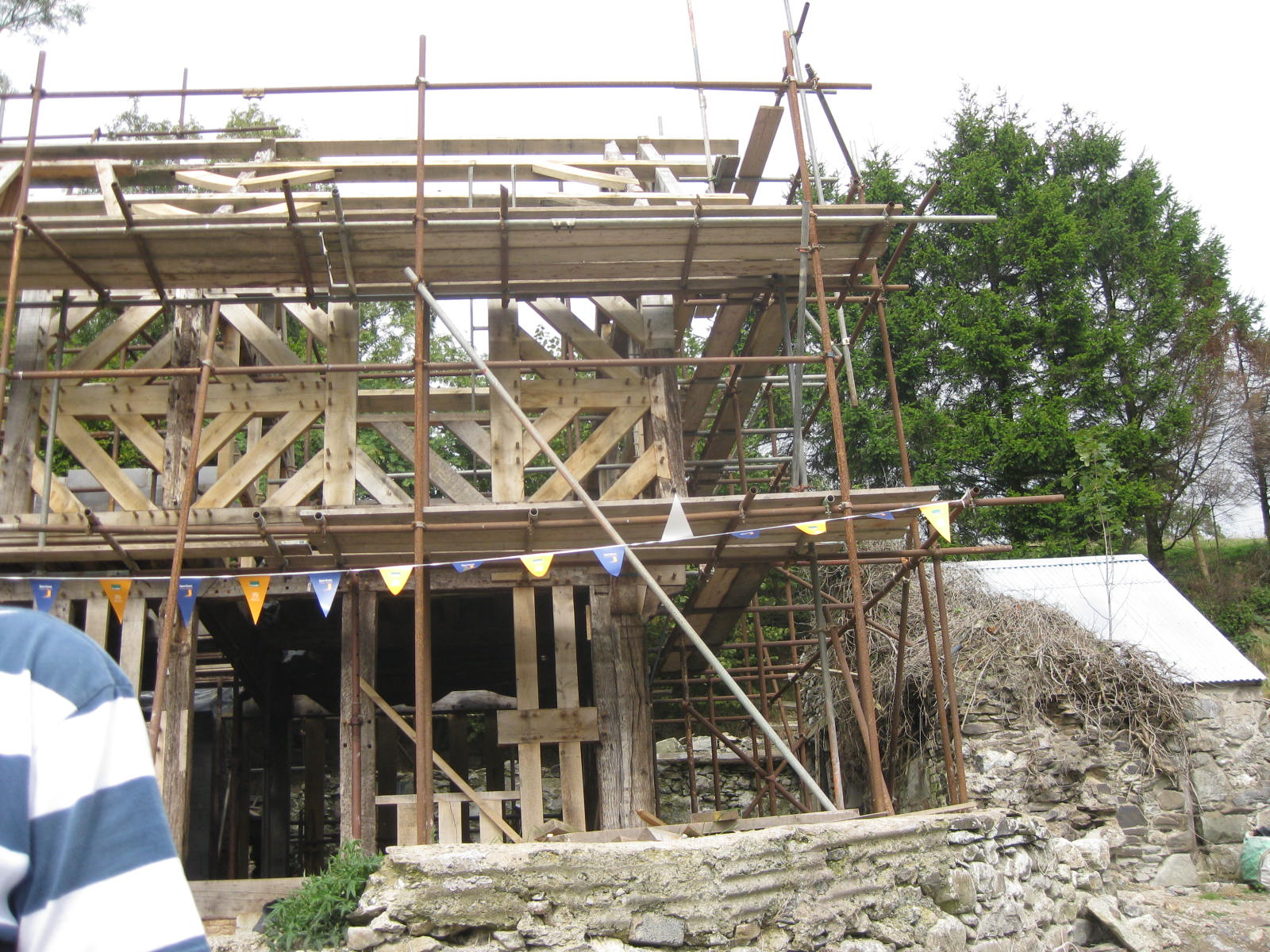
Glas Hirfryn, Llansilin. Under Restoration, September 2014

== See also ==
Timber-framed houses in Montgomeryshire:

- Cilthriew, Kerry (Montgomeryshire)
- Great Cefnyberen
- Penarth (Newtown and Llanllwchaiarn)
- Maesmawr Hall, Llandinam
- Ty Mawr, Castle Caereinion
- Lymore, (Montgomery)
- The Lack, Brompton
