= Tŷ Mawr, Castle Caereinion =

Tŷ Mawr, Castle Caerenion
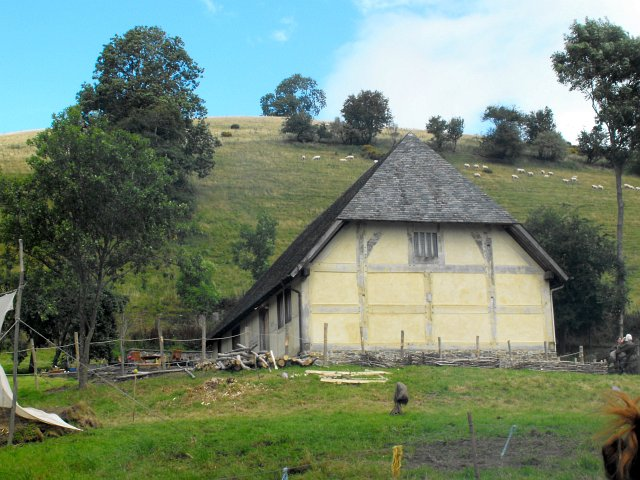

- Location in Wales Powys

General information
- Location: Powys, Wales, UK
- Coordinates: 52.630738°N 3.223720°W
- OS grid: SJ 17273 04365

Tŷ Mawr is a Grade I-listed timber framed house in the township of Trefnant in the historic parish of Castle Caereinion, Montgomeryshire, Wales.

Originally occupied by the Lloyd family, descendants of Alo ap Rhiwallon who had settled in Trefnant in the 13th century, the house was re-discovered in 1971 and fully restored to its late 17th-century appearance in 1997–8. The restoration gained the RICSs "Building of the Year" award in 2000. In 2001, a volume of the Montgomeryshire Collections was devoted to a detailed description of the discovery and the research programme that was carried out on the building. The house is open on an occasional basis or by appointment.

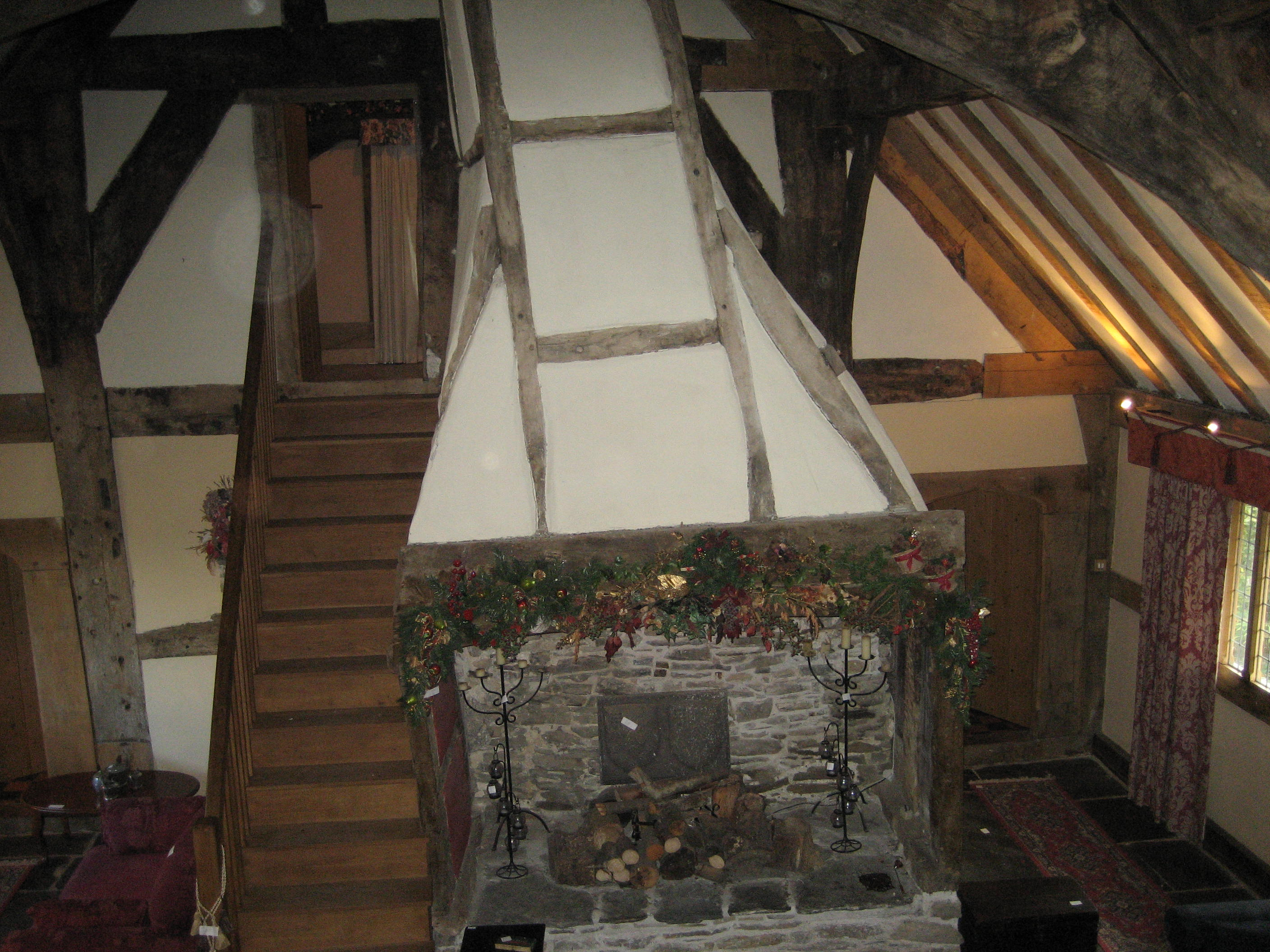
Smoke Hood to Fireplace dated denrochronologically to 1631

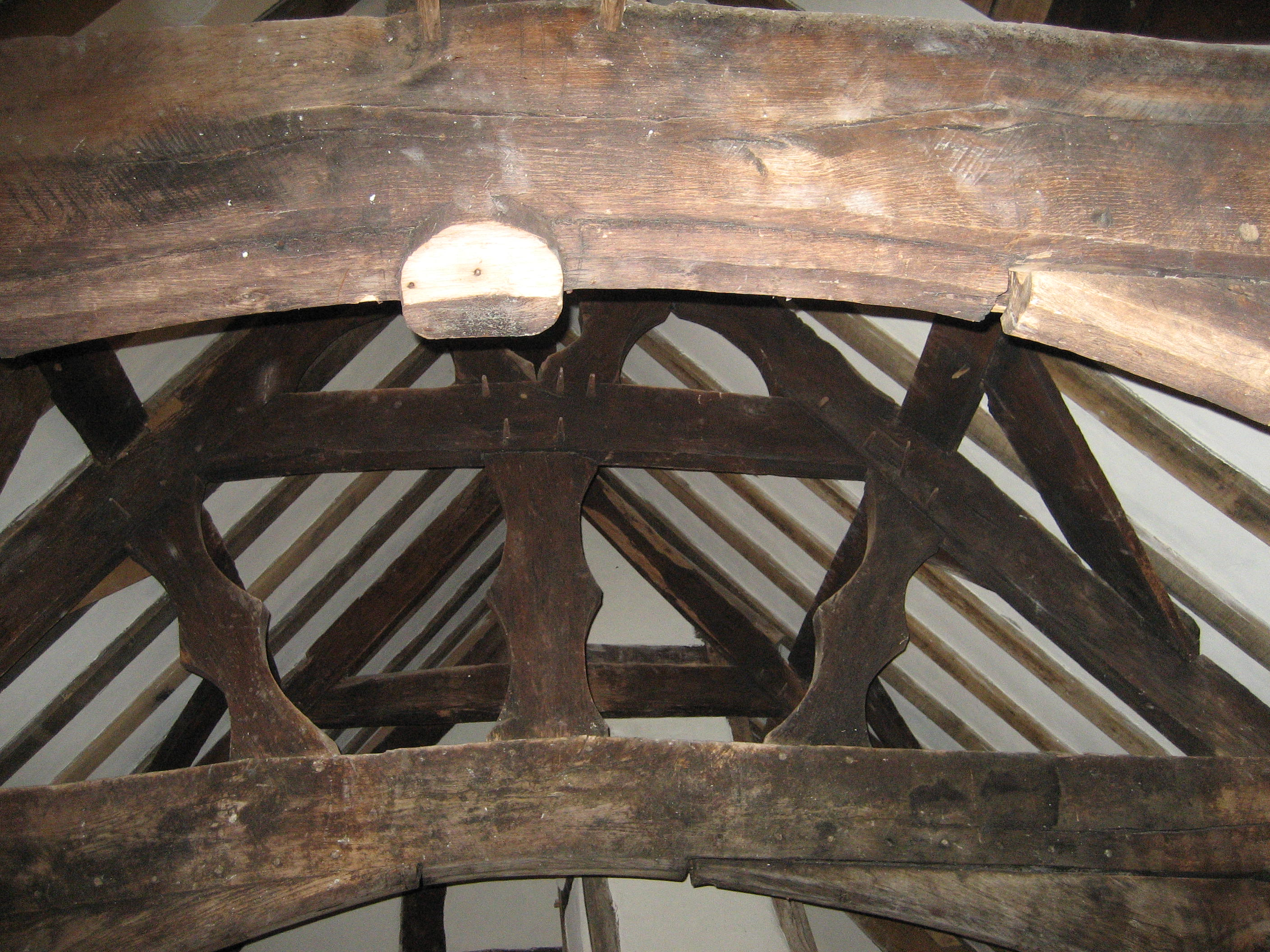
Decorated timber truss, Tŷ Mawr, Castle Caereinion.

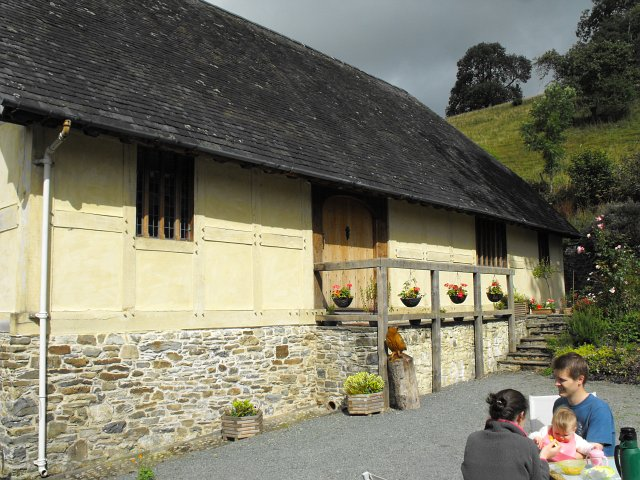
Tŷ Mawr, Castle Caereinion

== Discovery and reconstruction ==
Tŷ Mawr was discovered by Peter Smith and Cecil Vaughan Owen in 1971, by when it was used as a farm building, clad in corrugated sheeting. The house was the subject of a building survey in 1979. In 1997 dendrochronological dating of the building was commissioned by Cadw, which showed a felling date of 1460 AD for the timber used in the initial construction of the building. Archaeological excavations were carried out in conjunction with the building survey in 1979, and again in 1997 by the Clwyd-Powys Archaeological Trust, which established the main phases of occupation of the house. This showed that the house was a good example of a Welsh longhouse with a cattle byre at one end. A study of the carpentry techniques and the geometric basis for the laying-out of the house was also undertaken. Other studies included agricultural evidence including the survival of early fruit trees in the surrounding hedge rows and the landscape history of Trefnant township. The property had been purchased by the Secretary of State for Wales in 1975 for £2,000 and was leased back to Powis Estates for 999 years by the Welsh Office in 1997. Restored for Cadw in 1997–8 by Michael Garner, the work being undertaken by Frank Galliers and Co. of Shrewsbury. The house is a Grade I listed building.

== Architecture ==
The limewashed box-framed house, four bays long, sits on a stone platform built into the hillside, under a broad half-hipped roof (now replaced with tiles rather than slates, for which evidence was found in the archaeological excavations thatch). The principal timbers are tree-ring dated to 1460: dendrochronology has also provided dates of 1594, when a first floor was inserted within the hall, and 1631 when the internal timber-framed smoke-hood was added. The restoration has retained the smoke-hood, but has otherwise restored the three-unit plan of storeyed units at either end of the open, aisled hall. The two trusses within the hall are a single pair of chamfered wooden speres or posts set in the floor and forming a box-frame which carries the roof, and a pair of arch-braced base-crucks with two tiers of cusped struts above the tie-beam, which spanned the whole width of 7.5 m. The analogies are with the partly aisled halls of important houses in north-east Wales and north-west England. Gable and partition trusses, also aisled. Wind-braces were employed both below the wall-plate and along the purlins

== History ==
Descended from the Alo ap Rhiwallon family (who had settled there in the 13th century), the builder of Tŷ Mawr was probably Dafydd ap Gwilym, the great-great-grandson of Alo ap Rhiwallon. The Lloyd family became the principal landowners in the Trefnant and eventually in 1911 all of Trefnant township had been acquired by the Earl of Powis's estates.

== See also ==
Timber-framed houses in Montgomeryshire:

- Cilthriew, Kerry (Montgomeryshire)
- Great Cefnyberen
- Penarth (Newtown and Llanllwchaiarn)
- Maesmawr Hall, Llandinam
- Glas Hirfryn, Llansilin
- Trewern Hall
