= Caer =

Placename element in Welsh meaning "stronghold", "fortress", or "citadel"

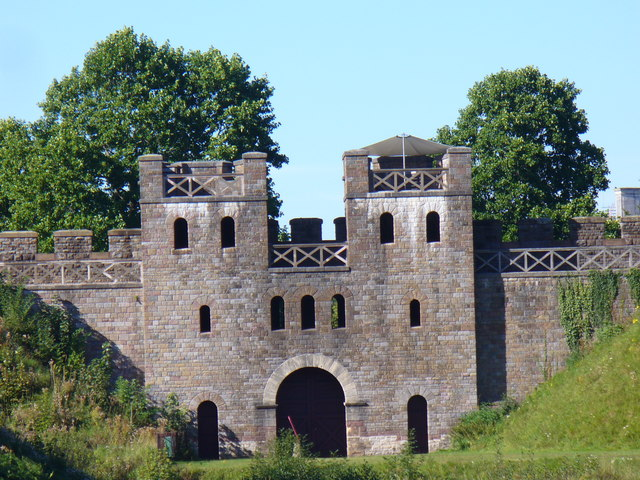
The north gate of Cardiff Castle, following the old Roman fortifications and rebuilt along Roman lines.

Caer (Welsh pronunciation: [kɑːɨr]; Old Welsh: cair or kair) is a placename element in Welsh meaning "stronghold", "fortress", or "citadel", roughly equivalent to an Old English suffix (-ceaster) now variously written as -caster, -cester, and -chester. (Note: More precisely, these English placename elements derive from Latin castrum ("fortified post") and its plural form castra ("military camp"), making them the more precise equivalent of the Welsh castell.)

In modern Welsh orthography, caer is usually written as a prefix, although it was formerly—particularly in Latin—written as a separate word. The Breton equivalent is kêr, which is present in many Breton placenames as the prefix Ker-.

== Etymology ==
The term is thought to have derived from the Brittonic *kagro- and to be cognate with cae ("field, enclosed piece of land"). Although stone castles were largely introduced to Wales by the invading Normans, "caer" was and remains used to describe the settlements around some of them as well. An example is the Roman fort at Caernarfon, formerly known in Welsh as Caer Seiont from its position on the Seiont; the later Edwardian castle and its community were distinguished as Caer yn Arfon ("fort in Arfon", the latter being a district name (Cantref Arfon) from "ar Fôn", "(land) opposite Môn or Anglesey"). However, the modern names of the Roman fort and Edwardian castle themselves are now Segontiwm or Castell Caernarfon, while the communities carry on the name caer.

Note that the term is not believed to be related to the Irish cathair ("city"), which is instead derived from Proto-Celtic *katrixs, *catarax ("fortification").

== Britain ==
Gildas's account of the Saxon invasions of Britain claimed that there were 28 fortified Roman cities (Latin: civitas) on the island, without listing them. (Note: De Excidio Britanniae, § 3. (in Latin) Cited in the "Civitas" entry of Celtic Culture.) The History of the Britons traditionally attributed to Nennius includes a list of the 28, all of which are called "caer". (Note: Latin names according to Mommsen's edition of Nennius, translations and modern equivalents according to Ford, Ussher, or as otherwise noted.) Controversy exists over whether this list includes only Roman cities or a mixture of Roman cities and non-Roman settlements. Some of the place names that have been proposed include:

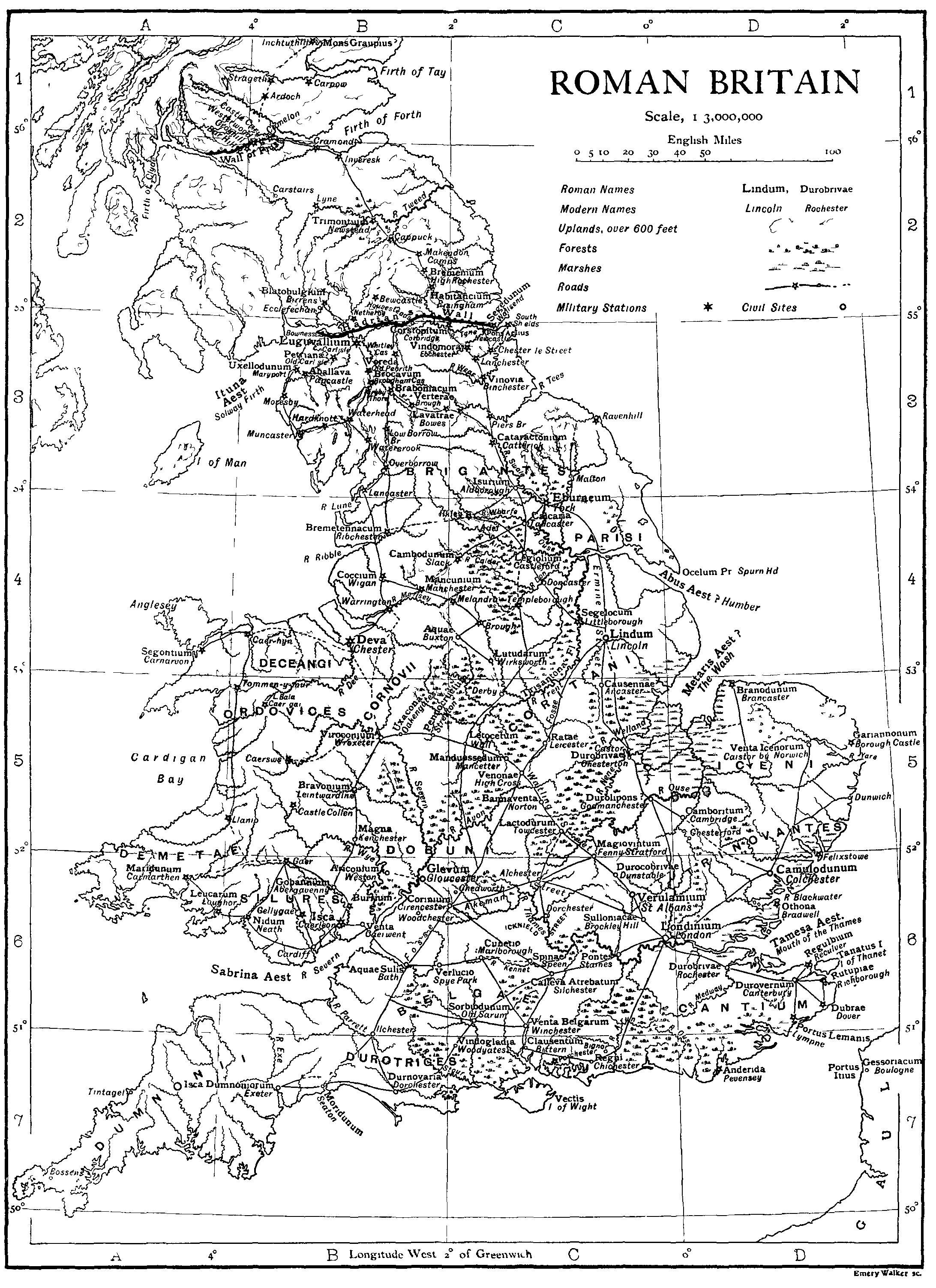
Roman Britain (1911).

- Cair Brithon ("Fort of the Britons": Dumbarton in Strathclyde (Note: Bishop Ussher argued for Bristol.))
- Cair Caratauc ("Fort Rampart": Salisbury? Sellack?)
- Cair Ceint ("Fort Kent": Canterbury)
- Cair Celemion (Camalet? (Note: Usser, following John Leland.) Silchester?)
- Cair Colun ("Fort Colonia": Colchester?)
- Cair Custoeint ("Fort Constantius or Constantine": Caernarfon; (Note: Bishop Ussher cites another passage in Nennius: "Here, says Nennius, Constantius the Emperor (the father probably of Constantine the Great) died; that is, near the town of Cair Segeint, or Custoient, in Carnarvonshire". Nennius stated that the emperor's inscribed tomb was still present in his day. Ford credits this to Constantine, son of Saint Elen.) or poss. a Devonian hillfort (Note: Per Ford, who ascribed Nennius's "Caer-Custoeint" to one of the Dumnonian kings named Constantine.))
- Cair Daun ("Fort Don": Doncaster)
- Cair Draitou (Drayton? Dunster?)
- Cair Ebrauc ("Fort York": York)
- Cair Grauth ("Fort Granta": Cambridge (Note: Although note that Bishop Ussher ascribed this to the Cambridge in Gloucestershire.))
- Cair Guent ("Fort Venta": Caerwent or Winchester)
- Cair Guiragon ("Fort Weorgoran": Worcester)
- Cair Guorthigirn ("Fort Vortigern": Little Doward? Carmarthen?)
- Cair Guricon (Warwick? Wroxeter?)
- Cair Legeion Guar Usic ("Fort Legion on the Usk": Caerleon-upon-Usk)
- Cair Legion ("Fort Legion": Chester)
- Cair Lerion ("Fort Leir": Leicester)
- Cair Ligualid ("Fort Luguwalos": Carlisle)
- Cair Luit Coyt ("Fort Grey Wood": Wall (Note: Henry of Huntington previously ascribed it to Lincoln, which was followed until the 19th century, when Bradley placed it at Lichfield, thinking it to be the Roman Letocetum. Instead, excavations have shown that Letocetum was located at nearby Wall instead.))
- Cair Lundem ("Fort Londinium": London (Note: Both Ussher and Ford use the transcription Lundein; with regard to Mommsen, note the similarity with Lindum, the Roman name for present-day Lincoln, and the generic name *Lindon, "lake".))
- Cair Maunguid (Manchester?)
- Cair Meguaid ("Fort Mediolanum": Meifod? Llanfyllin? Caersws? in Powys)
- Cair Mincip ("Fort Municipium": St Albans)
- Cair 'Pensa vel Coyt' ("Fort Penselwood": (Note: Coit is Welsh for "woods" or "forest". Ford takes the name as a single construction "Caer-Pensa-Uel-Coyt" ("Fort Penselwood"), while Mommsen and Ussher treat vel as the Latin word for or: "Cair Pensa or Coyt".) Exeter? Ilchester?)
- Cair Peris (Portchester? Builth Wells?)
- Cair Segeint ("Fort Seiont": Caernarfon; or poss. Silchester)
- Cair Urnarc (Wroxeter? Dorchester?)

=== Wales ===
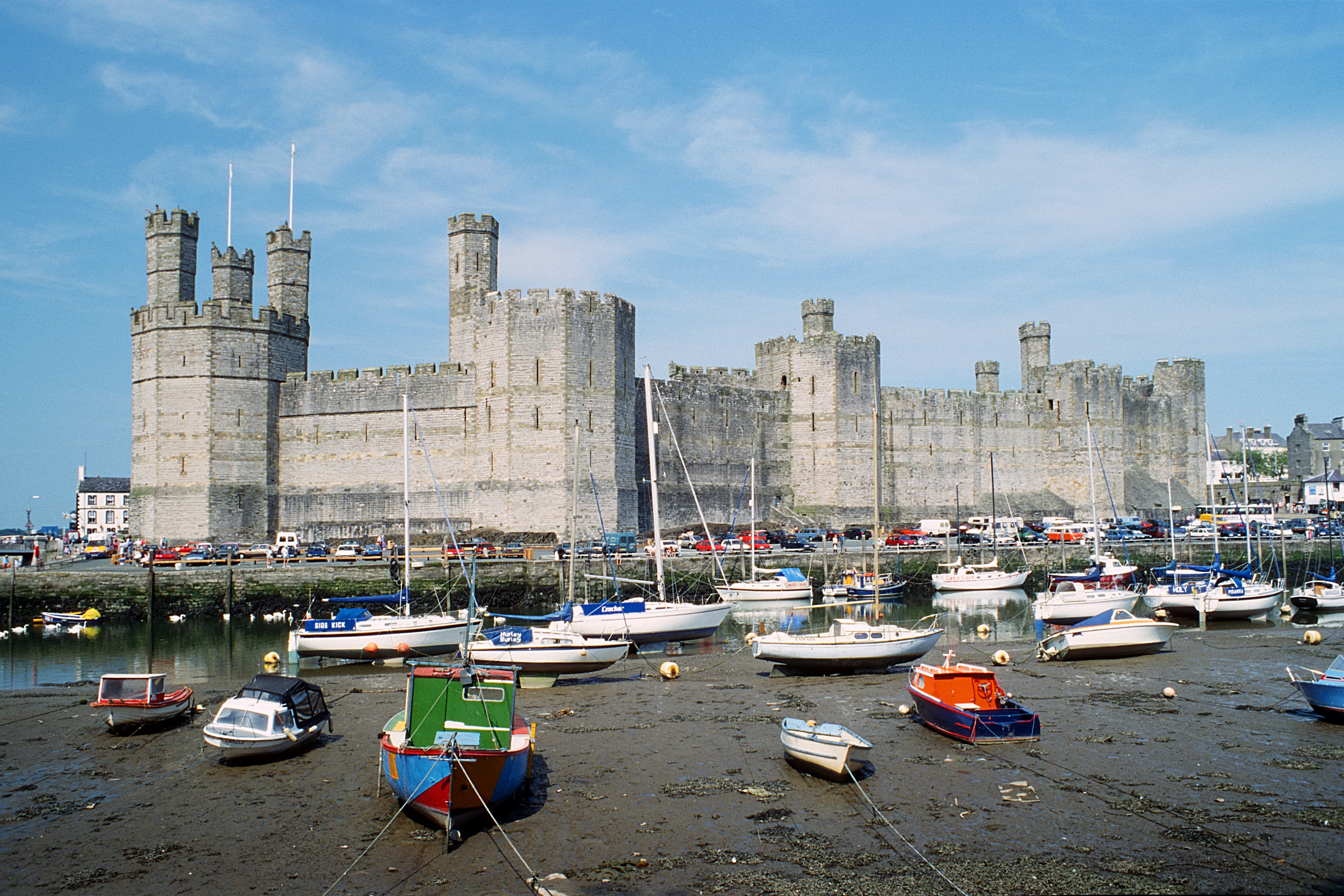
Caernarfon derives its name from the Edwardian Caernarfon Castle

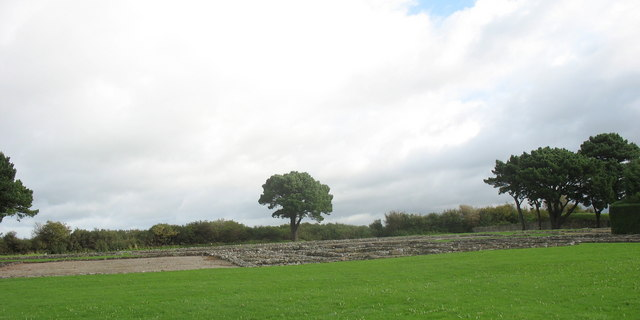
The Roman fort now known as Segontium derived its name from a latinization of the British community along the Afon Seiont

The element caer, sometimes anglicized as car, is found in several place-names in Wales such as:

- Caerau, Glamorgan ("Forts")
- Caereinion, Montgomeryshire ("Fort on the Einion")
- Caerfallwch, Flintshire ("Afallach's fort")
- Caerfarchell, Pembrokeshire ("Marchell's fort")
- Carmarthen, Carmarthenshire (Caerfyrddin, "Merlin's fort").
- Caergeiliog, Anglesey ("Fort of the cockrell")
- Caergwrle, Flintshire ("Fort of the crane-wood")
- Caerleon, Newport (Caerllion, "Fort Legion")
- Caernarfon, Caernarfonshire ("Fort Arfon")
- Caerphilly, Glamorgan (Caerffili, "Fort Ffili")
- Caerrhun, Caernarfonshire ("Fort of Rhun")
- Caersws, Montgomeryshire ("Susan's (Shoshana's) fort")
- Caerwent, Monmouthshire ("Fort Venta")
- Cardiff, Glamorgan (Caerdydd, "Fort Taf")
- Carew, Pembrokeshire
- Gaerwen, Anglesey (Caerwen, "white fort")
- Holyhead, Anglesey (Caergybi, "Fort Cybi")

=== England ===
The Cumbric language was spoken in Northern England until the Medieval era in which the element caer ("fort") was used in naming places. It also appears in Cornish place-names as Ker-.

- Caermote, Cumberland (Caermollt, "Fort of the wether")
- Cardew, Cumberland (Caerdu, "Black fort")
- Cardunneth, Cumberland (Caerdunawd, "Dünǭd's fort")
- Cardurnock, Cumberland (Caerdwrnog, "Fort of the fist-sized stones")
- Cargo, Cumberland (Caergoll, "Fort of hazel")
- Carhullan, Westmorland ("Fort of Holland")
- Carrick, Northumberland (Caerwig, "vicus fort")
- Carlatton, Cumberland ("Fort of the leek enclosure")
- Carlisle, Cumberland (Caerliwelydd, "Fort Luguwalos")
- Carmolt, Cumberland (Caermollt, "Fort of the wether")
- Carrycoats, Northumberland (Caerycoed, "Fort of the wood")
- Carvoran, Northumberland (Caerferin, "Fort of the Morini")
- Kerrier, Cornwall

Caer is also found in Welsh exonyms for English cities.

- Cambridge (Caergrawnt, "Fort Granta")
- Canterbury (Caergaint, "Fort Kent")
- Chester (Caer, "Fort")
- Chichester (Caerfuddai)
- Durham (Caerweir, "Fort of the Wear")
- Gloucester (Caerloyw)
- Exeter (Caerwysg, "Fort Usk", also Cornish Karesk)
- Lancaster (Caerhirfryn)
- Leicester (Caerlŷr, "Fort Leir")
- Lichfield (Caerlwytgoed, "Fort Grey Wood")
- Salisbury (Caersallog)
- Winchester (Caerwynt)
- Worcester (Caerwrangon)

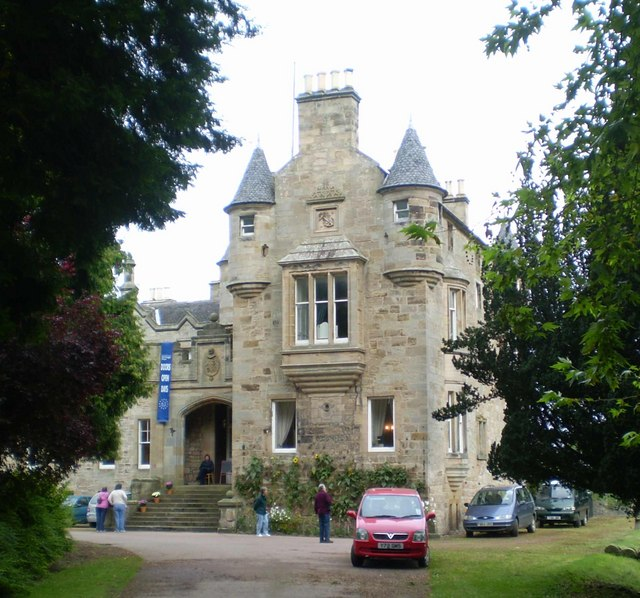
Carriden House, a refurbished Roman fort which formerly formed part of the Antonine Wall in Scotland.

=== Scotland ===
Cumbric and Pictish were Brittonic languages spoken in Scotland until around the 12th century, and caer ("fort") was a place-naming element in both languages.

- Caerketton, Midlothian ("Fort of Catel")
- Caerlanrig, Roxburghshire (Caerllanerch; "Fort Clearing")
- Caerlaverock, Dumfriesshire ("Fort of Llywarch")
- Carcluie, Ayrshire ("Fort of Clewein")
- Carden, Fife. Formerly Cardenni
- Cardonald, Renfrewshire ("Duμnwal's fort")
- Carleith, Dunbartonshire
- Carmichael, Lanarkshire ("Fort of Saint Michael")
- Carmuirs, Stirlingshire
- Carmurie, Fife ("Fort of the Sea")
- Carmyllie, Angus ("Fort of the warrior")
- Carpow, Perthshire (Caerpwll; "Fort of the sluggish stream")
- Carriden, West Lothian ("Fort Eidyn")
- Carruthers, Dumfriesshire ("Fort of Rhodri")
- Carstairs, Lanarkshire ("Fort of the Tarras")
- Crail, Fife ("Fort of the rock")
- Cramond, Midlothian ("Fort Almond")
- Kair, Kincardineshire ("Fort")
- Keir, Aberdeenshire ("Fort")
- Keir, Dumfries-shire ("Fort")
- Keir, Stirlingshire ("Fort")
- Keirhill, West Lothian
- Keirs, Ayrshire
- Kirkbuddo, Angus ("Fort of Buiteoc")
- Kirkcaldy, Fife (Caercaledin; "place of the hard fort" or "place of Caled's fort")
- Kirkintilloch, Dunbartonshire. Formerly Caerpentaloch

== In fiction ==
- Caer Benowyc, Caer Berkstead, Caer Boldiam, Caer Caddug, Caer Diogel, Caer Erasleigh, Caer Gothwaite, Caer Hurbury, Caer Renaris, Caer Sidi, Caer Sursbrooke, Caer Ulfwych, and Caer Witrin from the video game Dark Age of Camelot
- Caer Bocram from the video game Tales of Vesperia
- Caer Bronach and Caer Oswin from video game Dragon Age: Inquisition
- Caer Cadarn from the novel series The Warlord Chronicles - set in Cadbury Castle, Somerset, according to the author's note in The Winter King.
- Caer Dallben from The Chronicles of Prydain novel series
- Caer Darrow from the video game World of Warcraft
- Caer Dhú from the novel The Sword of Rhiannon
- Caer Llyr and Caer Secaire from the novel The Dark World
- Caer Lyon from the video game Wizard101
- Caer Siorai from the video game Death's Gambit
- Caer Xhan from the video game Breath of Fire III
- Cair Paravel from the Chronicles of Narnia novel series
- Kaer Morhen and Kaer Trolde from The Witcher novel series
- Kaer Norvent from the video game Final Fantasy XVI
- Kêr-Is (Ys), of Breton legend
- Kerrith, town mentioned in the novel Rebecca, set in Cornwall
- The Rabbit of Caerbannog from the film Monty Python and the Holy Grail
- Caer-Konig & Caer Dineval from the Forgotten Realms campaign setting

== See also ==
- Gaer (disambiguation)
- Welsh toponymy
