= Gaer =

Gaer may refer to:

- Gaer, Newport, the electoral ward of Newport, South Wales
- Gaer (Black Mountains), hill in the Black Mountains of Wales
- Evdokia Gaer (1934–2019), Russian educator, politician and human rights activist
- Y Gaer, a Roman fort near the modern-day town of Brecon, Mid Wales

== See also ==
- Caer
