= Mediolanum (disambiguation) =

Mediolanum is the ancient name of Milan, Italy.

Mediolanum may also refer to:

== Ancient Celtic cities and towns ==
- Mediolanum Santonum, modern Saintes in France
- Mediolanum Aulercorum, modern Évreux, France
- Mediolanum (Whitchurch), England
- Another British site placed by Ptolemy in central Wales and sometimes identified with,
  - Meifod
  - Llanfyllin
  - Caersws

== Other uses ==
- Gruppo Mediolanum, an Italian financial services group based in Basiglio near Milan
- Banca Mediolanum, an Italian bank
- Mediolanum (train), a name used for international express trains connecting to Milan
- Mediolanum (company), an Italian financial services company that merged with Banca Mediolanum in 2015
- Mediolanum Group, the current parent company of Banca Mediolanum
