= Caersws =

Village in Powys, Wales

Caersws: Welsh: Caersŵs
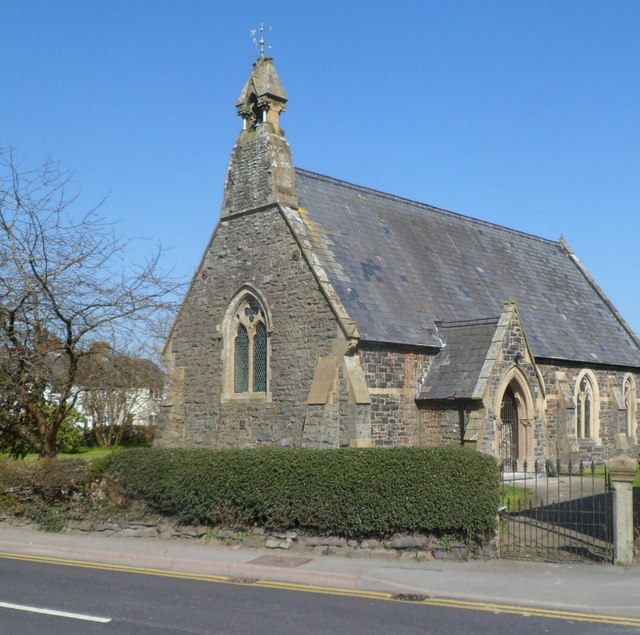
- The former village church

- Location within Powys
- Population: 1,586 (2011)
- OS grid reference: SO031919
- Community: Caersws
- Principal area: Powys
- Preserved county: Powys
- Country: Wales
- Sovereign state: United Kingdom
- Post town: CAERSWS
- Postcode district: SY17
- Dialling code: 01650
- Police: Dyfed-Powys
- Fire: Mid and West Wales
- Ambulance: Welsh
- UK Parliament: Montgomeryshire and Glyndŵr
- Senedd Cymru – Welsh Parliament: Montgomeryshire
- List of places UK Wales Powys 52.521458°N 3.422429°W Community map: Map of the community

Caersws (Welsh: Caersŵs; pronounced [kɑːɨrˈsuːs]) is a village and community on the River Severn, in the Welsh county of Powys; it was formerly in Montgomeryshire. It is located 5 miles (8 km) west of Newtown, halfway between Aberystwyth and Shrewsbury. At the 2011 census, the community had a population of 1,586 – a figure which includes the settlements of Clatter, Llanwnnog and Pontdolgoch; the village itself had a population of slightly over 800.

== Etymology ==
The name is derived from the Welsh placename elements "Caer-" and "Sŵs". "Caer" translates as "fort" and likely refers to the Roman settlement. The derivation of the second element is less certain.

Thomas Pennant and later writers note that the fort was the termination of the Roman Road from Chester (via Meifod), the name of the road was Sarn Swsan or Sarn Swsog and it is thought that the town and the road share their etymology. The meaning of Swsan/Swsog is again, uncertain, but two local traditions hold that this is a personal name, either of a mythological Queen Swswen a Celtic leader who is said to have fought a battle in the vicinity around the time of the Roman occupation or it is named for a Roman lieutenant "Hesus".

Other suggested etymologies focus on the fact that "sws" (not sŵs) can be literally translated to "Kiss" in modern Welsh or that the name may retain a Roman-era dedication to Zeus. The linguist John Rhys noted that the dialect of Mid-Wales Welsh (Powyseg) was closer to the Gaulish language than its neighbours, and concluded that the area had pre-Roman links to Gaul. This may suggest a link between Caersŵs and the God Esus venerated by the Parisii and Treverii.

== In Welsh mythology ==
In Welsh mythology, Caersws was the location of an ancient city built by Locrinus, the king of Lloegyr around the year 1086 BC (22 years after the construction of London). In the legend, Caersws is built and named for Queen Swswen ("The Blessed/Pure Kiss").

A version of the legend is recorded by Oliver Mathews in 1616. In Mathews' version, Locrinus won a fierce battle against Humber the Hun, who invaded Britain following the death of Locrinus' father Brutus of Troy. After defeating the invaders, Locrinus discovered the beautiful Princess Swswen inside one of Humber's ships and fell in love with her. However, Locrinus was already betrothed to Gwendolen, a daughter of King Corineus of Cornwall. While Locrinus honoured this commitment and made Gwendolen his queen, he conducted a secret affair with Swswen, and constructed a new city for her in Cambria, that was named Caersws in her honour.

Some years later, King Corineus had died and Locrinus decided to divorce Queen Gwendolen and marry Swswen, living together in Caersws as King and Queen with their illegitimate daughter, Hafren. Outraged by this slight, Gwendolen raised an army in Cornwall and killed Locrinus in battle. She then ordered that the ancient city of Caersws be razed to the ground, killing both Queen Swswen and her daughter in the process. The victorious Queen then had both bodies cast into the river that passes by Caersws, which the Britons named "Hafren" in honour of the innocent Princess. The Swswen legend is also reported by Edward Lhuyd, who claimed to have seen an ancient manuscript that detailed Locrinus' building of the ancient city of Caersŵs and which names Sŵs-wên as the wife of Humber the Hun rather than a captive.

== History ==
Caersws was the location of two Roman forts of Roman Wales. Although the Mediolanum of the Antonine Itinerary has since been identified as Whitchurch in Shropshire, Caersws is sometimes identified as the Mediolanum among the Ordovices described in Ptolemy's Geography, although others argue for Llanfyllin or Meifod. Further, this second Mediolanum may be identical or distinct from the "Mediomanum" (lit. "Central Hand") mentioned by the Ravenna Cosmography.

== Governance ==
An electoral ward in the same name exists. This ward includes the community of Carno and, at the 2011 Census, had a population of 2,316.

== Buildings ==
The Church of St Gwynog dates from the 15th century and was restored in 1863. It contains a 15th century rood screen and loft which the Royal Commission on the Ancient and Historical Monuments of Wales describes as "exceptional; the best-preserved of thirty known to have existed in the county".

Maesmawr Hall, to the south-east of the village, was built in the early 19th century and is a Grade II* listed building.

== Transport ==
Caersws railway station is a stop on the Cambrian Line. Transport for Wales operates services between Aberystwyth/Pwllheli, Shrewsbury and Birmingham International.

== Sport ==
Downhill mountain biking has flourished in forestry at Henblas farm, to the north of the village, with a number of national races being held there. The current series, The Caersws Cup, began in March 2009.

Cymru Alliance club Caersws F.C. are based in the village and play their home matches at the Recreation Ground.

Caersws is home to current and past champions of a number of sporting disciplines, leading some to christen it the "Sporting Capital of Wales".

== Notable people ==
- John Ceiriog Hughes (1832–1887), a Welsh poet and collector of Welsh folk tunes; also stationmaster and manager of the Van Railway from 1868 to 1887; buried in the churchyard at Llanwnnog.
- Mart Watkins (1880–1942), footballer with 161 club caps and 10 for Wales.
- Derek A. Traversi (1912–2005), a literary critic mainly for the British Council
- Phil Woosnam (1932–2013), former NASL commissioner and footballer with over 370 club caps and 17 for Wales.

== Gallery ==
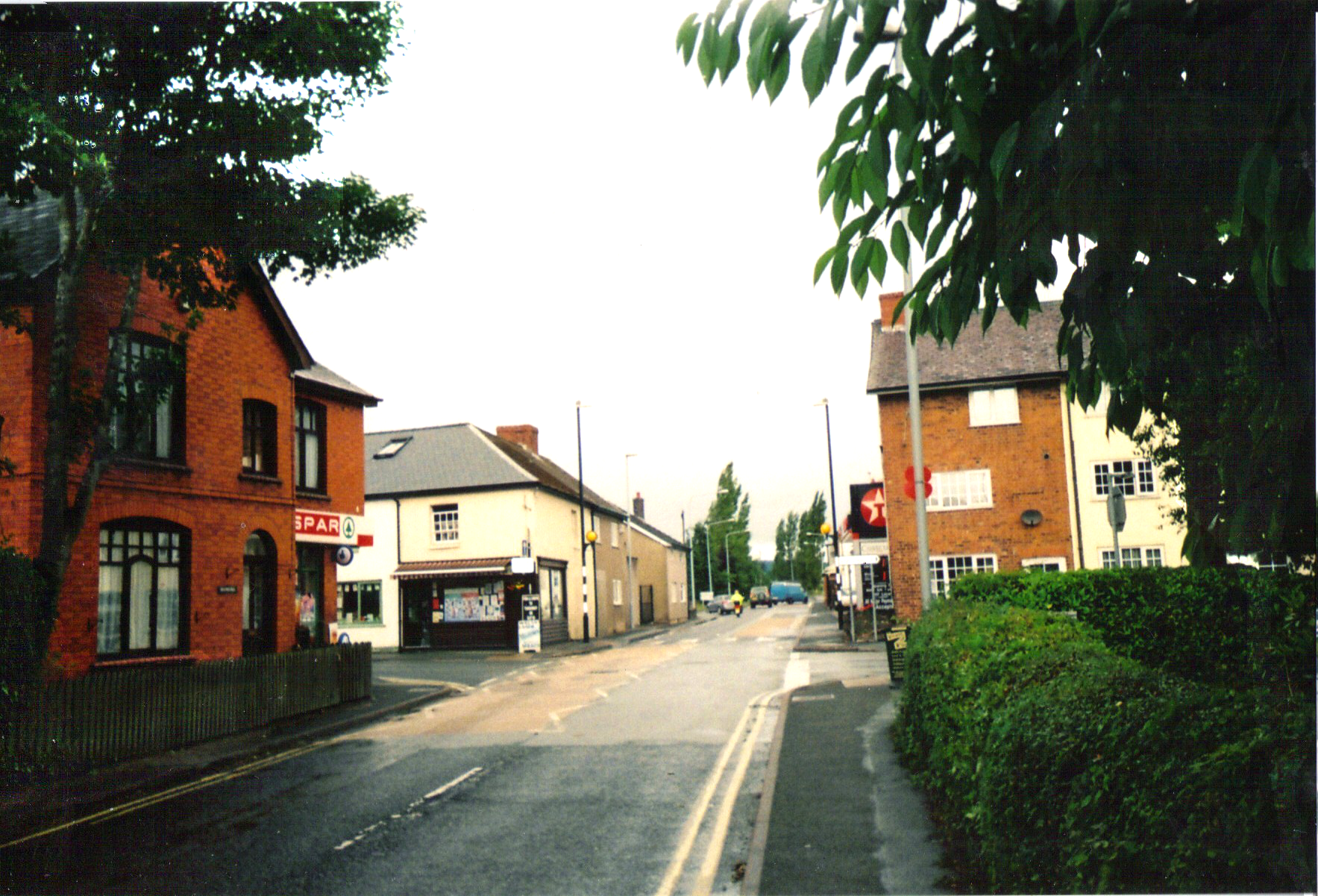
The village centre, complete with Texaco garage and Spar shop in 2010.

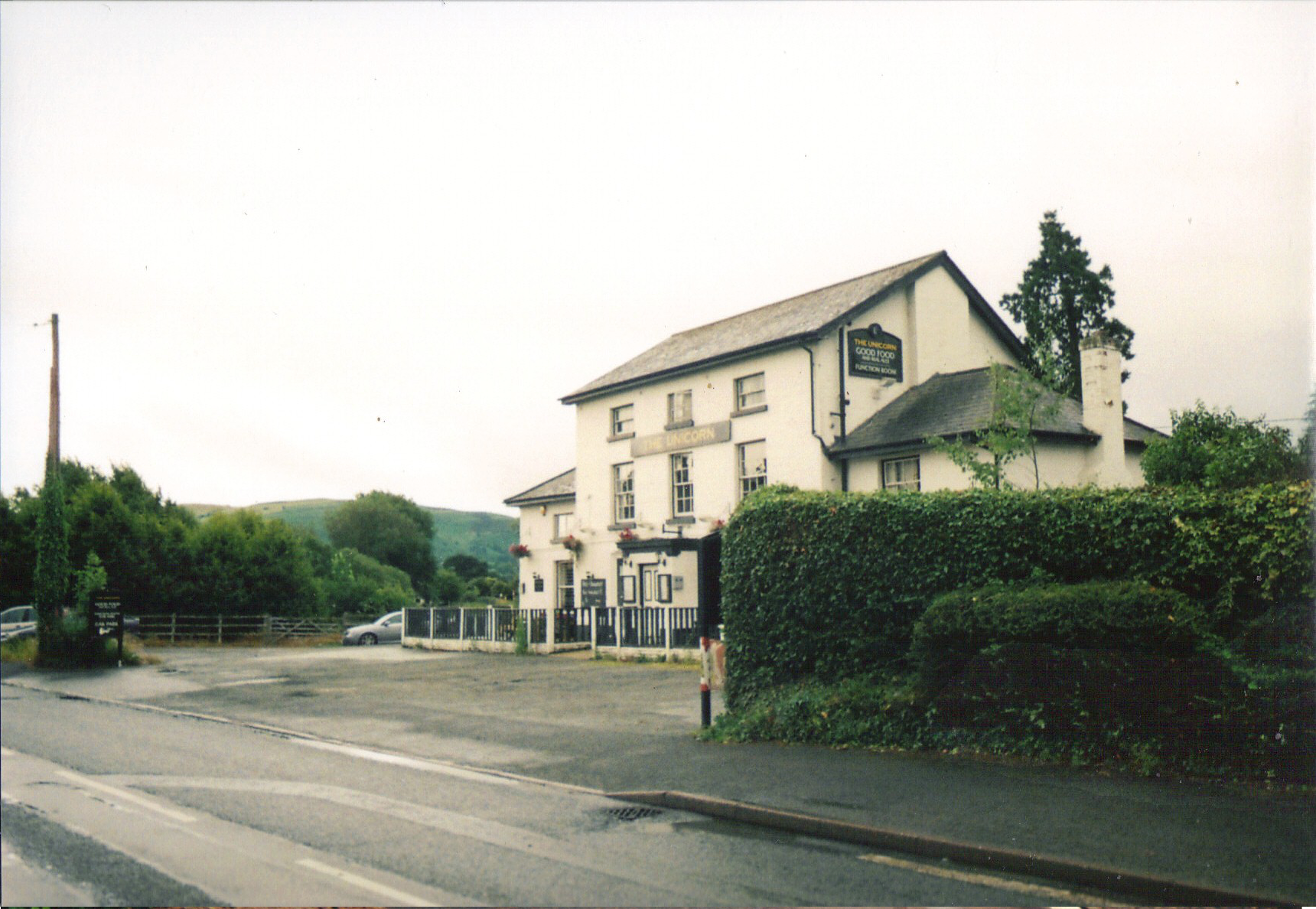
One of Caersws’ four local pubs in 2010.

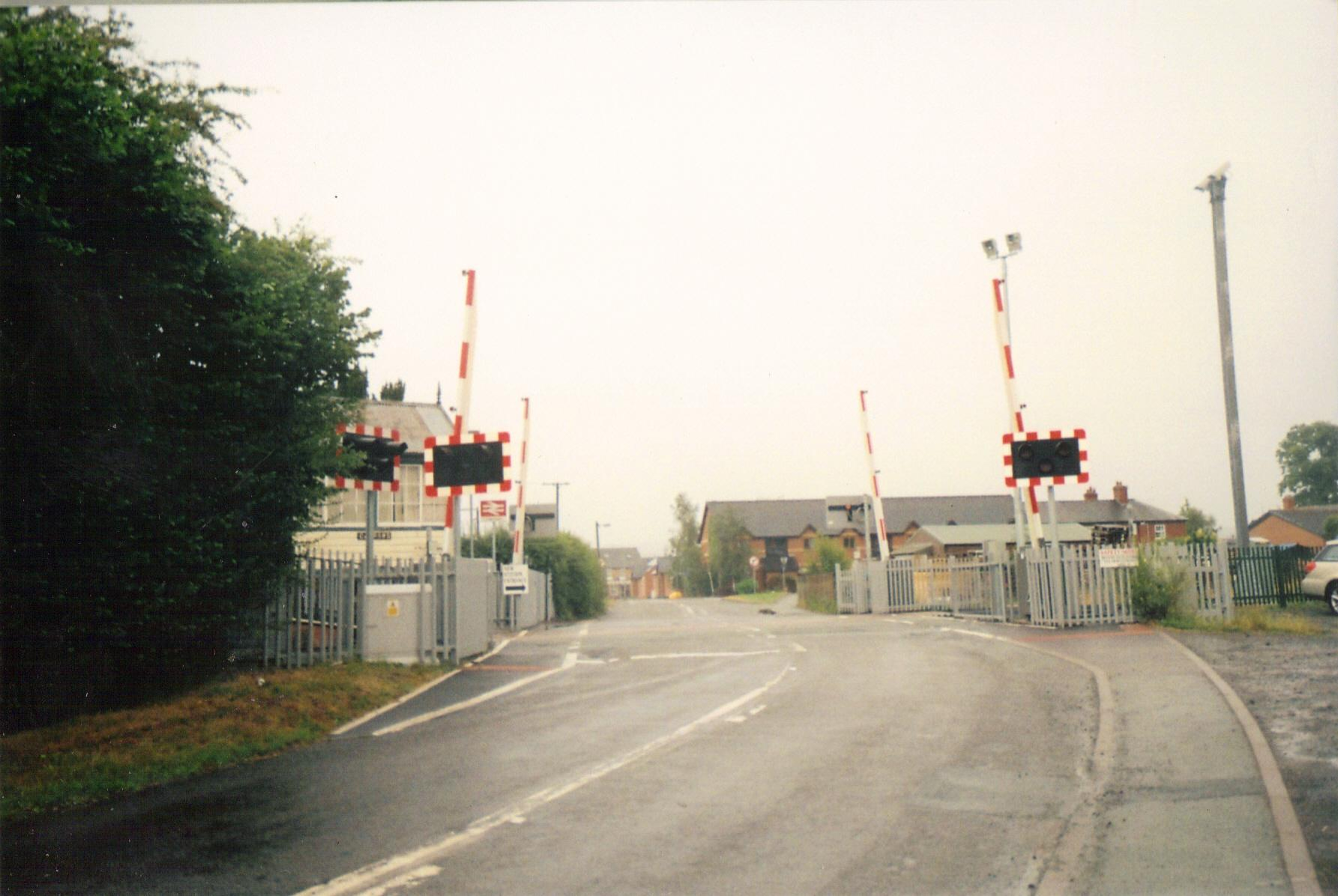
The in town level crossing by Caersws station in 2010.

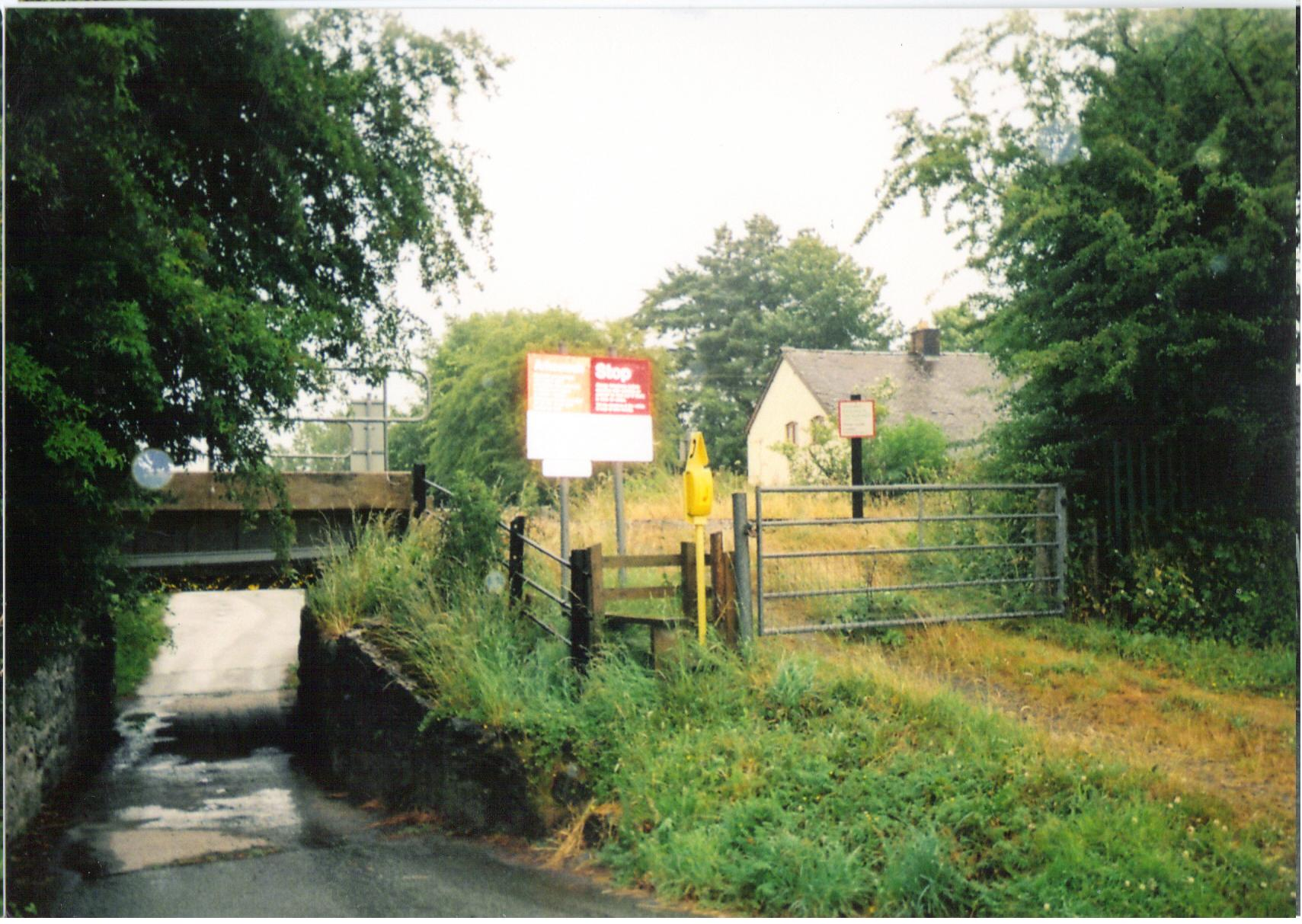
A gated village Barrow Crossing/foot crossing in Caersws in 2010.

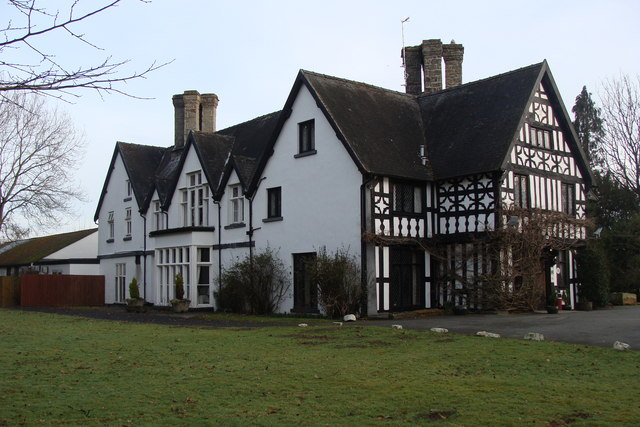
Maesmawr Hall, a grade II* listed building

== See also ==
- Welsh Marches

== Literature ==
- Stephenson D. (2014), The Medieval Borough of Caersws: Origins and Decline, The Montgomeryshire Collections, Vol. 102, 103–109.
