= Constantin (disambiguation) =

Constantin may refer to:

- Constantin, human name that may be either a surname or given name
- Constantin Film, film company

== See also ==
- Constantine (disambiguation)
