= Caersws Roman Forts =

Roman fortifications in Powys, Wales

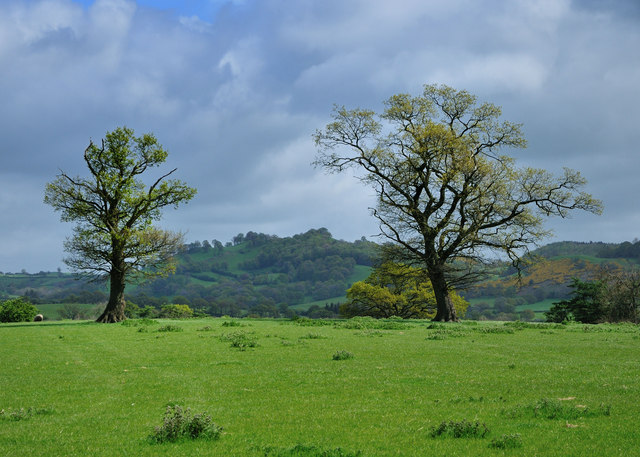
Site of the campaign fort east of Caersws

The Caersws Roman Forts are two Roman military camps (Latin: castra) at Caersws, Powys in Mid Wales. They were garrisoned during the occupation of Great Britain between the 1st and 5th centuries when this part of Wales was part of the Roman province of Britannia Superior. A surviving section of Roman road lies to the west of the encampments.

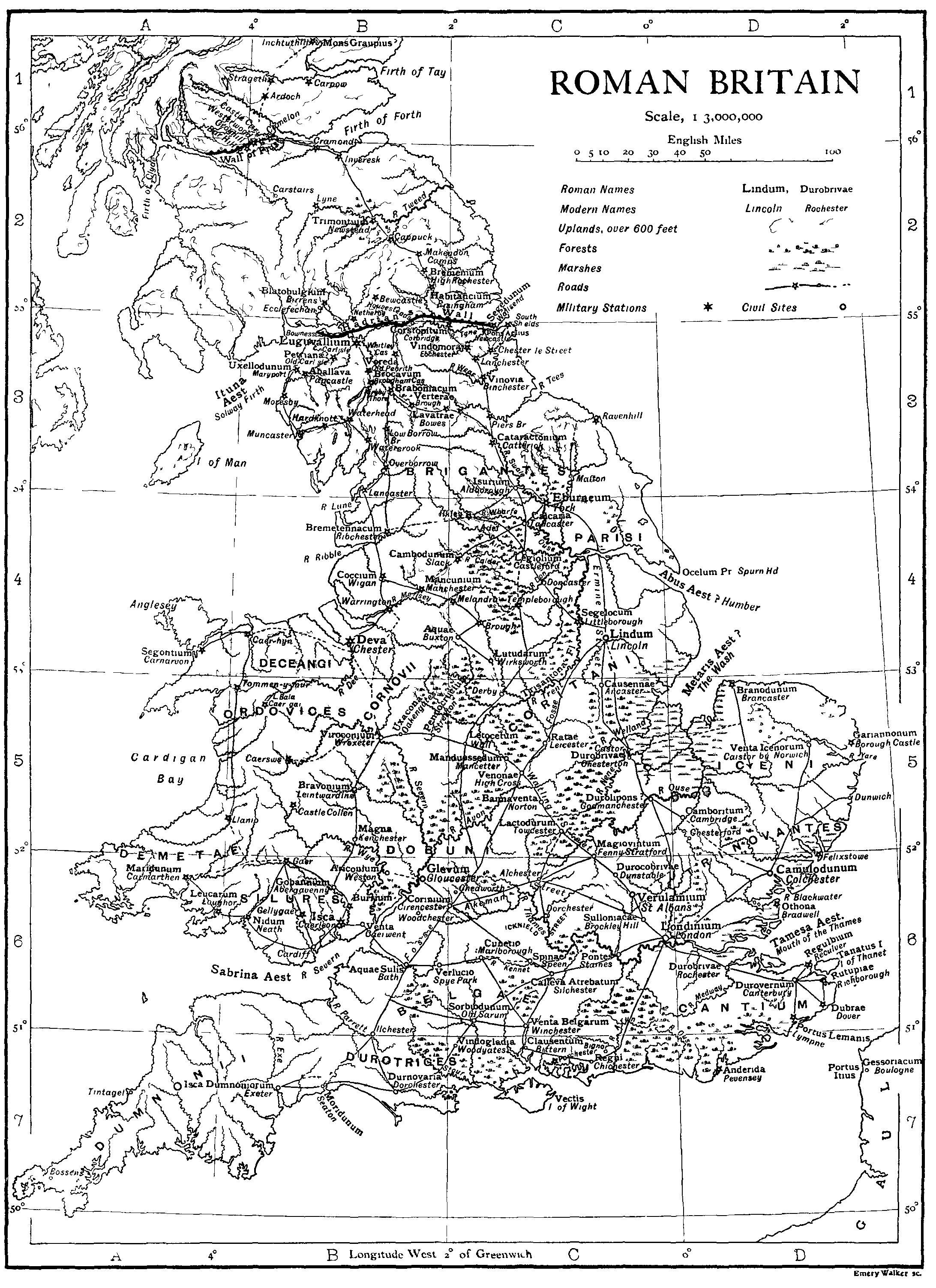
The map of Roman Britain in the 1911 Encyclopædia Britannica, displaying Caersws.

== Toponym ==
The original Latin names of these encampments are unknown, although their placement has led to tentative identification with the "Mediolanum" among the Ordovices described in Ptolemy's Geography and the "Mediomanum" of the Ravenna Cosmography. Mediomanum is an unusual and otherwise unattested name (literally "Central Hand"), suggesting it may be a scribal error. Others argue for identification of these sites with Llanfyllin or Meifod, while some propose that both sites are identical with the Mediolanum of the Antonine Itinerary, which has been firmly identified with Whitchurch in Shropshire.

If Caersws were the location of Ptolemy's Mediolanum, it might be identical with the Cair Meguaid listed by among the 28 cities of Britain in the History of the Britons, although this is more often identified with the Powysian court at Meifod.

== First camp ==
During the Roman conquest of Britain, the Roman military built a campaign fort here between 43 and 84 CE. It was located in a bend of the River Severn at Llwyn-y-Brain, 0.75 mi (1.21 km) east of the present-day village of Caersws (located at 52.522221°N 3.411324°W). The fort, which was much larger than other campaign forts of this type, was built of earth and timber. Three parallel lines of surviving defence (ditches) have been identified with an entrance way in the centre with an outer earthwork.

== Second camp ==
Around 78CE, as the conquest of Roman Wales was consolidated, the campaign camp was replaced by a permanent square fort for Roman auxiliary troops (located at 52.5162°N 3.4329°W). The fort, which was built closer to the confluence of the Rivers Carno and Severn, is now beneath the present-day village of Caersws. Although smaller than the campaign fort, it had a bank and triple ditch enclosing 7.75 acres (3.14 ha). Around 200CE, its headquarters building and walls were rebuilt in stone. There was a military bath house and a civilian vicus. Occupation lasted into the early 4th century.

== See also ==
- Wales in the Roman Era
- History of Wales

== Notes ==
Citations

Bibliography

- White, Kevan W (2021). "Mediomanum?: Large Roman Fort & Minor Romano-British Settlement". Roman-Britain.co.uk.
