= Clatter, Powys =

Village in Powys, Wales

Coordinates: 52.54215°N 3.47679°W

Clatter
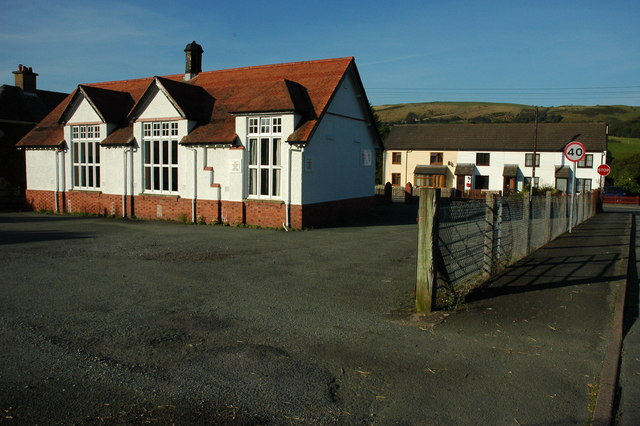
- Village Hall, Clatter

- Location within Powys
- OS grid reference: SN999948
- Principal area: Powys
- Preserved county: Powys
- Country: Wales
- Sovereign state: United Kingdom
- Post town: CAERSWS
- Postcode district: SY17
- Dialling code: 01686
- Police: Dyfed-Powys
- Fire: Mid and West Wales
- Ambulance: Welsh
- UK Parliament: Montgomeryshire and Glyndŵr
- Senedd Cymru – Welsh Parliament: Montgomeryshire

Clatter is a small village in Powys, Wales, located in the community of Caersws on the main A470 road between Carno and Caersws village.

Because of its proximity to Caersws, the area has ancient origins, sitting near the site of significant Roman military forts, such as Mediomanum.

The area was heavily impacted by the economic hardships of the 19th-century, which culminated in the Rebecca Riots. During this time, rural Welsh farmers and agrarians protested against what they perceived as unfair and corrupt taxation.
