= Derek A. Traversi =

British literary critic

Derek Aimone Uberto Antona-Traversi (7 November 1912 – 25 August 2005) was a British literary critic who spent much of his life abroad employed by the British Council and then at United States universities. His literary criticism ranged from the Renaissance to Modernist poetry, but he specialized in Shakespeare studies. His most famous work is probably An Approach to Shakespeare first published in 1938.

== Biography ==
=== Early life and education ===
Traversi was born in 1912 in Caersws in central Wales. His mother was the daughter of a Welsh doctor from Monmouthshire, and his father was a landed northern Italian gentleman. He spent his early years in Italy until the rise of fascism there compelled the family to return to the United Kingdom. Traversi was educated at Alleyn's School and Merton College, Oxford, where he earned his M.A. (1934) and B.Litt. (1937). At University College, London, he earned a B.A. with first class honors in Italian (1938).

=== Career ===
Uninterested in joining the common room of a British university, in 1939 Traversi took a position at the British Institute in Rome. While there he was arrested for disrespect to Mussolini. On the commencement of war, he returned to the UK, taking one of the last boats from France.

Physically unfit for military service, Traversi instead was sent to the British Institute of Madrid where he forged a bond with the director and fellow Catholic Walter Starkie. It was during his stay in Spain that Traversi began submitting articles for the Catholic journals The Month, The Dublin Review and Blackfriars. The British government purposely sent British intellectuals, particularly Catholics, with the view to help keep Falangist-Spain neutral despite the propaganda dominance of Germany. Traversi had frequent close encounters with the Guardia Civil owing to his tendency to wander into officially prohibited areas. In 1943 Traversi set up the Barcelona branch of the British Institute, on Passeig de Gràcia, where he organized musical evenings, cocktail parties and conferences, for intellectuals and cultural figures like Carles Riba, Margot Fonteyn and Joan-Antoni Maragall i Noble.

From 1970 to 1980, Traversi was a professor of English literature at Swarthmore College.

== Publications ==
=== Dissertation ===
- "Devotional Prose Written on the Continent during the Reign of Elizabeth," B.Litt., University of Oxford, 1937.

=== Articles ===
- "The Progress of Piers Plowman". Scrutiny. 5 (3): 276–291. December 1936.
- "Coriolanus". Scrutiny. 6 (1): 43–58. June 1937.
- "Dostoievsky". The Criterion. XVI (65): 585–602. July 1937.
- "The Novels of E.M. Forster". The Arena. 1: 28–40. 1937.
- "Shakespeare's Last Plays by E.M.W. Tillyard". Scrutiny. 6 (4): 446–49. March 1938.
- "The Writings of E.M. Forster". The Month. 172 (893): 428ff. November 1938.
- "Troilus and Cressida". Scrutiny. 7 (3): 301–19. December 1938.
- Antona-Traversi, D. (1938). "Observations on Dante's Canzione: 'Io son Venuto al punto de la rota'". Italian Studies. 2 (6): 65–72. doi:10.1179/007516338790589982.
- "Giovanni Papini and Italian Literature". Scrutiny. 7 (3): 415–25. March 1939.
- "The Conversion of Alessandro Manzoni". The Month. 174 (903): 250ff. September 1939.
- "The Significance of Manzoni's 'Promessi Sposi,'". Scrutiny. 9 (2): 131–48. September 1940.
- "Review: The Statecraft of Machiavelli by Herbert Butterfield". Scrutiny. 9 (2): 186–93. September 1940.
- "Henry the Fifth". Scrutiny. 9 (4): 352–74. March 1941.
- "Review: Giangaleazzo Visconti, Duke of Milan (1351-1402)". Blackfriars. 22 (255): 321–22.
- "D'Annunzio and Modern Italy". The Dublin Review. 209 (419): 140ff. October 1941.
- "The Development of Modern Italian Poetry (I)". Scrutiny. 10 (2): 143–56. October 1941.
- "Catholicism and the New Order in Italy". Blackfriars. 22 (259): 527–42. October 1941.
- "'Measure for Measure'". Scrutiny. 11 (1): 40–59. Summer 1942.
- "Henry IV—Part I". Scrutiny. 15 (1): 24–35. December 1947.
- "Henry IV—Part II". Scrutiny. 15 (2): 117–127. Spring 1948.
- "'The Waste Land' Revisited". The Dublin Review. 221 (443): 106ff. April 1948.
- "'Wuthering Heights' after a Hundred Years". The Dublin Review. 223 (445): 154ff. Spring 1949.
- "'The Tempest'". Scrutiny. 16 (2): 127–57. June 1949.
- "Review: King Lear". The Month. 2 (6): 425ff. December 1949.
- "Academic Criticism Today: Shakespeare's Problem Plays and English Drama from Early Times to the Elizabethans". Scrutiny. 17 (2): 181–84. Summer 1950.
- "Graham Greene: I. The Earlier Novels". Twentieth Century. 149: 231ff. 1951.
- "Graham Greene: II. The Later Novels". Twentieth Century. 149: 318ff. 1951.
- "'Macbeth'". Revista Javeriana. 34: 269ff. July 1950.
- "'King Lear' (I)". Scrutiny. 19 (1): 43–64. October 1952.
- "'King Lear'(II)". Scrutiny. 19 (2): 126–42. Winter 1952–53.
- "'King Lear' (III)". Scrutiny. 19 (3): 206–230. Spring 1953.
- "Dr. Leavis and the Case of D.H. Lawrence". The Month. 15 (3): 166ff. March 1956.
- "Keats's Letters and Romantic Poetry". The Month. 17 (6). June 1957.
- "Review: The Poetry of Pablo Neruda". New Universities Quarterly. 31 (3): 378. Summer 1977.

=== Books ===
- An Approach to Shakespeare. London: The Paladin Press. 1938.
- Shakespeare: The Last Phase. London: Hollis & Carter. 1954. Shakespeare: The Last Phase. New York: Harcourt, Brace. 1955. LCCN 55006076/L.
- Shakespeare, from Richard II to Henry V. Stanford, Calif.: Stanford University Press. 1957. LCCN 57011673.
- Shakespeare: The Early Comedies. London: For the British Council and The National Book League by Longmans, Green. 1960.
- Shakespeare: The Roman Plays. Stanford, Calif.: Stanford University Press. 1963. LCCN 63015213.
- T. S. Eliot: The Longer Poems: The Waste land, Ash Wednesday, Four Quartets. New York: Harcourt Brace Jovanovich. 1976. ISBN 0151913803.
- Introduction to Renaissance Drama. New York: St. Martin's Press. 1980. ISBN 0312347022.
- The Literary Imagination: Studies in Dante, Chaucer, and Shakespeare. Newark / London: University of Delaware Press / Associated University Presses. 1982. ISBN 0874131987.
- Chaucer: The Earlier Poetry: A Study in Poetic Development. Newark: University of Delaware Pres. 1987. ISBN 0874133068.
