= Maesmawr Hall =

Historic building in Wales

Maesmawr

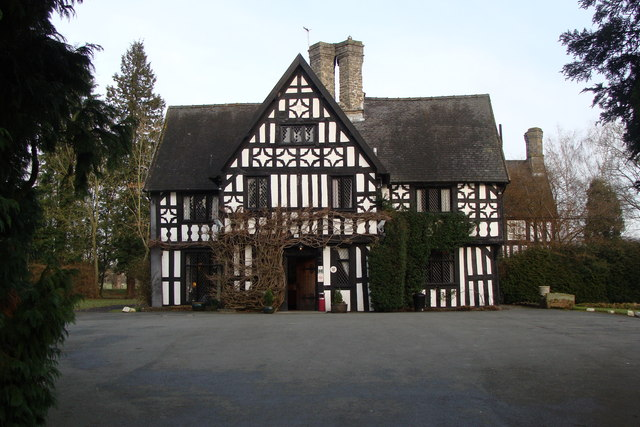

- Location in Montgomeryshire
- 52.5163°N 3.4142°W
- Location: Llandinam, Montgomeryshire, Wales
- OS grid reference: SO0404691916

History
- Built: late 17th-, early-18th century

Site notes
- Architectural style: Timber framed Lobby Entrance Severn Valley House
- Restored: 1873–5
- Restored by: William Eden Nesfield

Listed Building – Grade II*
- Designated: 3 October 1953
- Reference no.: 7572

Maesmawr Hall is a historic timber-framed house, situated to the southeast of Caersws, in the historic county of Montgomeryshire, which now forms part of Powys in Wales. It is currently run as a hotel. A long avenue approaches the front of the property from the south.

== History ==
The area around Maesmawr was occupied during Roman times. Due to its location near the banks of the River Severn, the Romans built a road through the area. A Welsh Long House was once located in the grounds.

The hall has the date 1535 painted at the top of the gable over the porch, but this date is likely to be a fairly recent overpainting of the date, which was previously 1717. While the date of construction of Maes Mawr is uncertain, on stylistic grounds it is likely to be either late 17th century or early 18th century. In the early 19th century, it became a notable sporting estate for shooting game. In the 1870s, it was known to have been owned by John Pryce Davies and was owned for many years by his family, and by the Davies sisters in the 1900s. In August 2008, the hall was purchased by John Garner and Nigel Humphryson.

== Hotel ==
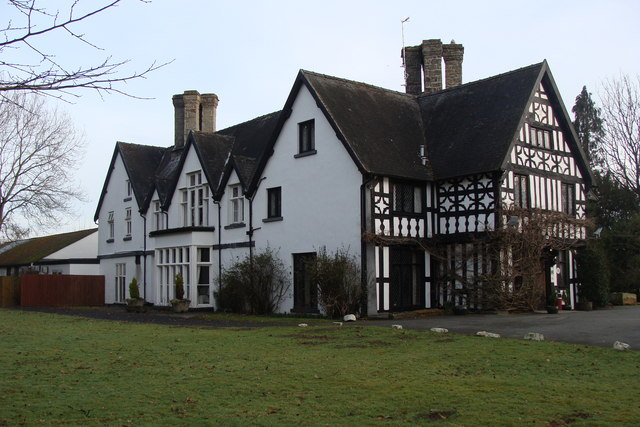
West wing added by William Eden Nesfield

Today the hall is used as a hotel with 20 bedrooms and is often hired for wedding receptions, proms and social evenings. The original rooms from the 1535 building have the original beams and uneven floors. In the Victorian period, a wing was added to the hall; those rooms are larger and brighter.

== Reputed haunting ==
The hall has featured in the TV series Most Haunted with reports of paranormal activity.

== See also ==
- Cilthriew, Kerry (Montgomeryshire)
- Ty Mawr, Castle Caereinion
- Penarth (Newtown and Llanllwchaiarn)
- Glas Hirfryn, Llansilin

== Literature ==
- Pryce T E, Half Timbered Houses of Montgomeryshire, Montgomeryshire Collections XVII. 1884 pp 152–157;
- Smith P, and Owen, C E . Traditional and Renaissance Elements in some late Stuart and early Georgian Half-Timbered Houses in Arwystli Montgomeryshire Collections LV-LVI. 1957–60, pp 101–124. Plan at Fig. 4;
- Smith P, Houses of the Welsh Countryside 1975, p 230 and Maps 10, 19, 30, 33, and 39;
- Scourfield R and Haslam R, (2013) Buildings of Wales: Powys; Montgomeryshire, Radnorshire and Breconshire, 2nd edition, Yale University Press pp 92–3.

== Maes Mawr Gallery ==
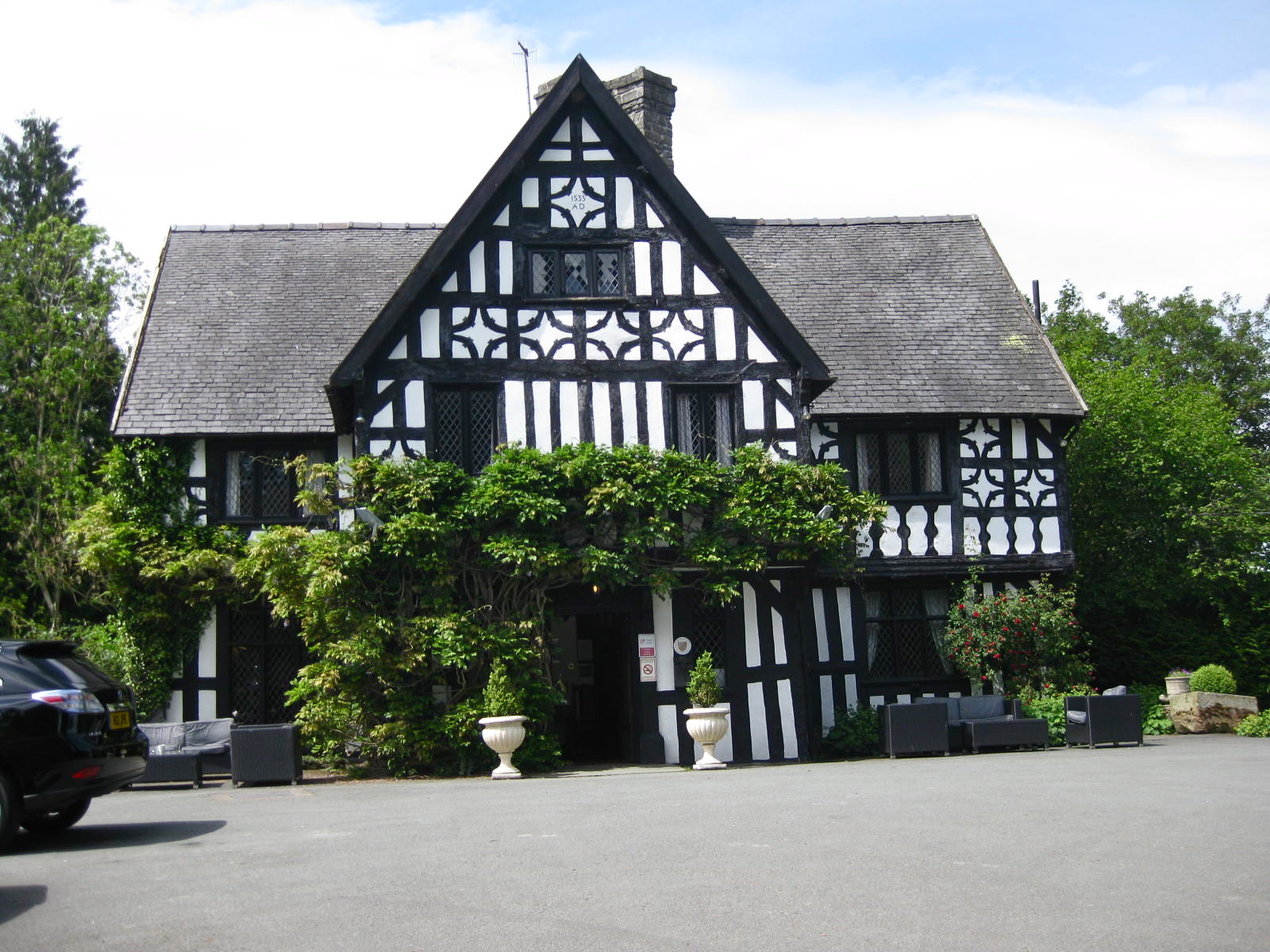
Maes Mawr, South front showing original house

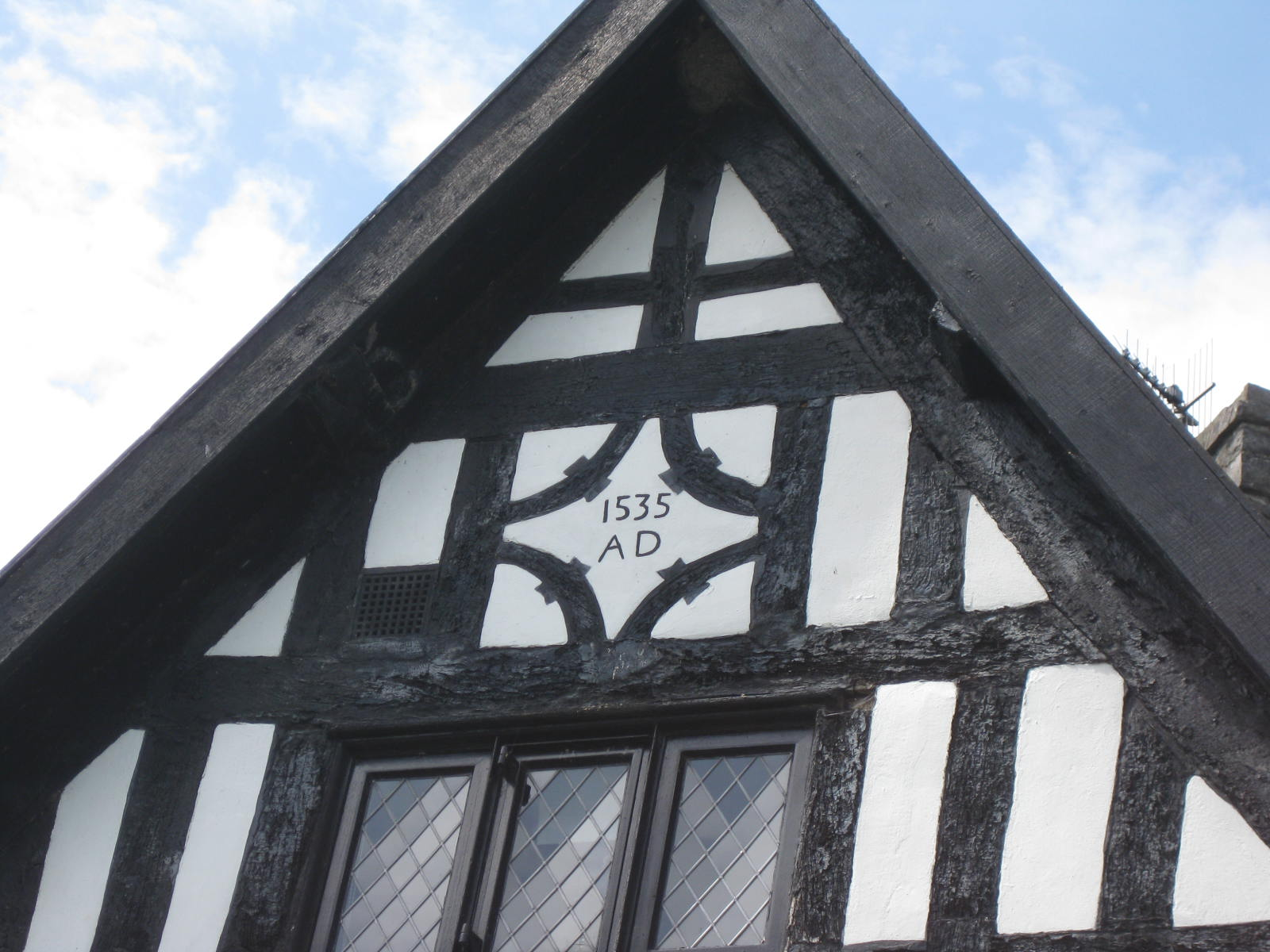
Maes Mawr, Date over porch which has been changed from 1717 to 1535

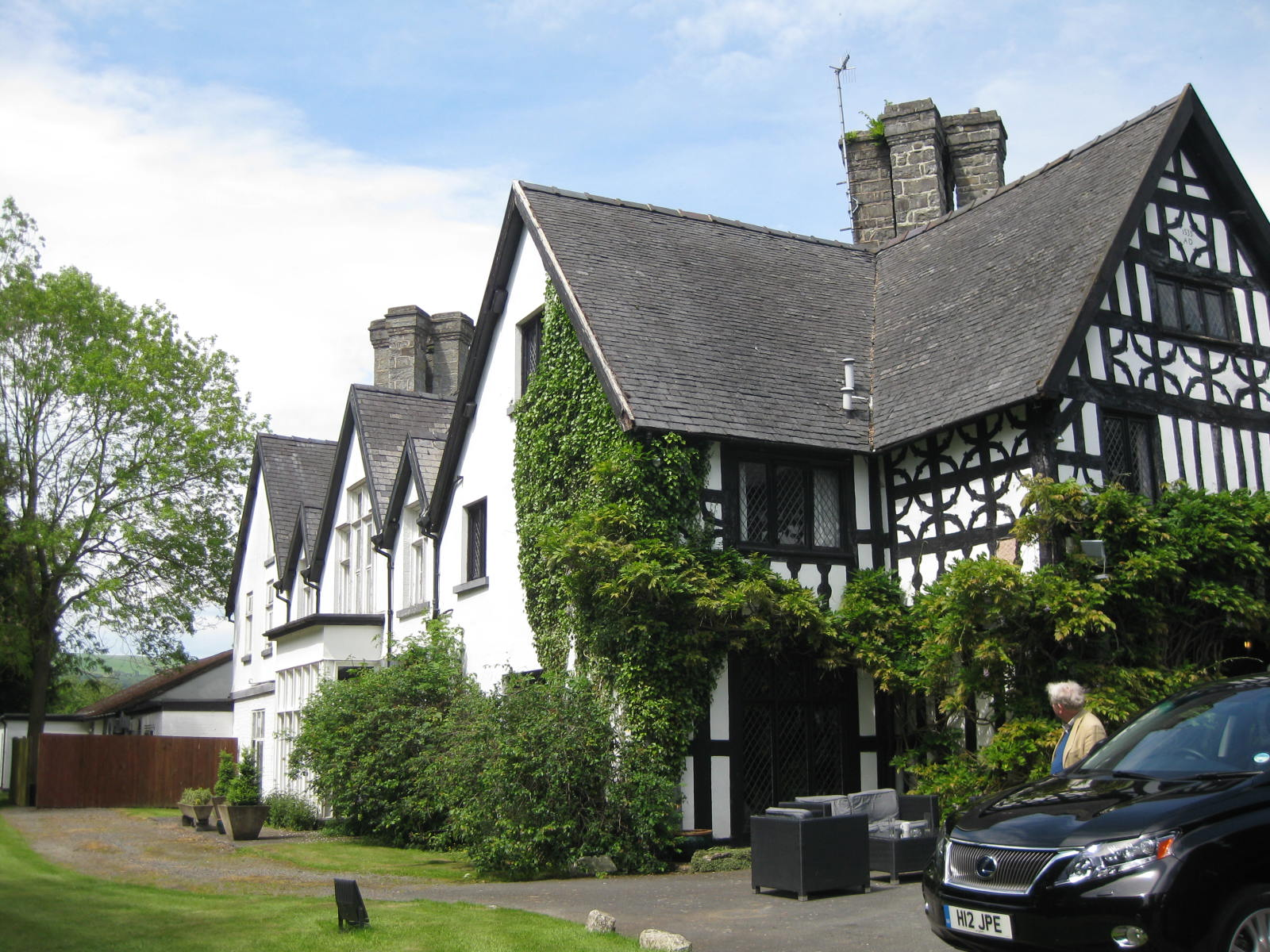
Maes Mawr, West wing by W Eden Nesfield, with Dining Room bay window.

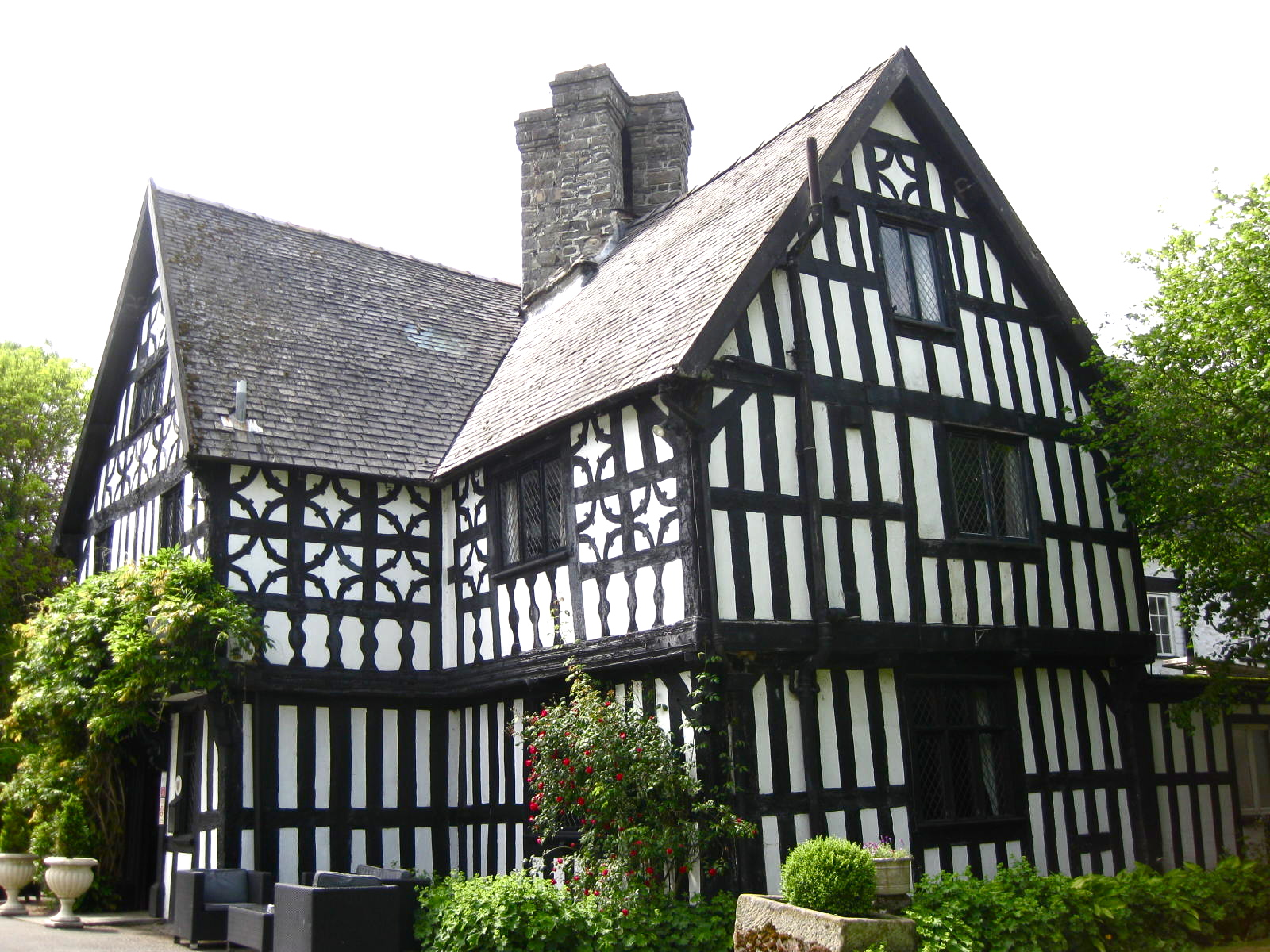
Maes Mawr, East gable and porch- jettied upper storey and quatrefoil decoration.

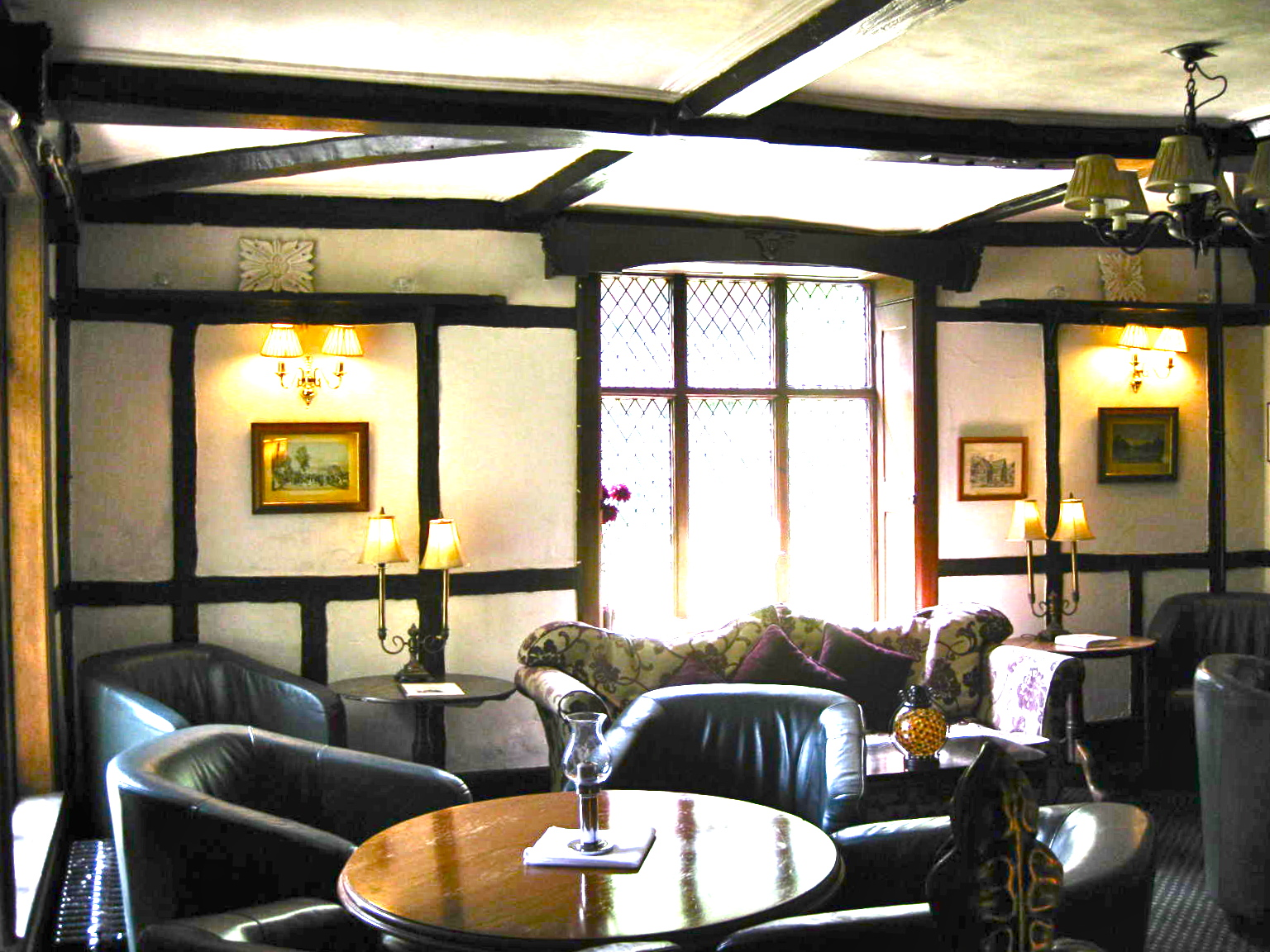
Maes Mawr, Interior ceiling with corner dragon beam.

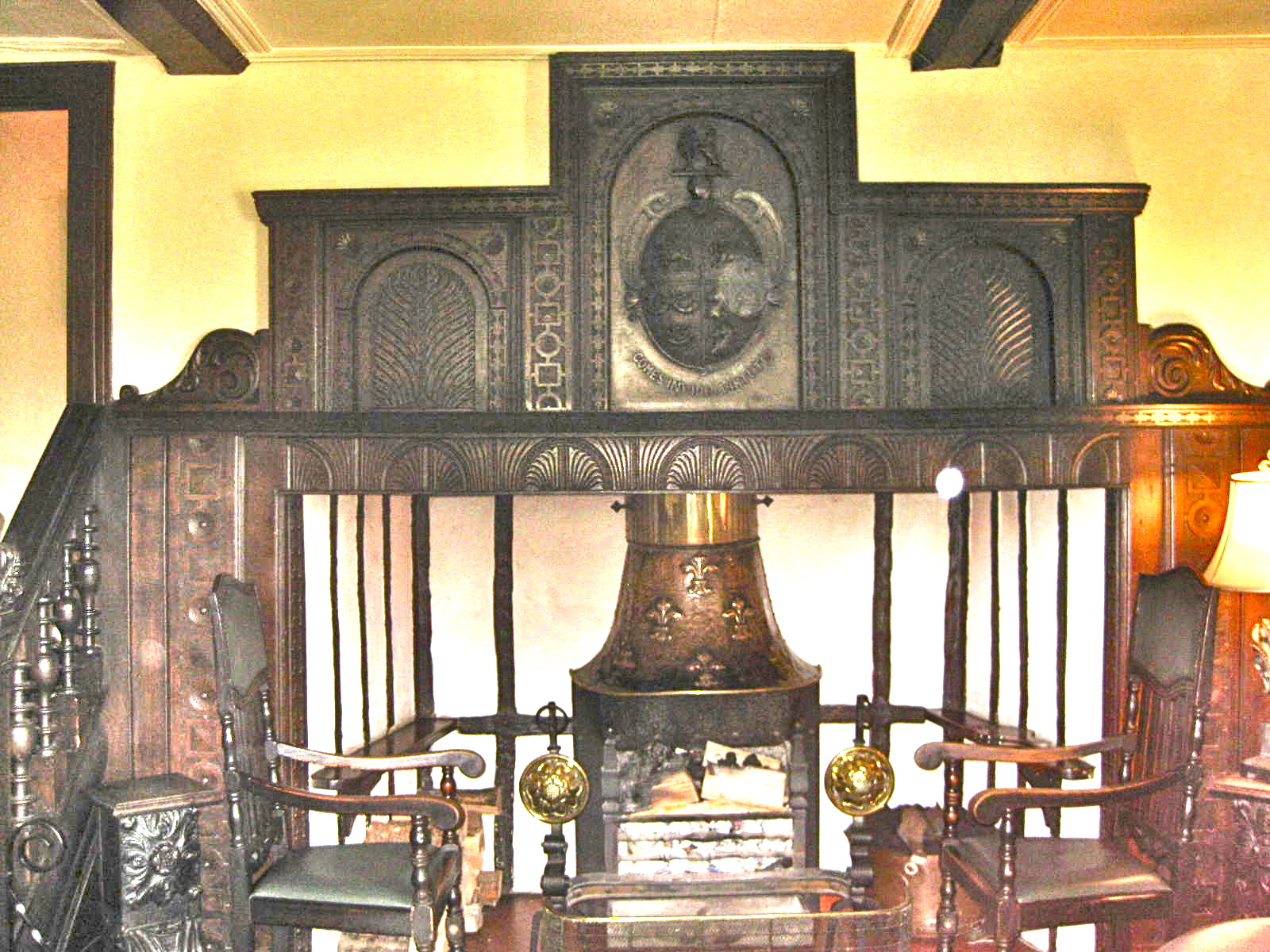
Maes Mawr, Arts and Crafts fireplace by Eden Nesfield

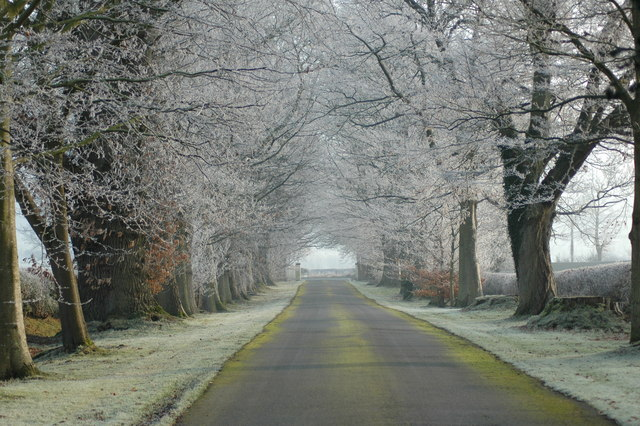
Maes Mawr Hall - Drive with beech avenue.

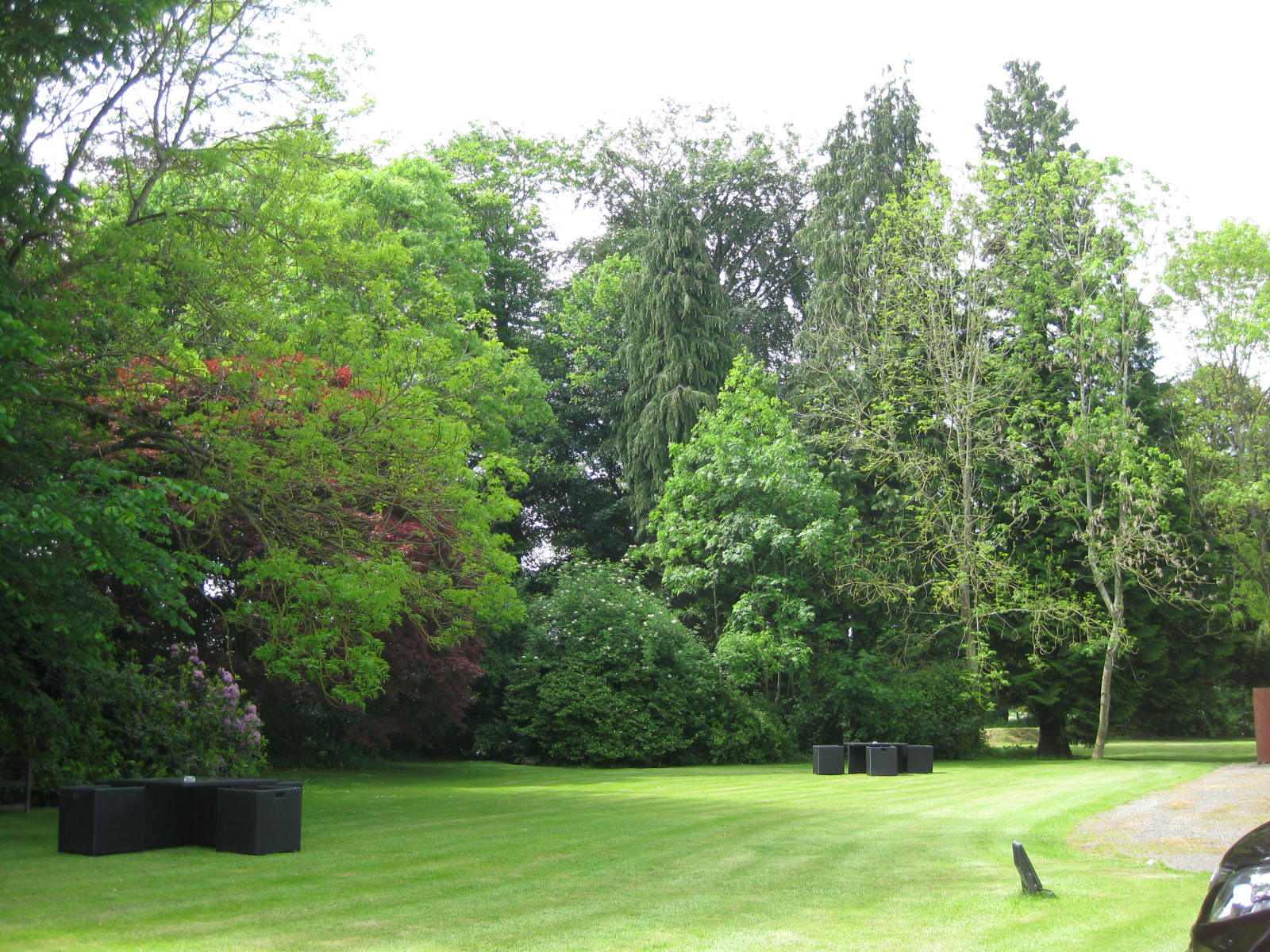
Maes Mawr, Specimen trees in garden.

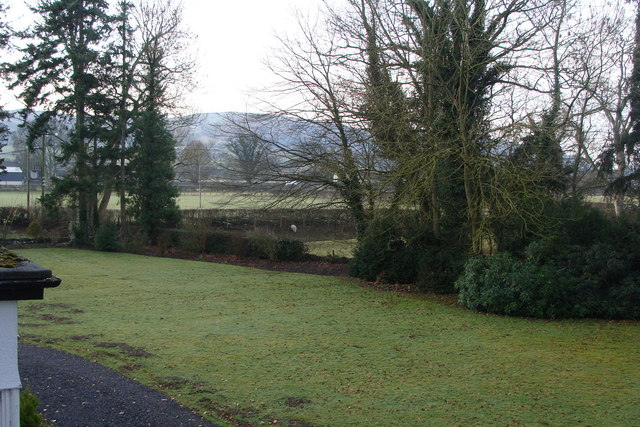
Maes Mawr Grounds
