= Constantius =

Constantius may refer to:

== Roman people ==
- Constantius I "Chlorus" (c. 250–306), Western Roman emperor from 305 to 306
- Julius Constantius (died 337), consul in 335, son of Constantius I
- Constantius Gallus (325–354), caesar from 351 to 354 and consul from 352 to 354, son of Julius Constantius
- Constantius II (317–361), emperor from 337 to 361, grandon of Constantius I
- Constantius III, Western Roman emperor in 421
- Constantius Ducas, Eastern/Byzantine co-emperor from 1060 to 1078

== Religious figures ==
- Saints Simplicius, Constantius and Victorinus (died c. 159), Christian martyrs
- Saint Constantius of Perugia (died c. 170), one of the patron saints of Perugia, Italy
- Saint Constantius (Theban Legion) (c. 3rd century), a member of the legendary Theban Legion
- Constantius of Lyon (fl. c. 480), cleric who wrote the Vita Germani, a hagiography
- Saint Constantius of Aquino, 6th century bishop of Aquino
- Saint Constantius of Capri (died 7th or 8th century), Bishop of Capri

== Other ==
- Constantius Africanus, (c. 1020 – 1085), translator of Greek and Islamic medical texts

== See also ==
- Constantine Constantius, a pseudonym of Søren Kierkegaard
- Constantine (disambiguation)
