= Gaer (Black Mountains) =

Hill in the Black Mountains of Wales

Coordinates: 51.8916°N 3.0280°W

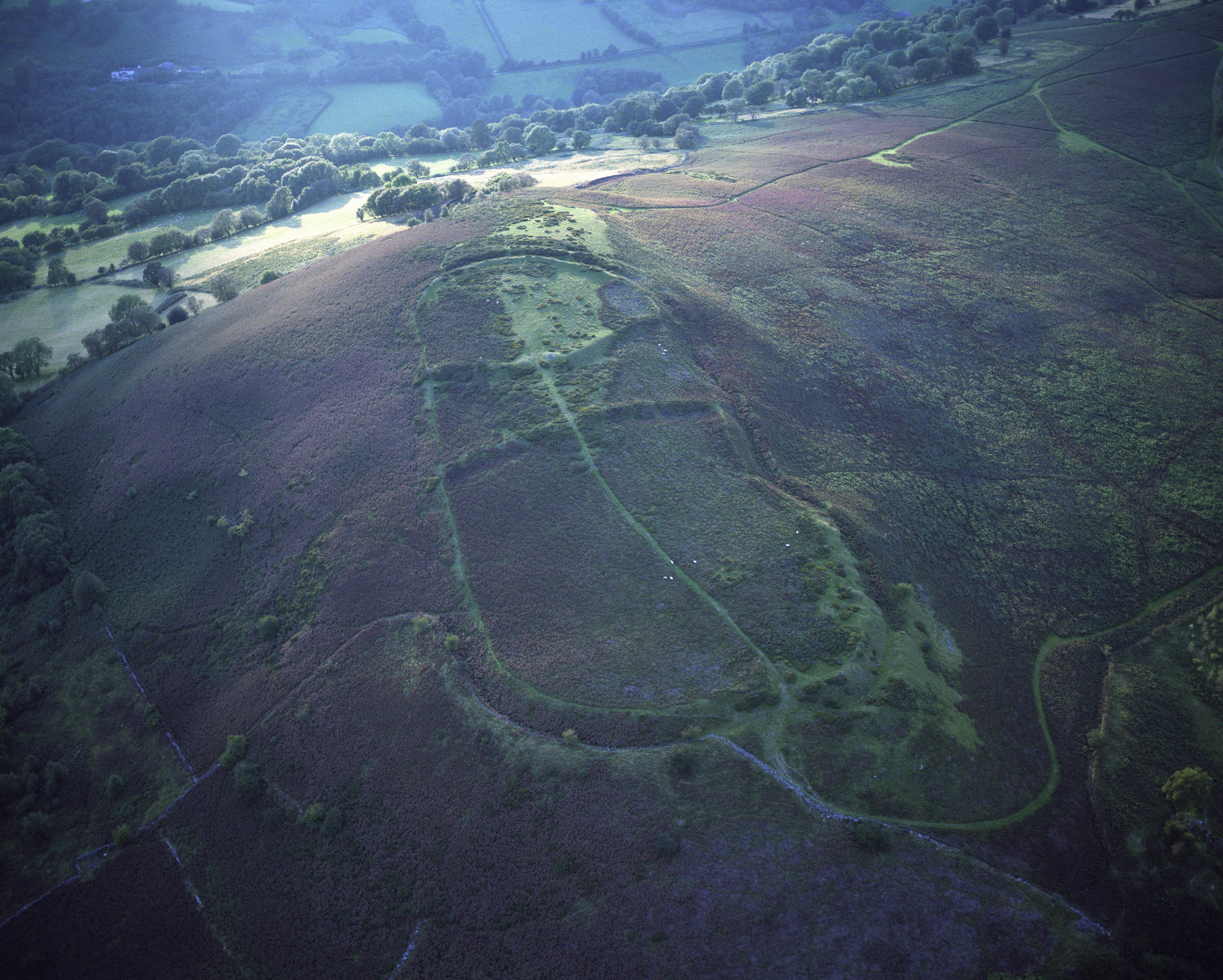
Gaer

Gaer is the name of a hill in the Black Mountains of the Brecon Beacons National Park in Monmouthshire, south Wales. It lies at the southern end of the long ridge between the valley of the Grwyne Fawr and the Vale of Ewyas, one mile north of Bryn Arw and three miles northeast of Sugarloaf. Its summit, at 427m above sea level, sits within an Iron Age hillfort known as Twyn y Gaer.

== Geology ==
The mass of the hill is formed from the mudstones and sandstones of the Senni Beds formation whilst the upper slopes are composed of the sandstones of the overlying Brownstones Formation. Both are assigned to the Old Red Sandstone, which was laid down during the Devonian period. The southern slopes around Coed y Cerrig have experienced substantial landslipping in the past.

== Access ==
The upper part of the hill is designated as open country, making it freely accessible to walkers. Several public footpaths and unmetalled roads (often referred to as 'green lanes') weave around the lower slopes, enhancing the hill's accessibility.

== See also ==
- List of hillforts in Wales
