= Constantine =

Constantine most often refers to:

- Constantine the Great, Roman emperor from 306 to 337, also known as Constantine I
- Constantine, Algeria, a city in Algeria

Constantine may also refer to:

== People ==
=== Name ===
- Constantine (name), a masculine given name and surname

=== Roman/Byzantine emperors ===
==== Enumerated ====
- Constantine II (emperor)
- Constantine III (Western Roman emperor)
- Constantine III (Byzantine emperor)
- Constantine IV
- Constantine V
- Constantine VI
- Constantine VII Porphyrogenitus
- Constantine VIII
- Constantine IX Monomachos
- Constantine X Doukas
- Constantine XI Palaiologos

==== Not enumerated ====
- Tiberius II, reigned officially as "Constantine"
- Constans II, reigned officially as "Constantine"
- Constantine (son of Leo V)
- Constantine (son of Theophilos)
- Constantine (son of Basil I)
- Constantine Lekapenos
- Constantine Doukas (co-emperor)
- Constantine Laskaris (?)

=== Other rulers ===
- Constantine I, Prince of Armenia
- Constantine II, Prince of Armenia
- Constantine I, King of Armenia, also called Constantine III
- Constantine II, King of Armenia, also called Constantine IV
- Constantine III, King of Armenia, also called Constantine V
- Constantine IV, King of Armenia, also called Constantine VI
- Constantine of Baberon, regent of Zabel, and father of Hetoum I of Armenia, 13th century
- Constantine I (or Kuestantinos I) of Ethiopia, also known as Zara Yaqob
- Constantine II (or Kuestantinos II) of Ethiopia, also known as Eskender
- Constantine I of Greece
- Constantine II of Greece
- Constantine I of Arborea
- Constantín mac Fergusa, or Constantin of the Picts
- Constantín mac Cináeda, or Constantine I of Scotland
- Constantine II of Scotland
- Constantine III of Scotland
- Constantine I of Cagliari
- Constantine II of Cagliari
- Constantine III of Gallura
- Constantine I of Torres
- Constantine Tikh of Bulgaria
- Grand Duke Constantine Pavlovich of Russia
- Constantine Dragaš
- Constantine I of Georgia
- Constantine II of Georgia
- Constantine I of Imereti
- Constantine II of Imereti
- Constantine I of Kakheti
- Constantine II of Kakheti
- Constantine Mavrocordatos
- Constantine Ypsilantis
- Constantine (Briton), king in sub-Roman Britain
- Constantine of Strathclyde, supposed king of Strathclyde

=== Religious leaders ===
- Constantine I of Constantinople
- Constantine II of Constantinople
- Constantine III of Constantinople
- Constantine IV of Constantinople
- Constantine V of Constantinople
- Constantine VI of Constantinople
- Pope Constantine
- Antipope Constantine II

=== Other people ===
- Constantine (British saint), several obscure saints
- Constantine of Preslav, a medieval Bulgarian scholar
- Constantine or Causantín, Earl of Fife (fl. 1095–1128), a Scottish nobleman
- Constantine Stilbes (fl. 1070–1220), a Byzantine clergyman and poet
- Constantine the African (c. 1020–1087), a Tunisian doctor
- Constantine the Jew (d. c. 886), Byzantine monk
- Constantine-Silvanus (also called Silvanus), founder of the Paulicians
- Saint Cyril the Philosopher, whose original name was Constantine

== Fiction ==
- John Constantine, a fictional character appearing in the DC Comics franchise, including Hellblazer
  - Constantine (comic book), a series replacing the earlier Hellblazer
  - Constantine (film), a 2005 American film based on the DC Comic book character from the Hellblazer series
  - Constantine (video game), an action-adventure video game based on the film
  - Constantine (TV series), a 2014 NBC TV series, based on the comic book Hellblazer
  - Constantine: City of Demons, a 2018 CW Seed animated web series
- Constantine, the main antagonist of the film Muppets Most Wanted

== Places ==
=== Algeria ===
- Constantine, Algeria, the nation's third largest city and capital of Constantine Province
- Constantine Province, surrounding the city of the same name
- Beylik of Constantine, an administrative unit of the Regency of Algiers
- Constantine (departement), similar area during French Algeria

=== Serbia ===
- Constantine the Great Airport, Niš, Serbia

=== Switzerland ===
- Constantine, Switzerland, a municipality in the canton of Vaud

=== United Kingdom ===
- Constantine Bay, near Padstow, Cornwall
- Constantine, Cornwall, near Falmouth
- Constantine College, York, a college of the University of York

=== United States ===
- Constantine, Michigan, a village in St. Joseph county

== Other uses ==
- Order of Constantine
- Constantine (album), 2007, by Constantine Maroulis
- Constantine, a 2020 album by 40 Glocc
- Constantine, a frog character who resembles Kermit the Frog and is the foremost criminal in the 2014 film Muppets Most Wanted

== See also ==
- Constantin (disambiguation)
- Constantines, indie rock band
- Constantius (disambiguation)
