= Mediolanum (Whitchurch) =

Roman town in Shropshire, England

Coordinates: 52.967°N 2.681°W

Mediolanum was a fort and small town in the Roman province of Britannia. Today it is known as Whitchurch, located in the English county of Shropshire.

== Town ==
The town was located on a major Roman routeway between Deva Victrix (Chester) and Viroconium Cornoviorum (Wroxeter). The Romans first built a fort, which has been tentatively suggested as forming part of the border defences established by Ostorius Scapula around AD 52. By about AD 100, however, the army had probably moved on and the surrounding civilian vicus would have taken over the site. In the mid-2nd century, the area was at least partly covered by timber-framed industrial buildings. The town reached the height of its prosperity by the early 3rd century and there was much rebuilding in stone. This continued for the next hundred years. Masonry houses with associated wooden outhouses were most common during this period. Roman artefacts from the site are on display in the Whitchurch Heritage Centre.

It is believed the present day Pepper Street had Roman origins. This common name seen in several former Roman settlements is a derivation of the Roman Via Piperatica, the street on which pepper and spices were sold.

== Archaeological finds ==
In 2016, archaeologists discovered the remains of a Roman wooden trackway, a number of structural timbers, a large amount of Roman pottery and fifteen leather shoes during work on a culvert in Whitchurch.

In 2018, a collection of 37 small Roman coins was unearthed at Hollyhurst near Whitchurch. The small denomination, brass or copper alloy coins, known as Dupondii and Asses, were from the reign of the Emperor Trajan, AD 98–117. Some dated back to between AD 69–79 from the time of Emperor Vespasian.

== See also ==
- Other Mediolana of the Roman Empire
